= List of Sony Cyber-shot cameras =

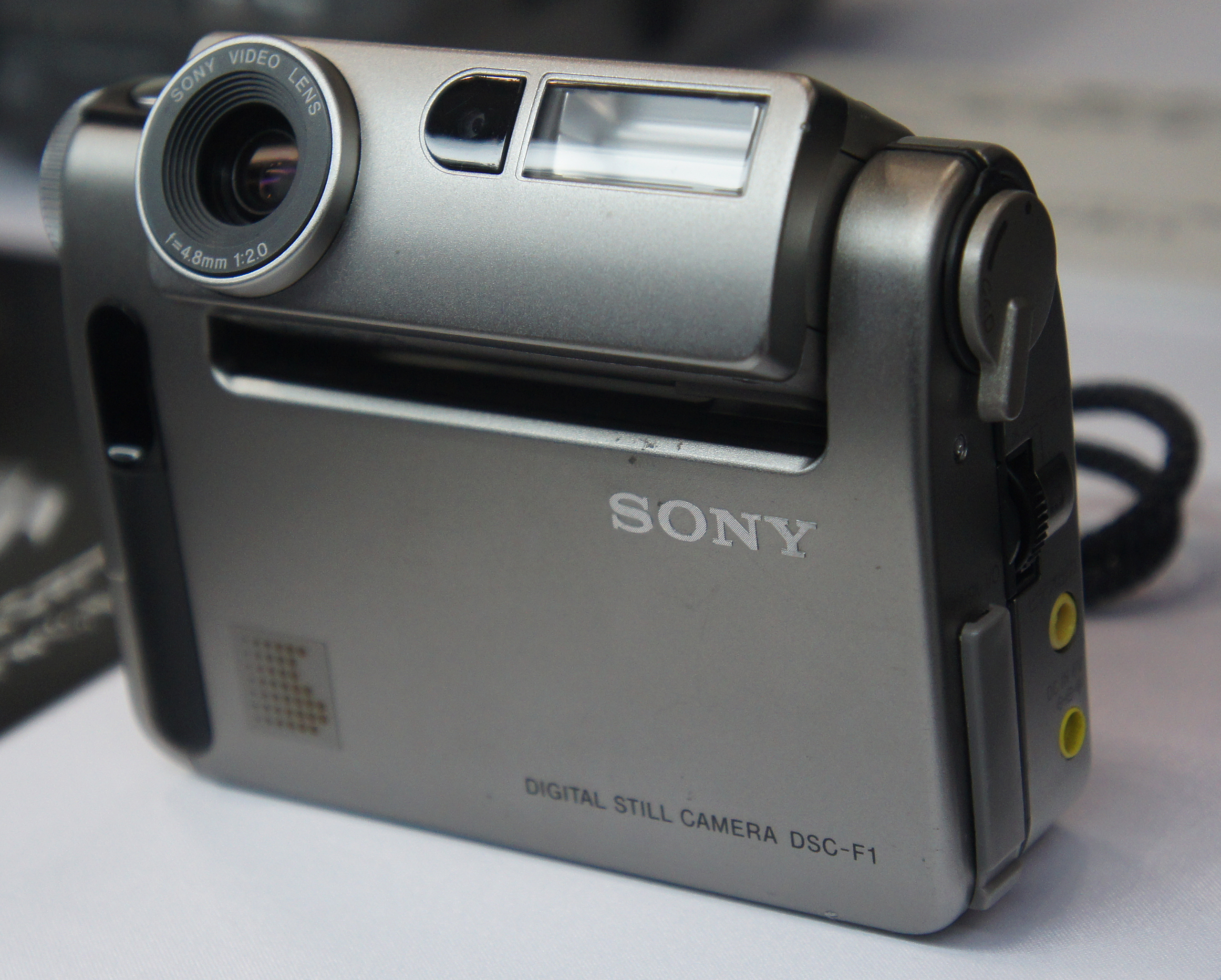
Sony DSC-F1, the first camera of the series, released in 1996.

The following is a list of Sony digital cameras made under the Cyber-shot brand name.

Notes:

- DSC is an abbreviation for Digital Still Camera
- Models with a "V"-suffix include built-in GPS functionality

== D series ==
High-end series
Product	Production	Sensor specifications	Lens	Size WxHxD (mm)	LCD Screen
DSC-D700	Since 1998	1.5 MP 1344×1024; 1/2" CCD	28-140mm f/2-2.4	130×100×150	2.5" 180,000
DSC-D770	June 1999	1.5 MP 1344×1024; 1/2" CCD	28-140mm f/2-2.4	130×100×150	2.5" 180,000

== F series ==
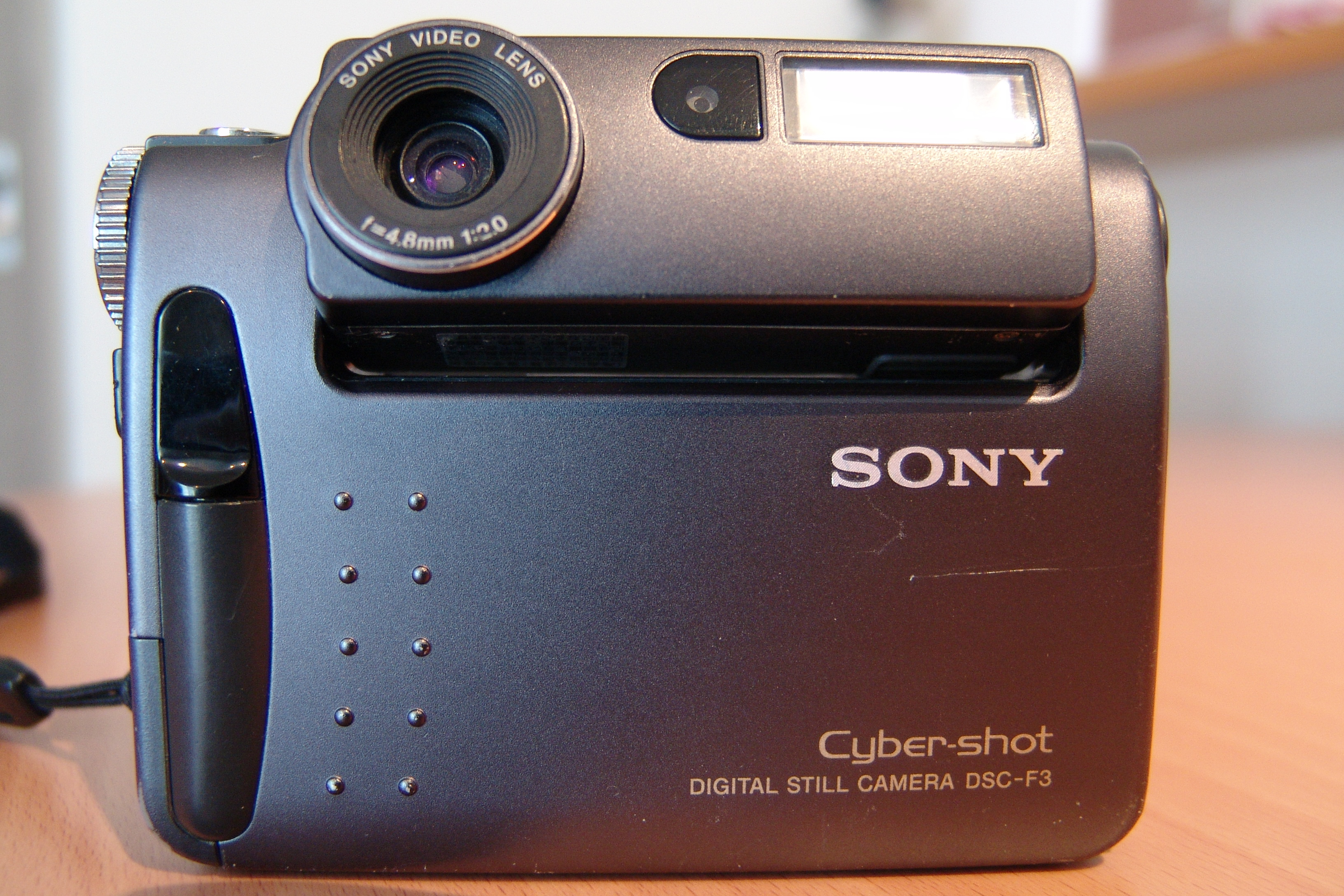
Sony Cyber-shot DSC-F3 (1997)

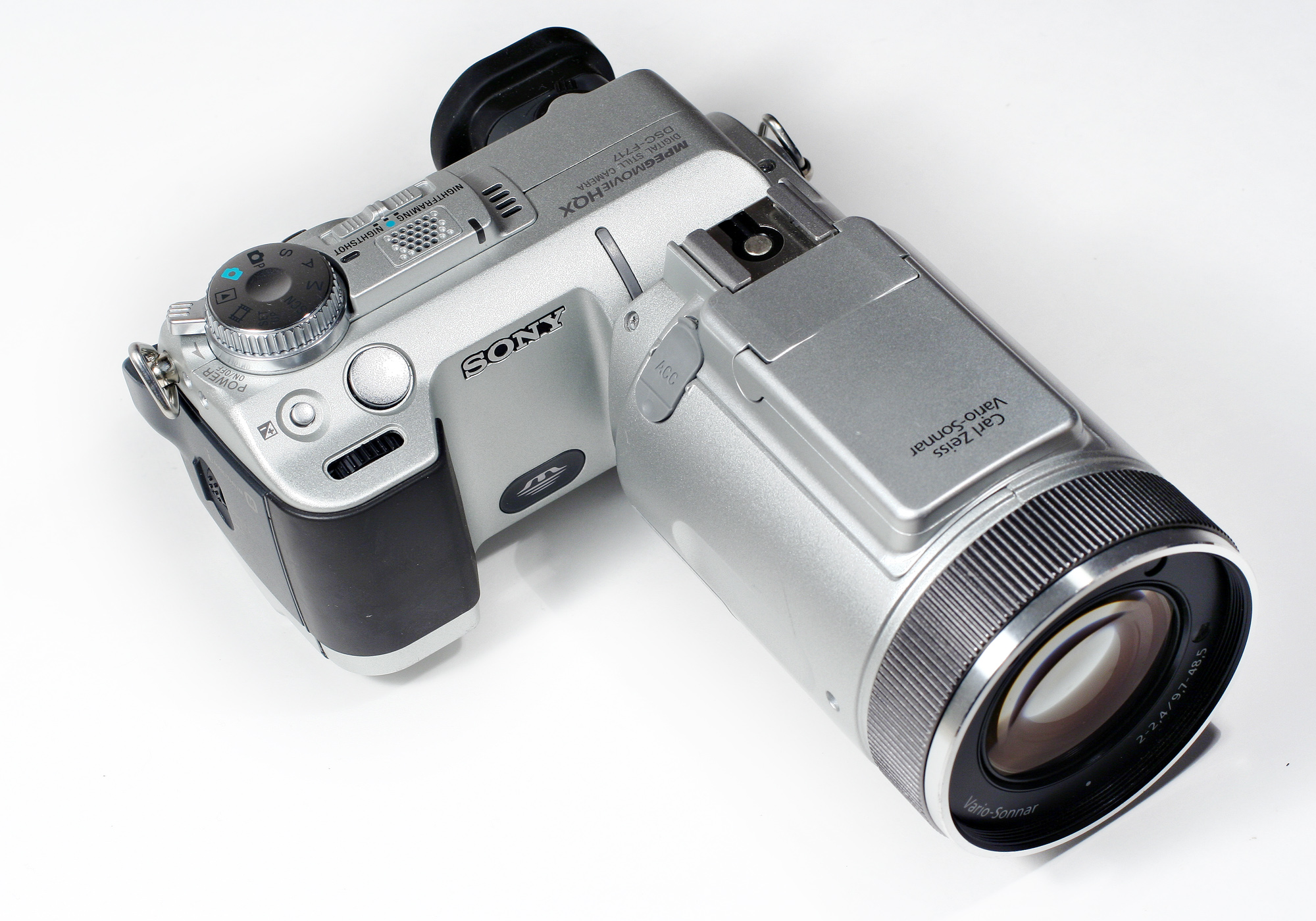
Sony Cyber-shot DSC-F717 (2002)

High-end series with swivelling lens and digital viewfinder
Product	Production	Sensor specifications	Lens	Size WxHxD (mm)	LCD Screen	Video specifications	Infrared night vision
DSC-F1	Since 1996	0.3 MP 640×480 1/3" CCD	35mm f/2	108×78×45	1.8" 61,380	n/a	No
DSC-F3	Since 1997	0.3 MP 640×480; 1/4" CCD	46mm f/2	102×78×41	1.8" 61,380	5s	No
DSC-F505	August 1999	2.1 MP 1600×1200; 1/2" CCD	38-190mm f/2.8-3.3	107×62×136	2" 123,000	320×240 8.333fps 15s 160×112 8.333fps 60s	No
DSC-F505V	April 2000	2.6 MP 1856×1392; 1/1.8" CCD	38-190mm f/2.8-3.3	107×62×136	2" 123,000	320×240 8.333fps 15s 160×112 8.333fps 60s	No
DSC-F55	Feb 1999	2.1 MP 1600×1200; 1/2" CCD	37mm f/2.8	103×79×48	2" 123,000	320×240 8.333fps 15s 160×112 8.333fps 60s	No
DSC-F55V	April 2000	2.6 MP 1856×1392; 1/1.8" CCD	37mm f/2.8	103×79×48	2" 123,000	320×240 8.333fps 15s 160×112 8.333fps 60s	No
DSC-F707	August 2001	5 MP 2560×1920; 2/3" CCD	38-190mm f/2.0-2.4	120×67×148	1.8" 123,000	320×240 16.666fps 15s 320×240 8.333fps unlimited	Yes
DSC-F717	September 2002	5 MP 2560×1920; 2/3" CCD	38-190mm f/2.0-2.4	120×67×148	1.8" 123,000	320×240 16.666fps 320×240 8.333fps	Yes
DSC-F828	August 2003	8 MP 3264×2448; 2/3" CCD RGBE	28-200mm f/2.0-2.8	134×91×156	1.8" 134,000	640×480 30fps 640×480 16.666fps 160×112 8.333fps	Yes
DSC-F88	May 2004	5 MP 2592×1944; 1/2.4" CCD	38-114mm f/3.5-4.2	97.8×74.4×25.6	1.8" 134,000	640×480 16.666fps 160×112 8.333fps	No

== G series ==
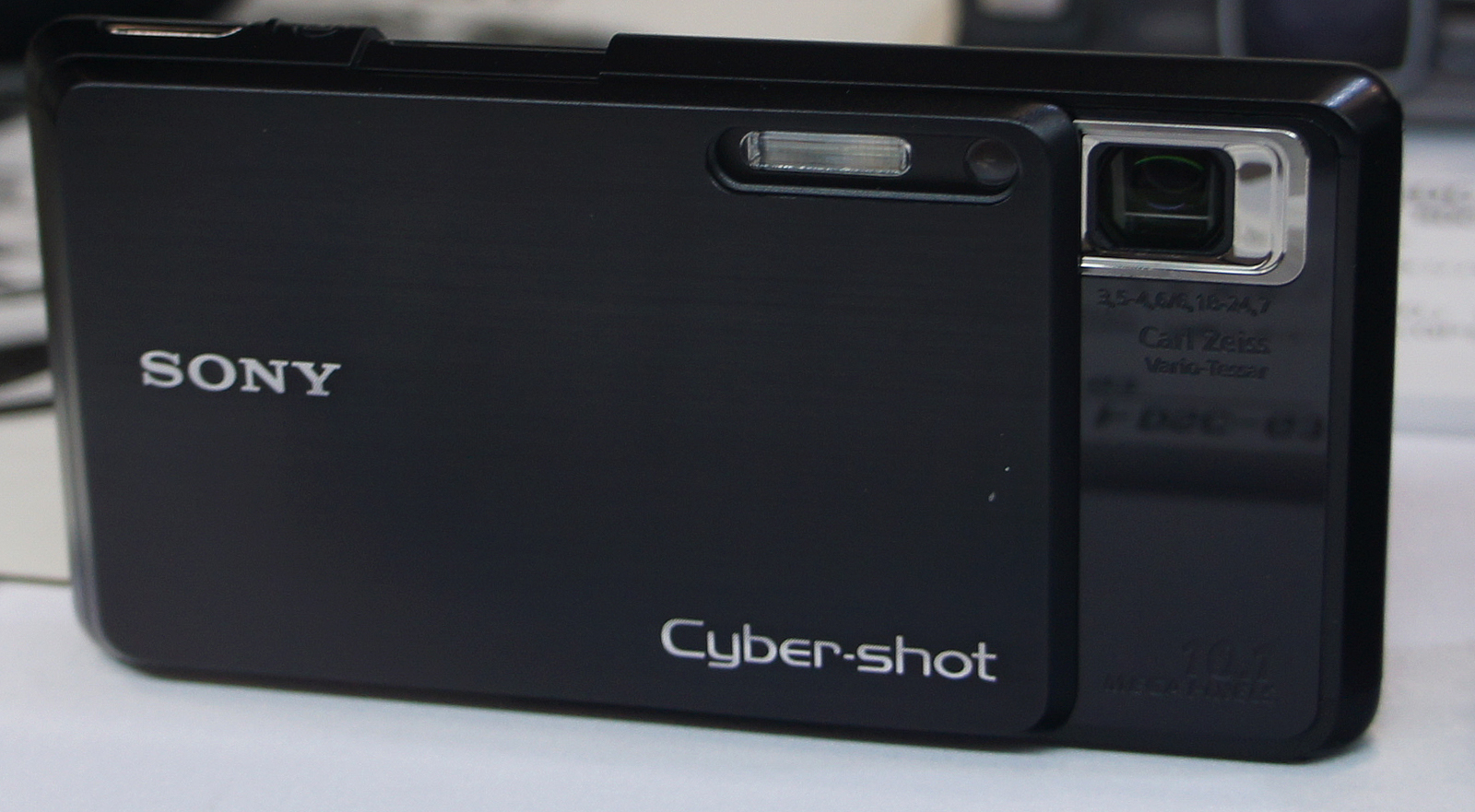
Sony Cyber-shot DSC-G3 (2009)

G series
Product	Production	Sensor specifications	Storage	Connectivity	Video	Lens	Screen
DSC-G1	April 2007	6 MP 2816×2112 1/2.5" CCD	2 GB internal storage	Integrated Wi-Fi and wireless photo sharing via DLNA	640×480 30fps	38-114mm f/3.5-4.3	3.5" 921,000
DSC-G3	January 2009	10 MP 3648×2736 1/2.3" CCD	4 GB internal storage	Integrated Wi-Fi and web browsing	640×480 30fps	35 -140mm f/3.5-4.6	3.5" 921,000

== H series ==
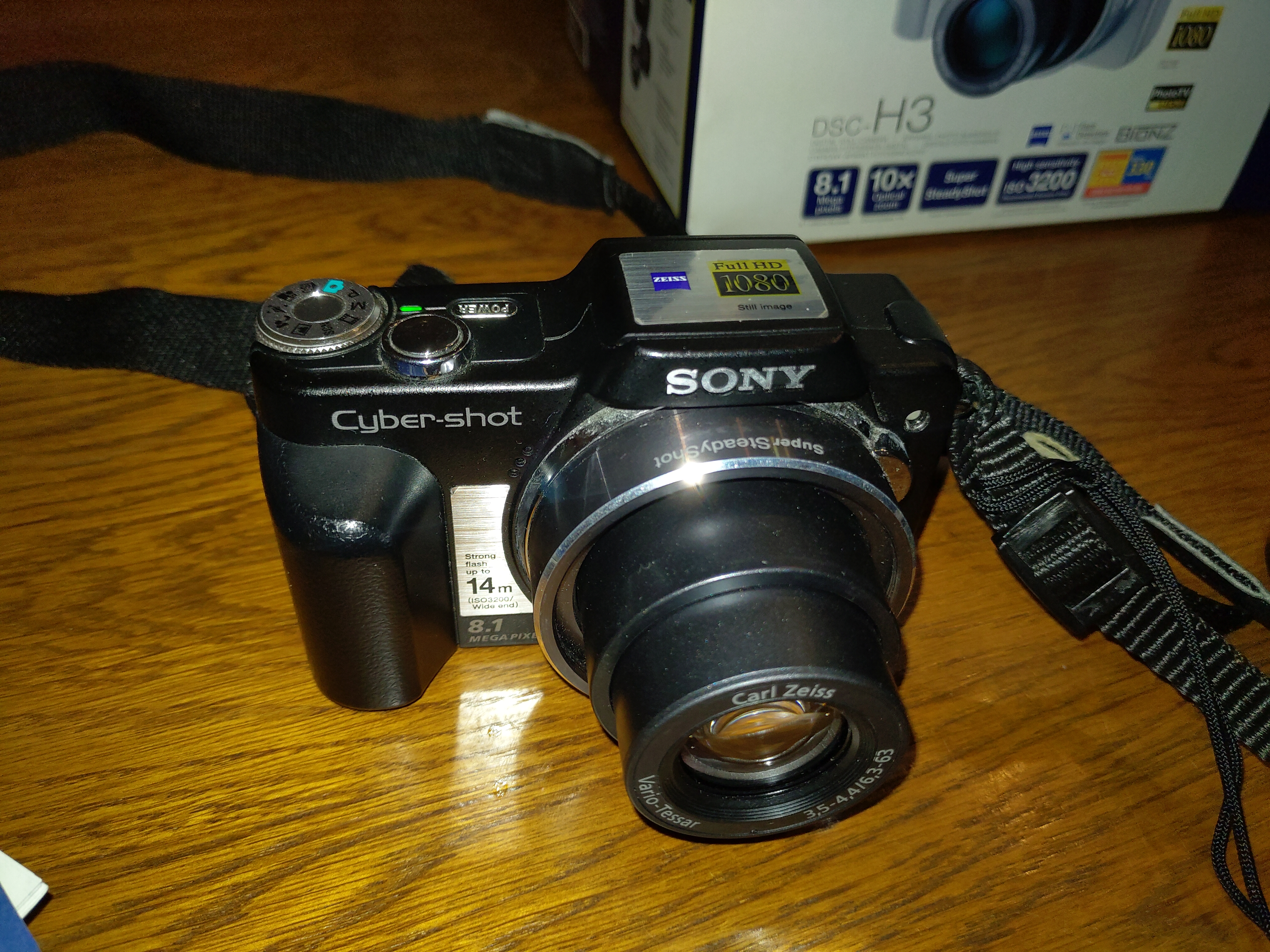
Sony Cyber-shot DSC-H3 used a compact format

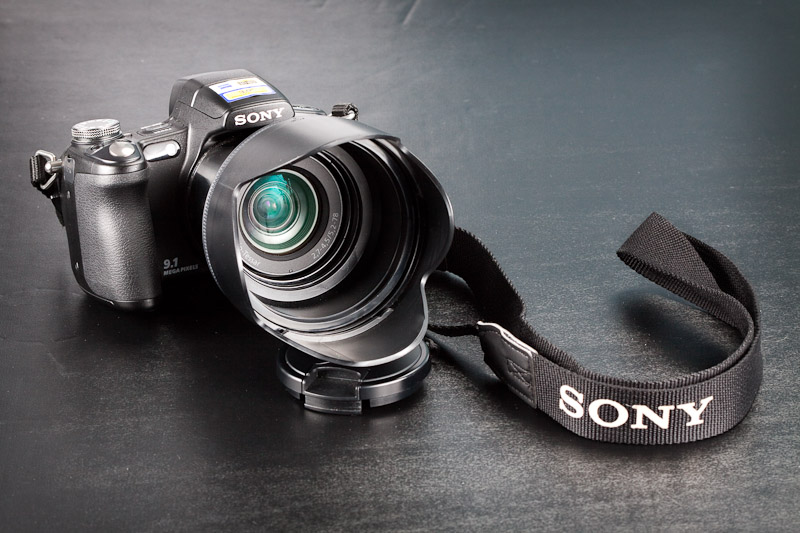
Sony Cyber-shot DSC-H50 bridge camera with lens hood attached.

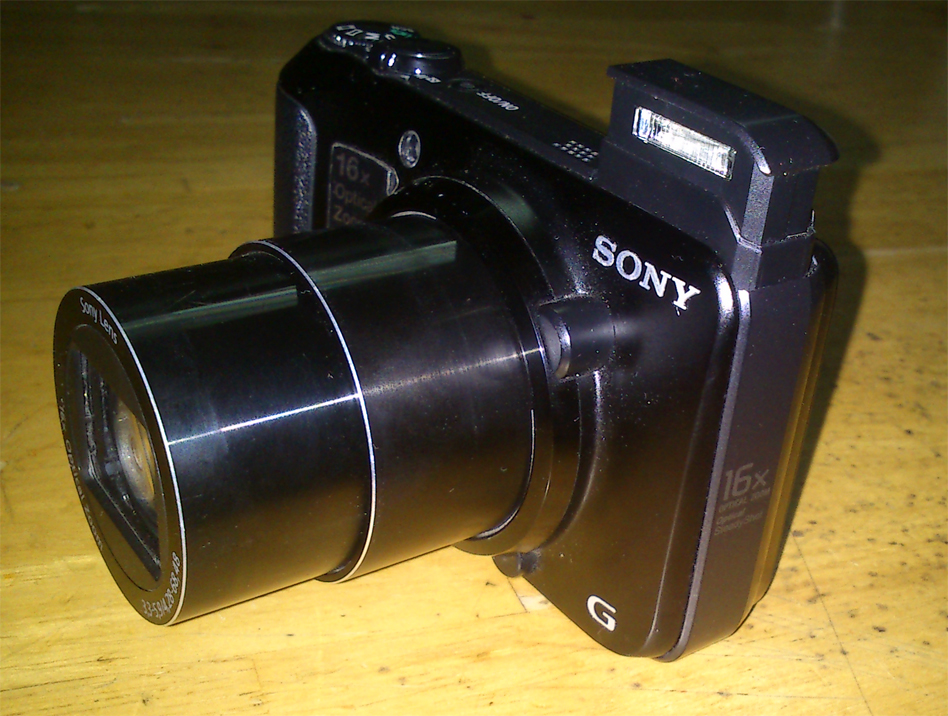
Sony Cyber-shot DSC-H90

All cameras used CCD sensors and had optical image stabilization. The series included bridge cameras and compact cameras.

Product	Production	Screen	Resolution	Zoom	Lens	Video	Size (WxHxD) mm	FPS
DSC-H1 (bridge)	February 2005	2.5" LCD 115,200	5.1 MP 1/2.5" CCD	12×	36-432mm f/2.8-3.7	640×480 30fps	108×82×91	1.3fps (9 frames)
DSC-H2 (bridge)	February 2006	2" LCD 85,000	6 MP 1/2.5" CCD	12×	36-432mm f/2.8-3.7	640×480 30fps with optical zoom	107.8×81.4×91.2	1.3fps (7 frames)
DSC-H3(compact)	August 2007	HDTV output 2.5" LCD 115,000	8.1 MP 1/2.5" CCD	10×	38-380mm f/3.5-4.4	640×480 30fps with optical zoom	106×68.5×47.5	2fps
DSC-H5 (bridge)	February 2006	3" LCD 230,000	7.2 MP 1/2.5" CCD	12×	36-432mm f/2.8-3.7	640×480 30fps with optical zoom	113.2×83×94	1.1fps (7.2 MP 7 shots) 1.4fps (640×480 100 shots)
DSC-H7 (bridge)	February 2007	2.5" LCD 115,000	8.1 MP 1/2.5" CCD	15×	31-465mm f/2.7-4.5	640×480 30fps with optical zoom	109.5×83.4×85.7	2.2fps (100 shots)
DSC-H9 (bridge)	February 2007	3.0" tilting LCD 230,000	8.1 MP 1/2.5" CCD	15×	31-465mm f/2.7-4.5	640×480 30fps with optical zoom	113.2×83×94	2.2fps (100 shots)
DSC-H10(compact)	January 2008	3.0" LCD 230,000	8.1 MP 1/2.5" CCD	10×	38-380mm f/3.5-4.4	640×480 30fps with optical zoom	106×68.5×47.5	2fps
DSC-H20 (compact)	February 2009	3.0" LCD 230,000	10.1 MP 1/2.5" CCD	10×	38-380mm f/3.5-4.4	720p 30fps with optical zoom	107×69×47	1.8fps (100 shots)
DSC-H50 (bridge)	February 2008	3.0" tilting LCD 230,000	9.1 MP 1/2.3" CCD	15×	31-465mm f/2.7-4.5	640×480 30fps with optical zoom	116.1×81.4×86.0	1.6fps (100 shots)
DSC-H55 (compact)	February 2010	3" LCD 230,000	14.1 MP 1/2.3" CCD	10×	25-250mm f/3.5-5.5	720p 30fps with optical zoom	103×58×29	1.84fps (4 shots)
DSC-H70 (compact)	January 2011	3" LCD 230,000	16.2 MP 1/2.3" CCD	10×	25-250mm f/3.5-5.5	720p 30fps with optical zoom	102×58×29	1fps (3 shots)
DSC-H90 (compact)	February 2012	3" LCD 461,000	16.2 MP 1/2.3" CCD	16×	24-384mm f/3.3-5.9	720p 30fps with optical zoom	105×60×34	1fps
DSC-H200(compact)	January 2013	3" LCD 461,000	20 MP 1/2.3" CCD	26.4×	24-633mm f/3.1-5.9	720p 30fps with optical zoom	123×83×87	0.80fps (100 shots)
DSC-H300 (compact)	February 2014	3" LCD 461,000	20 MP 1/2.3" CCD	35×	25-875mm f/3.4-6.5	720p 30fps with optical zoom	130×95×122	0.80fps (100 shots)
DSC-H400 (bridge)	February 2014	3" LCD 461,000	20 MP 1/2.3" CCD	63×	24.5-1550mm f/3.4-6.5	720p 30fps with optical zoom	130×93×103	0.71fps (100 shots)

== HX series ==
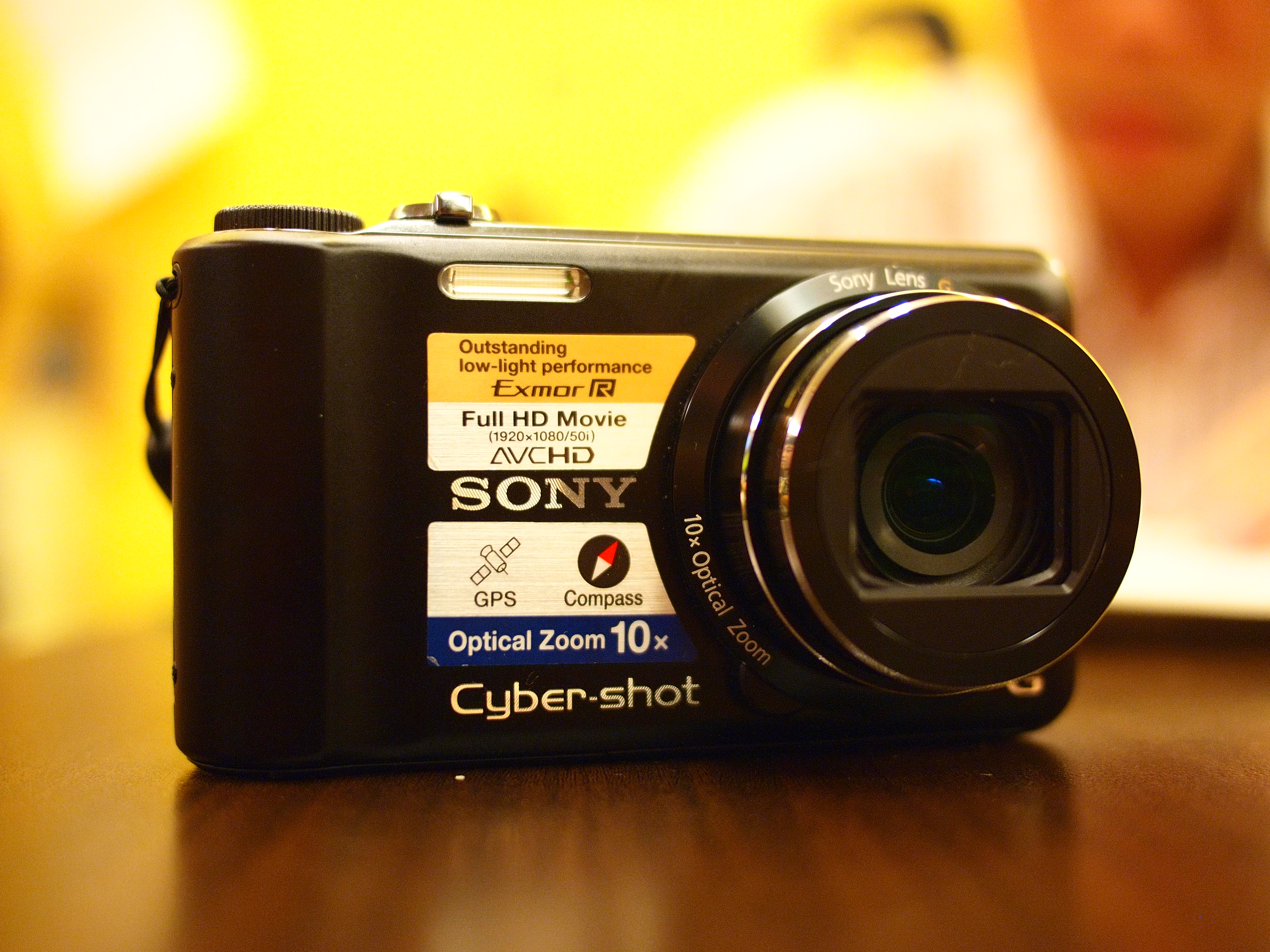
Sony Cyber-shot DSC-HX5V (2010)

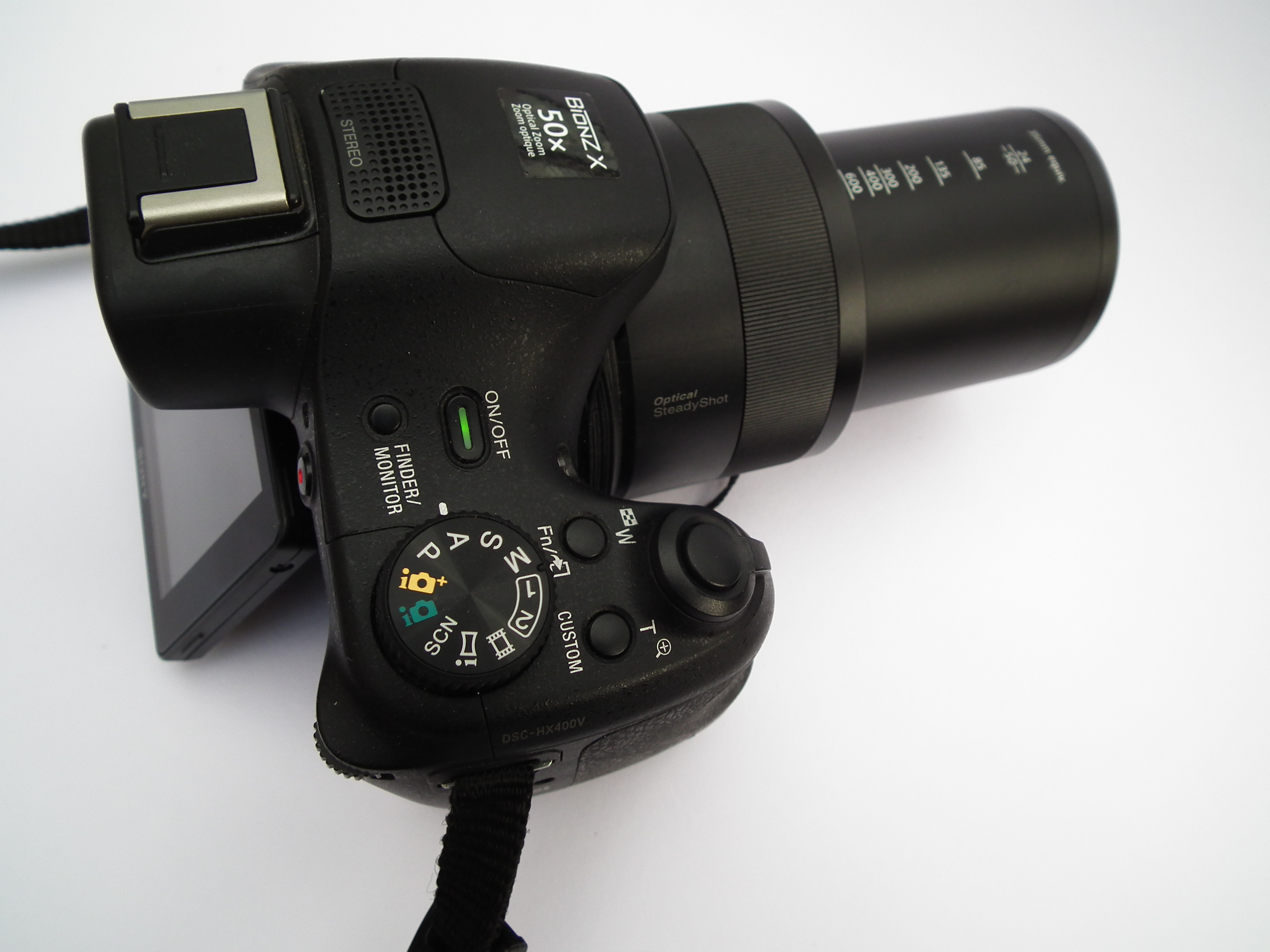
Sony Cyber-shot DSC-HX400V (2014) with 50X zoom and GPS

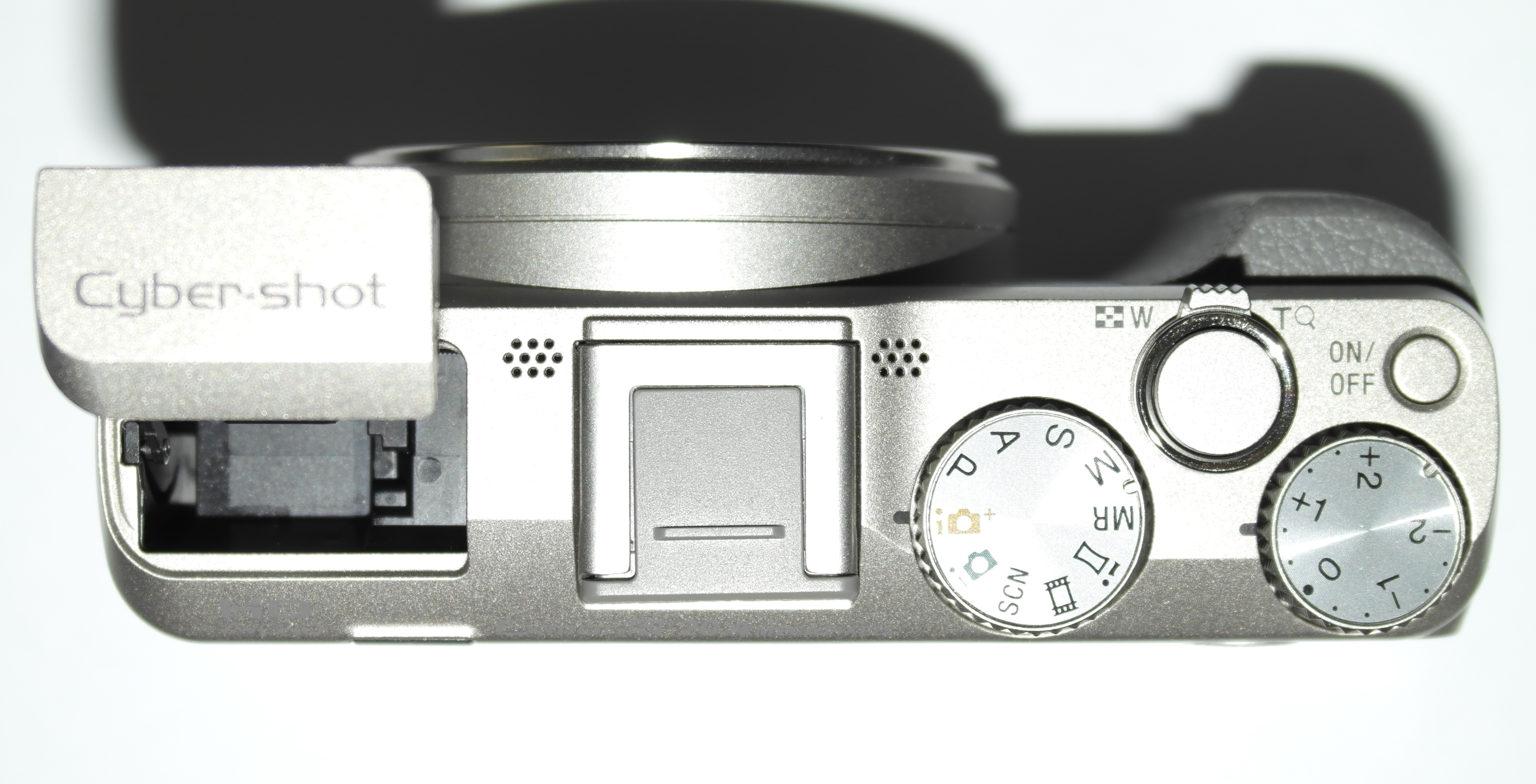
Sony Cyber-shot HyperXoom 50

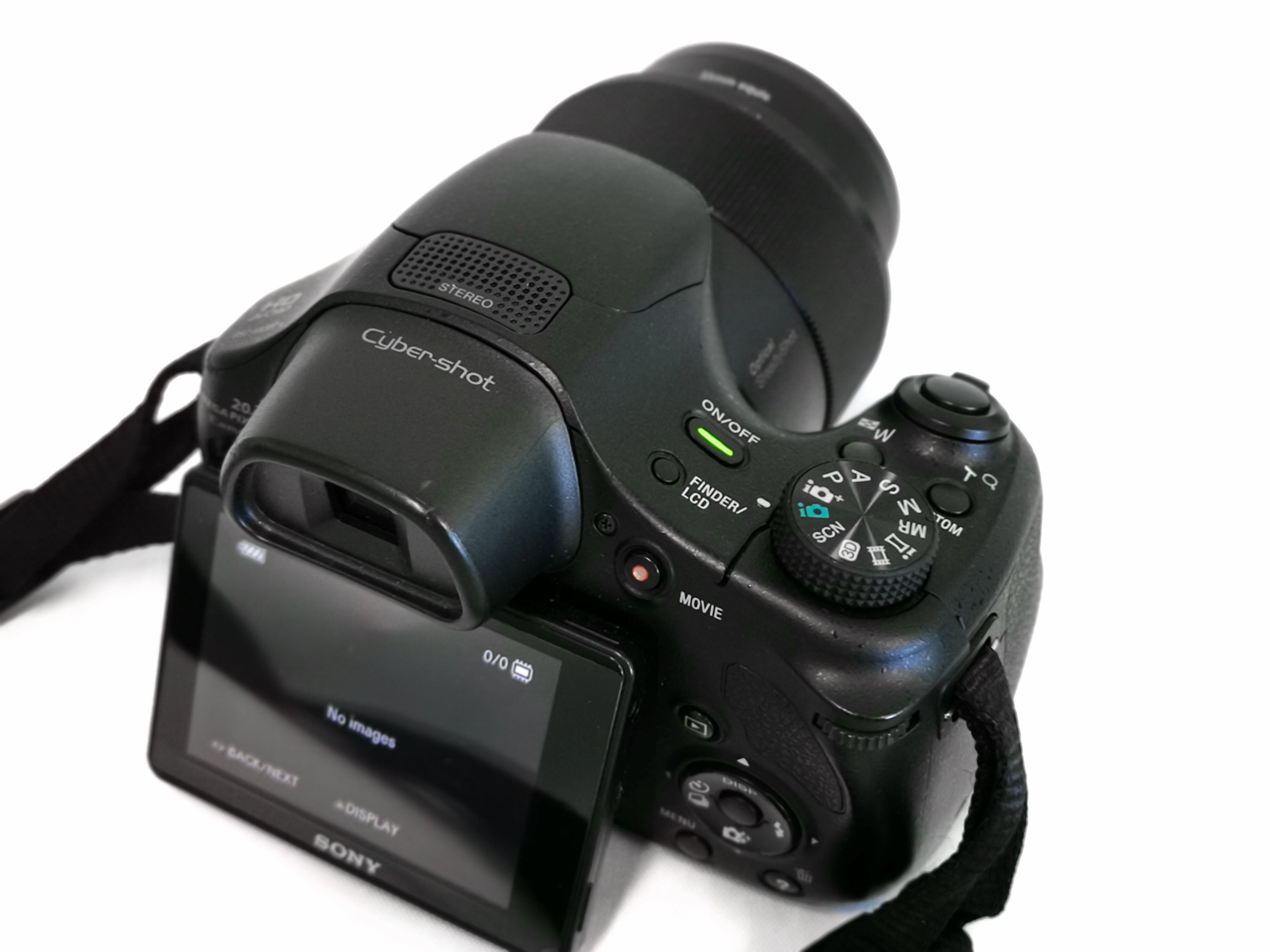
Sony Cyber-shot DSC-HX300

Note: HX is an abbreviation for HyperXoom

All cameras used CMOS sensors, could zoom optically while filming, and had optical image stabilization. The series included bridge cameras and Compact cameras with Superzoom.

Product	Production	Resolution	Zoom	Screen	Lens	Video	Connectivity	FPS	Accessories
DSC-HX1	March 2009	9.1 MP 1/2.4" CMOS	20×	3" tilting LCD 230,000	28-560mm f/2.8-5.2	1080p 30fps		10fps (10 shots)	Built-in EVF
DSC-HX5/V	January 2010	10.2 MP 1/2.4" BSI-CMOS	10×	3" LCD 230,000	25-250mm f/3.5-5.5	1080i 60/50	GPS	10fps (10 shots)	
DSC-HX7V	January 2011	16.2 MP 1/2.3" BSI-CMOS	10×	3" LCD 921,600	25-250mm f/3.5-5.5	1080i 60/50	GPS	10fps (10 shots)	
DSC-HX9V	February 2011	16.2 MP 1/2.3" BSI-CMOS	16×	3" LCD 921,600	24-384mm f/3.3-5.9	1080i 60/50	GPS	10fps (10 shots)	
DSC-HX10V	February 2012	18.2 MP 1/2.3" BSI-CMOS	16×	3" LCD 921,600	24-384mm f/3.3-5.9	1080i 60/50	GPS	10fps (10 shots)	
DSC-HX20V	July 2012	18.2 MP 1/2.3" BSI-CMOS	20×	3" LCD 921,600	25-500mm f/3.2-5.8	1080p 60fps / 50fps	GPS	10fps (10 shots)	
DSC-HX30V	February 2012	18.2 MP 1/2.3" BSI-CMOS	20×	3" LCD 921,600	25-500mm f/3.2-5.8	1080p 60fps / 50fps	Wi-Fi and GPS	10fps (10 shots)	
DSC-HX50V	April 2013	20 MP 1/2.3" BSI-CMOS	30×	3" LCD 921,600	24-720mm f/3.5-6.3	1080p 60fps / 50fps	Wi-Fi and GPS	10fps (10 shots)	Versatile hot shoe for optional accessories (EVF, flash, external mic)
DSC-HX60/V	Since 2014	20 MP 1/2.3" BSI-CMOS	30×	3" LCD 921,600	26-780mm f/3.5-6.3	1080p 60fps / 50fps	Wi-Fi and NFC, V variant has GPS	10fps (10 shots)	Versatile hot shoe for optional accessories (EVF, flash, external mic)
DSC-HX80	March 2016	18.2 MP 1/2.3" BSI-CMOS	30×	3" tilting LCD 921,600	24-720mm f/3.5-6.4	1080p 60fps / 50fps	Wi-Fi and NFC, V variant has GPS	10fps (10 shots)	Built in EVF
DSC-HX90/V	April 2015	18.2 MP 1/2.3" BSI-CMOS	30×	3" tilting LCD 921,600	24-720mm f/3.5-6.4	1080p 60fps / 50fps	Wi-Fi and NFC, V variant has GPS	10fps (10 shots)	Built in EVF
DSC-HX95	September 2018	18.2 MP 1/2.3" BSI-CMOS	30×	3" tilting LCD 921,600	24-720mm f/3.5-6.4	4K 30fps 1080p 120fps	NFC, Bluetooth, and Wi-Fi	10fps (10 shots)	Built in EVF
DSC-HX99	September 2018	18.2 MP 1/2.3" BSI-CMOS	30×	3" tilting touch LCD 921,600	24-720mm f/3.5-6.4	4K 30fps 1080p 120fps	NFC, Bluetooth, and Wi-Fi	10fps (10 shots)	Built in EVF
DSC-HX100V	October 2011	16.2 MP 1/2.3" BSI-CMOS	30×	3" tilting LCD 921,600	27-810mm f/2.8-5.6	1080p 60fps / 50fps	GPS	10fps (10 shots)	Built in EVF
DSC-HX200V	March 2012	18.2 MP 1/2.3" BSI-CMOS	30×	3" tilting LCD 921,600	27-810mm f/2.8-5.6	1080p 60fps / 50fps	GPS	10fps (10 shots)	Built in EVF
DSC-HX300/V	February 2013	20.4 MP 1/2.3" BSI-CMOS	50×	3" tilting LCD 921,600	24-1200mm f/2.8-6.3	1080p 60fps / 50fps		10fps (10 shots)	Built in EVF
DSC-HX350/V	Since 2016	20.4 MP 1/2.3" BSI-CMOS	50×	3" tilting LCD 921,600	24-1200mm f/2.8-6.3	1080p 60fps / 50fps		10fps (10 shots)	Built in EVF
DSC-HX400/V	February 2014	20.4 MP 1/2.3" BSI-CMOS	50×	3" tilting LCD 921,600	24-1200mm f/2.8-6.3	1080p 60fps / 50fps	Wi-Fi, GPS, and NFC	10fps (10 shots)	Built in EVF and hotshoe

== L series ==
The DSC-L1 camera is a zoom version of the ultra-compact Cyber-shot U series featured Real Imaging Processor and 14Bit DXP A/D Conversion.

- DSC-L1 (2004, 4.0 MP, 3× optical zoom)

Product	Production	Sensor specifications	LCD Screen	Lens	Video	Size WxHxD (mm)	Battery
DSC-L1	August 2004	4.3 MP 2304×1728 1/2.7" CCD	1.5" 78,000	32-96mm f/2.8-5.1	640×480 30fps max (MPEG1)	95×44.3×25.7	NP-FT1

== M series ==
Compact cameras with a unique vertical-grip design and an articulated screen

- DSC-M1 (2004, 5.0 MP, 3× optical zoom)
- DSC-M2 (2005, 5.0 MP, 3× optical zoom)

Product	Production	Sensor specifications	LCD Screen	Lens	Video	Size WxHxD (mm)	Battery
DSC-M1	September 2004	5 MP 2592×1944 1/2.4" CCD	2.5" 123,000 Articulated	38-114mm f/3.5-4.4	640×480 30fps	51×114×28	NP-FT1
DSC-M2	September 2005	5 MP 2592×1944 1/2.3" CCD	2.5" 123,000 Articulated	38-114mm f/3.5-4.4	640×480 30fps	51×123×32	NP-FR1

== MD series ==
Compact camera using MiniDiscs.

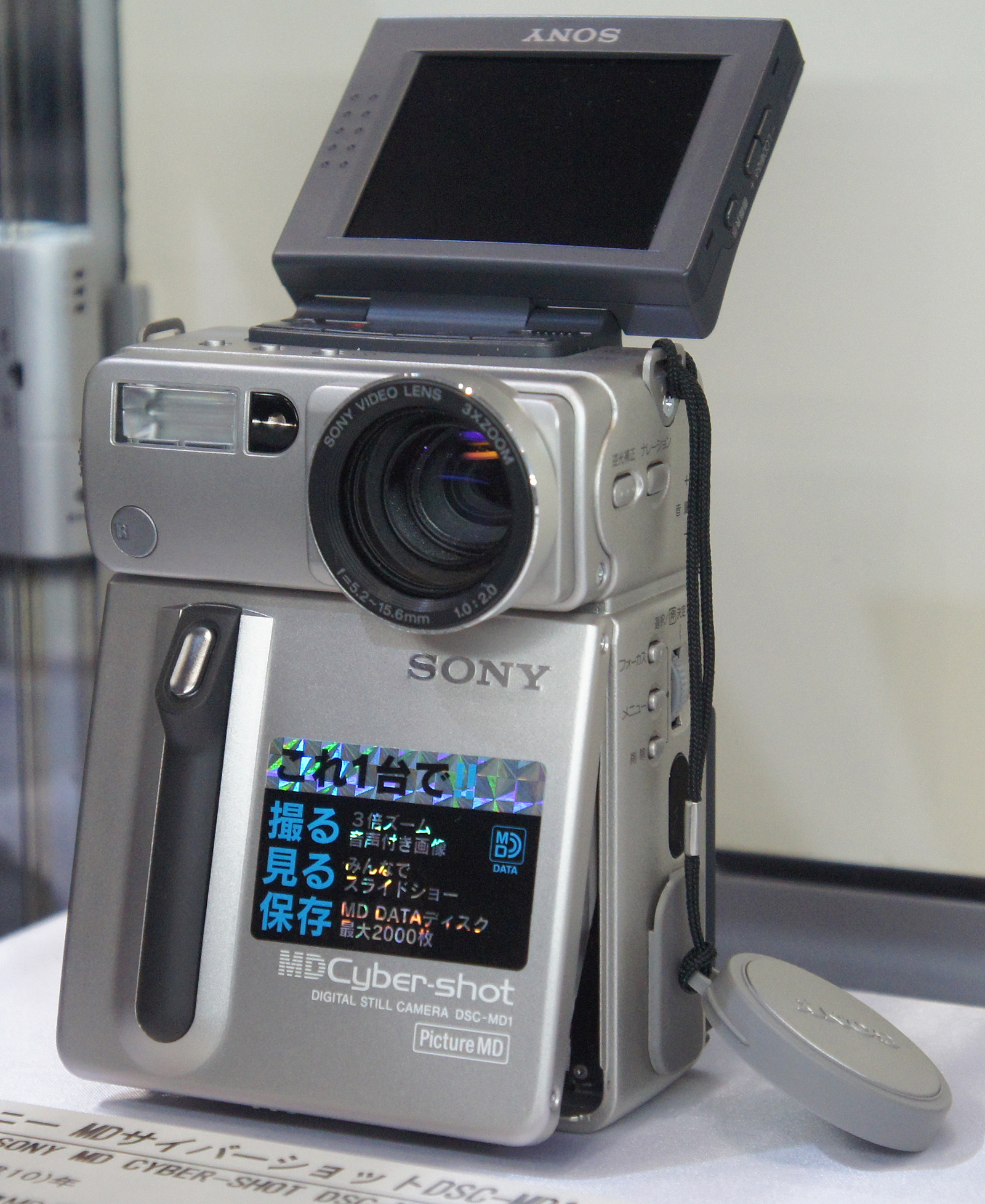
Sony CyberShot DSC-MD1

Product	Production	Sensor specifications	LCD Screen	Lens	Video	Size WxHxD (mm)	Battery
DSC-MD1		640×480; 1/3" CCD	2.5"	38-114mm f/3.5-4.4		87×116×56	NP-F100

== N series ==
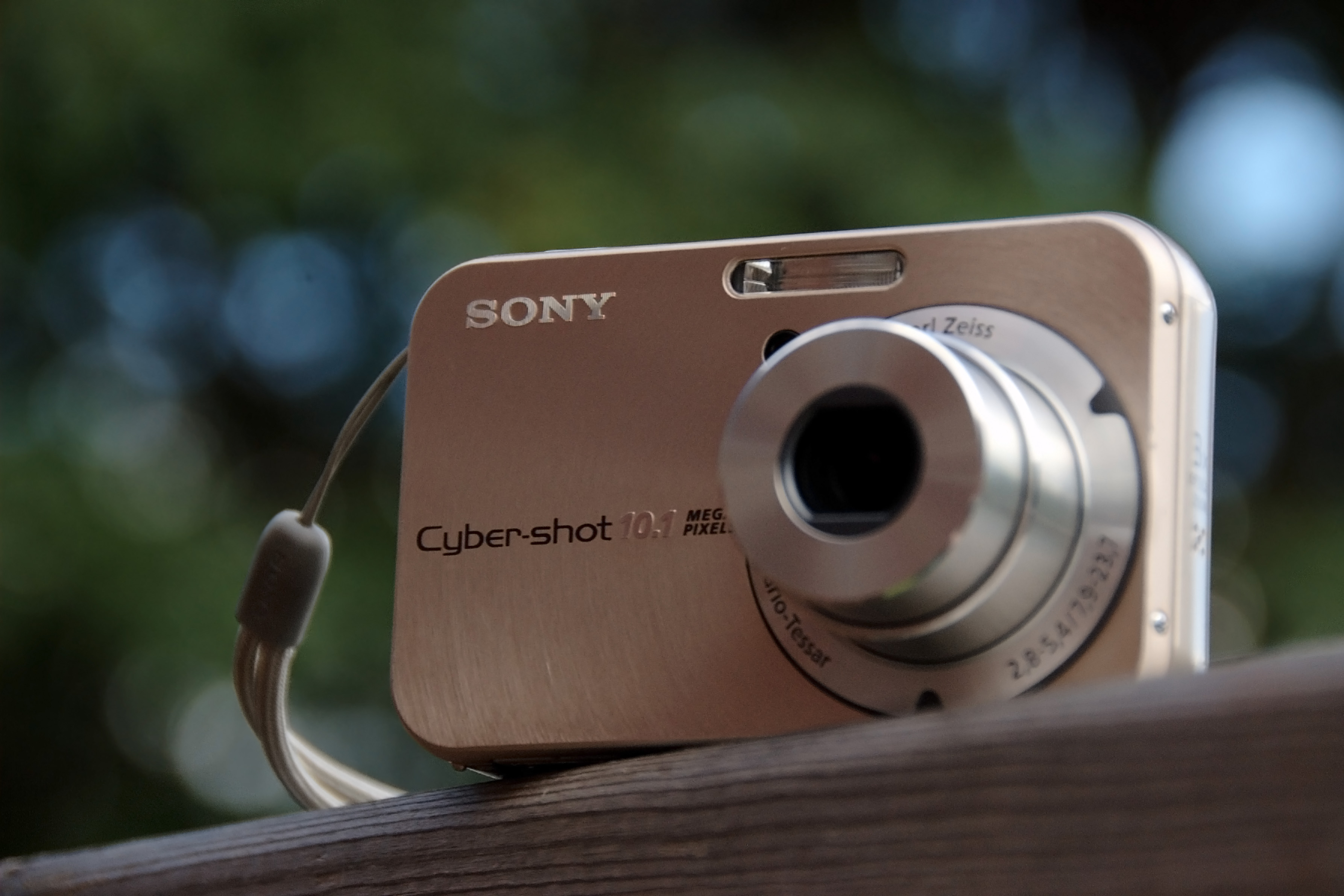
Sony Cyber-shot DSC-N2 (2006)

- DSC-N1 (2005, 3" LCD touch screen, 8.1 MP, 3× optical zoom)
- DSC-N2 (2006, 3" LCD touch screen, 10.1 MP, 3× optical zoom)

Product	Production	Sensor specifications	LCD Screen	Lens	Video	Size WxHxD (mm)	Battery
DSC-N1	October 2005	8 MP 3264×2448 1/1.8" CCD	3.0" 230,000	38-114mm f/2.8-5.4	640×480 30fps	94×60×20	NP-BG1
DSC-N2	September 2006	10 MP 3264×2448 1/1.7" CCD	3.0" 230,000	38-114mm f/2.8-5.4	640×480 30fps	94×60×20	NP-BG1

== P series ==
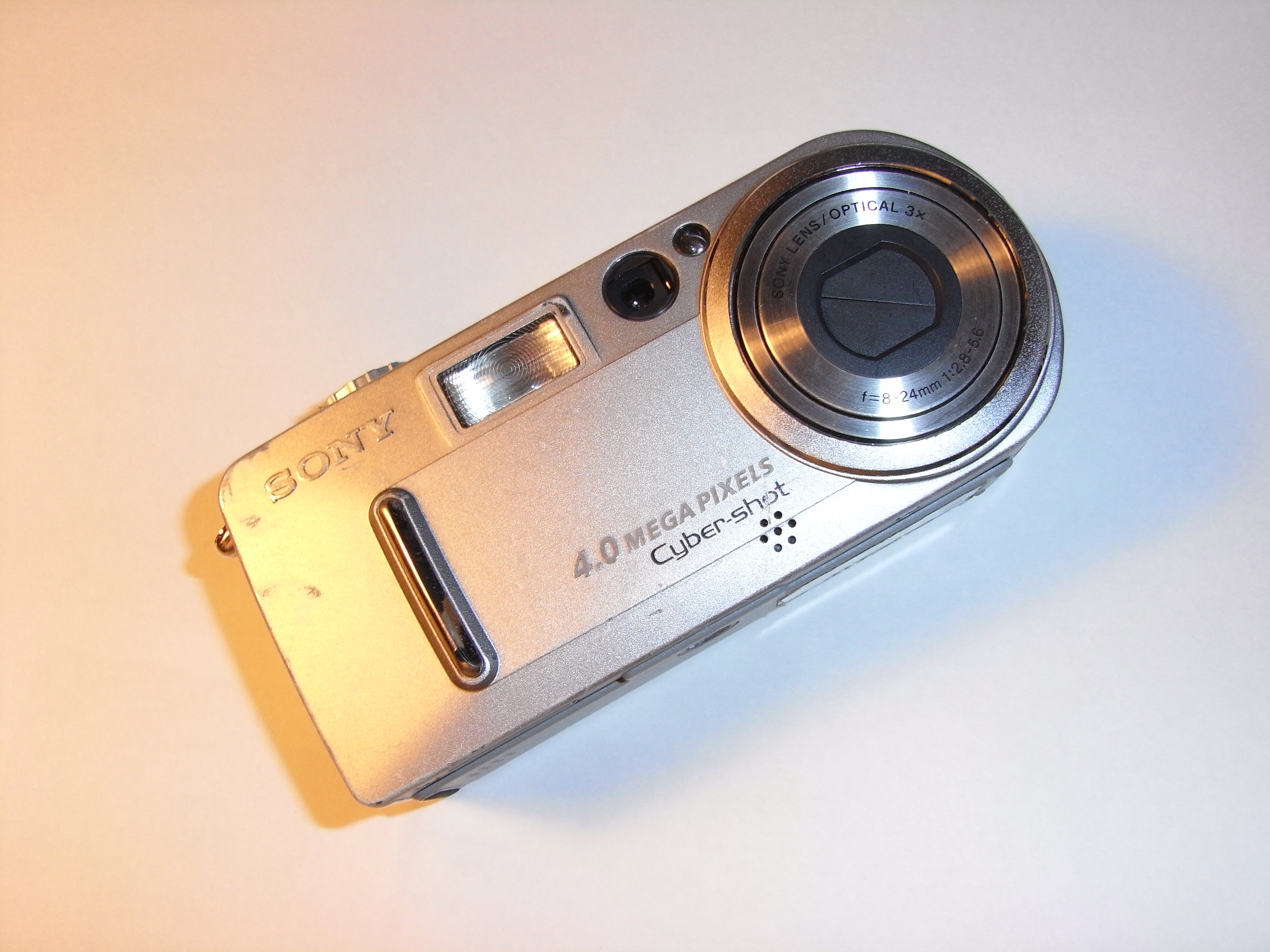
Sony Cyber-Shot DSC-P9 (2002)

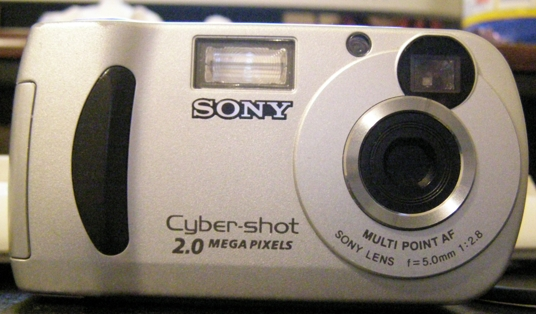
Sony Cyber-Shot DSC-P31 (2002)

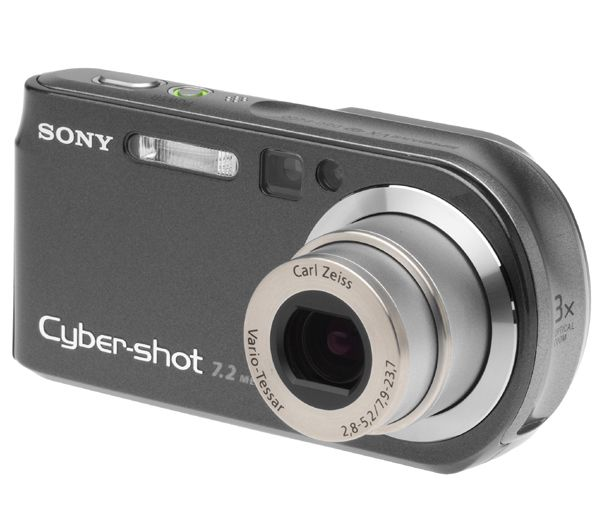
Sony Cyber-Shot DSC-P200 (2005)

Ultra-compact cameras with distinctive rounded edge on one side

- DSC-P1 (2000, 1.5" LCD, 3 MP, 3× optical zoom)
- DSC-P2 (1.9 MP, 3× optical zoom)
- DSC-P3 (2.8 MP)
- DSC-P5 (1.5" LCD, 3.1 MP, 3× optical zoom)
- DSC-P7 (1.5" LCD, 3.1 MP, 3× optical zoom)
- DSC-P8 (2003, 1.5" LCD, 3.1 MP, 3× optical zoom)
- DSC-P9 (2002, 1.5" LCD, 4.0 MP, 3× optical zoom)
- DSC-P10 (2003, 1.5" LCD, 5.0 MP, 3× optical zoom)
- DSC-P12 (Same as DSC-P10, packaged with more accessories)
- DSC-P20 (2001–2002, 1.1 MP, 3× digital zoom)
- DSC-P30 (2001–2003, 1.2 MP)
- DSC-P31 (2002–2003, 2 MP, 3× digital zoom)
- DSC-P32 (2003, 3.2 MP, 1.6× digital zoom)
- DSC-P41 (2004, 4.1 MP, fixed lens)
- DSC-P43 (2004, 4.1 MP, fixed lens)
- DSC-P50 (2001, 2.1 MP, 3× optical zoom)
- DSC-P51 (2002, 2.1 MP, 2× optical zoom)
- DSC-P52 (2003, 3.2 MP, 2× optical zoom)
- DSC-P71 (2002, 3.2 MP, 3× optical zoom)
- DSC-P72 (2003, 3.2 MP, 3× optical zoom)
- DSC-P73 (2004, 4.1 MP, 3× optical zoom)
- DSC-P92 (2003, 5 MP, 3× optical zoom)
- DSC-P93 (2004, 5.0 MP, 3× optical zoom)
- DSC-P100 (2004, 5.1 MP, 3× optical zoom)
- DSC-P120 (special edition version of DSC-P100)
- DSC-P150 (2004, 7.2 MP, 3× optical zoom)
- DSC-P200 (2005, 7.2 MP, 3× optical zoom)

== QX series ==
Lens-style compact cameras designed exclusively for use with smartphones.

- DSC-QX10 (2013, 18.2 MP, 1/2.3 inch (7.76 mm) Exmor R CMOS sensor, 10× optical zoom, f/3.3–5.9 Sony G Lens)
- DSC-QX30 (2014, 20.4 MP, 1/2.3 inch (7.82 mm) Exmor R CMOS sensor, 30× optical zoom, ƒ/3.5–6.3 Sony G Lens)
- DSC-QX100 (2014, 20.2 MP, 1-inch (13.2×8.8 mm) Exmor R CMOS sensor, 3.6× optical zoom, f/1.8–4.9 Carl ZEISS® Vario-Sonnar T* lens)
- ILCE-QX1 (2014, 20.1 MP, APS-C (23.2×15.4 mm) CMOS sensor, interchangeable E-mount lens)

== R series ==
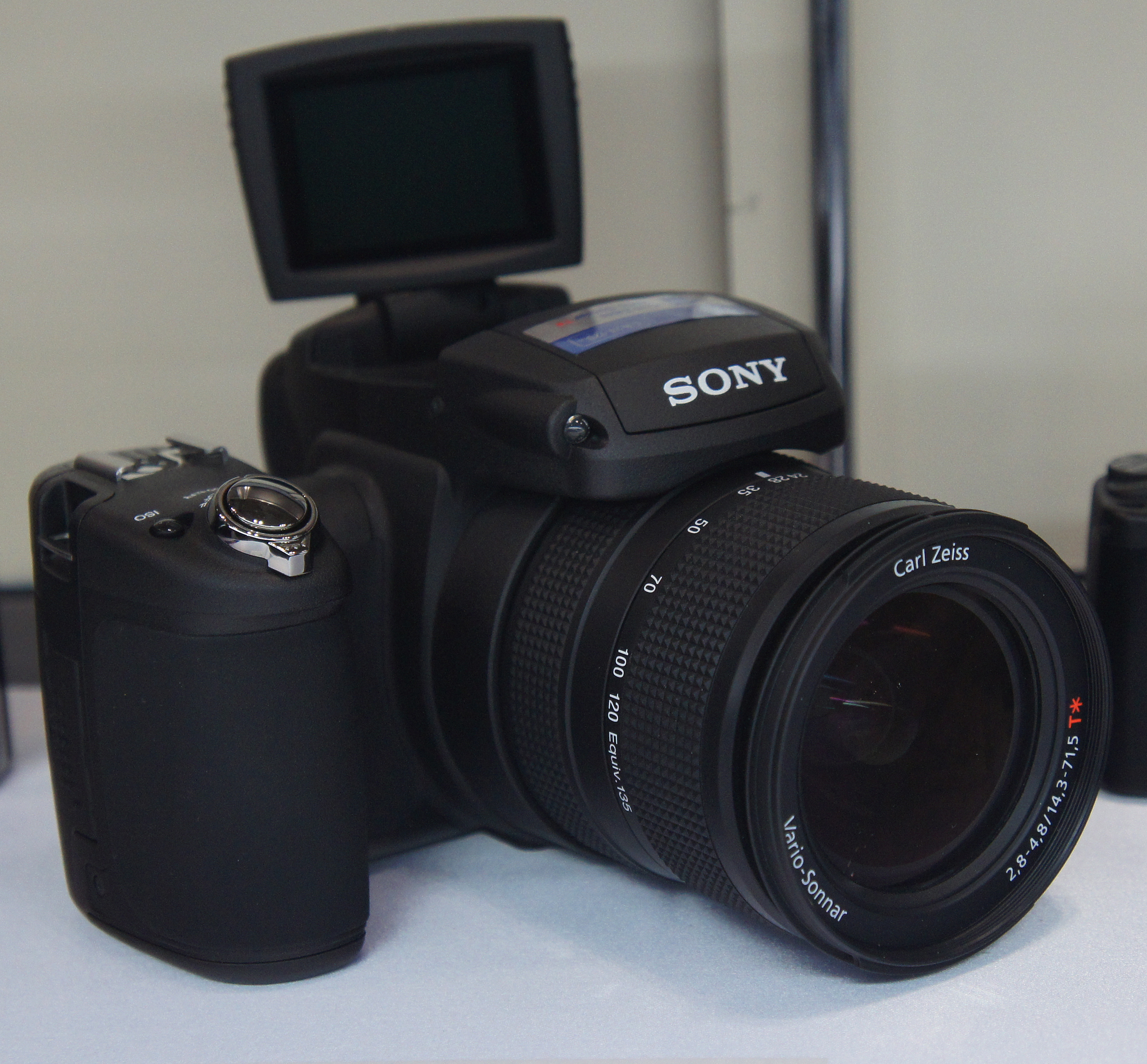
Sony Cyber-shot DSC-R1 (2005)

Bridge camera with large sensor

- DSC-R1 (2005–2006, 10.3-MP APS-C. 5× 24–120 mm equivalent optical zoom, first Cyber-shot to use CMOS)

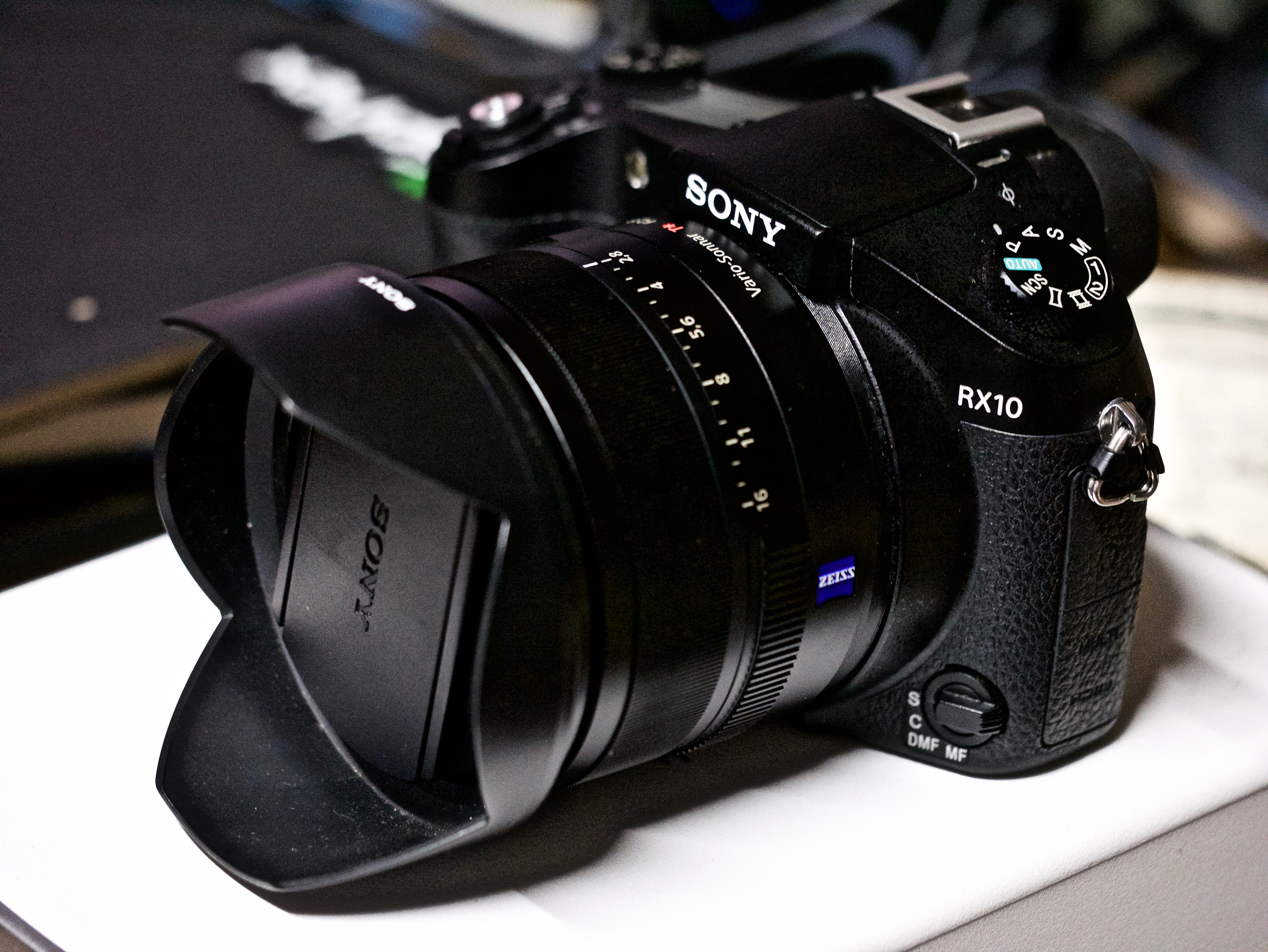
Sony Cyber-shot DSC-RX10 (2014)

== RX series ==
- RX100 series – compact cameras with 1.0" type 20.2-MP sensors
  - DSC-RX100 (2012, Exmor CMOS sensor with 28-100mm f1.8–4.9 Carl Zeiss Vario-Sonnar T* lens)
  - DSC-RX100 II (2013, Exmor R BSI-CMOS sensor with 28-100mm f1.8–4.9 Carl Zeiss Vario-Sonnar T* lens)
  - DSC-RX100 III (2014, Exmor R BSI-CMOS sensor with 24-70mm f1.8–2.8 Carl Zeiss Vario-Sonnar T* lens)
  - DSC-RX100 IV (2015, Exmor RS Stacked-CMOS sensor with 24-70mm f1.8–2.8 Carl Zeiss Vario-Sonnar T* lens)
  - DSC-RX100 V (2016, Exmor RS Stacked-CMOS sensor with 24–70mm f1.8-2.8 Carl Zeiss Vario-Sonnar T* lens)
  - DSC-RX100 VI (2018, Exmor RS Stacked-CMOS sensor with 24–200mm f2.8-4.5 Carl Zeiss Vario-Sonnar T* lens)
  - DSC-RX100 VII (2019, Exmor RS Stacked-CMOS sensor with 24–200mm f2.8-4.5 Carl Zeiss Vario-Sonnar T* lens)
- RX10 series – bridge cameras with 1.0" sensors
  - DSC-RX10 (2013, 1.0" type 20-MP BSI-CMOS sensor with fixed zoom lens Carl Zeiss Sonnar T* 24–200mm (equivalent 35mm) F2.8 along the zoom range), BIONZ X processor as Sony α7, has 3 EV built-in ND filter, 10fps, Wi-Fi, and NFC. Capable for high video quality shoot with stepless aperture control, headphone and mic sockets, focus peaking, zebra exposure warning, and uncompressed video output.
  - DSC-RX10 II (2015, 20-MP BSI-CMOS sensor, BIONZ X processor)
  - DSC-RX10 III (2016)
  - DSC-RX10 IV (2017)
  - DSC-RX10 V (2026)
- RX1 series – compact full-frame cameras with a fixed 35mm f/2.0 Carl Zeiss Sonnar T* lenses
  - DSC-RX1 / DSC-RX1R (2012, 24-MP Exmor CMOS sensor)
  - DSC-RX1R II (2015, 42.4-MP Exmor R BSI-CMOS sensor) BIONZ X image processor
  - DSC-RX1R III (2025, 60-MP Exmor R BSI-CMOS sensor) BIONZ XR image processor with AI

== S series ==
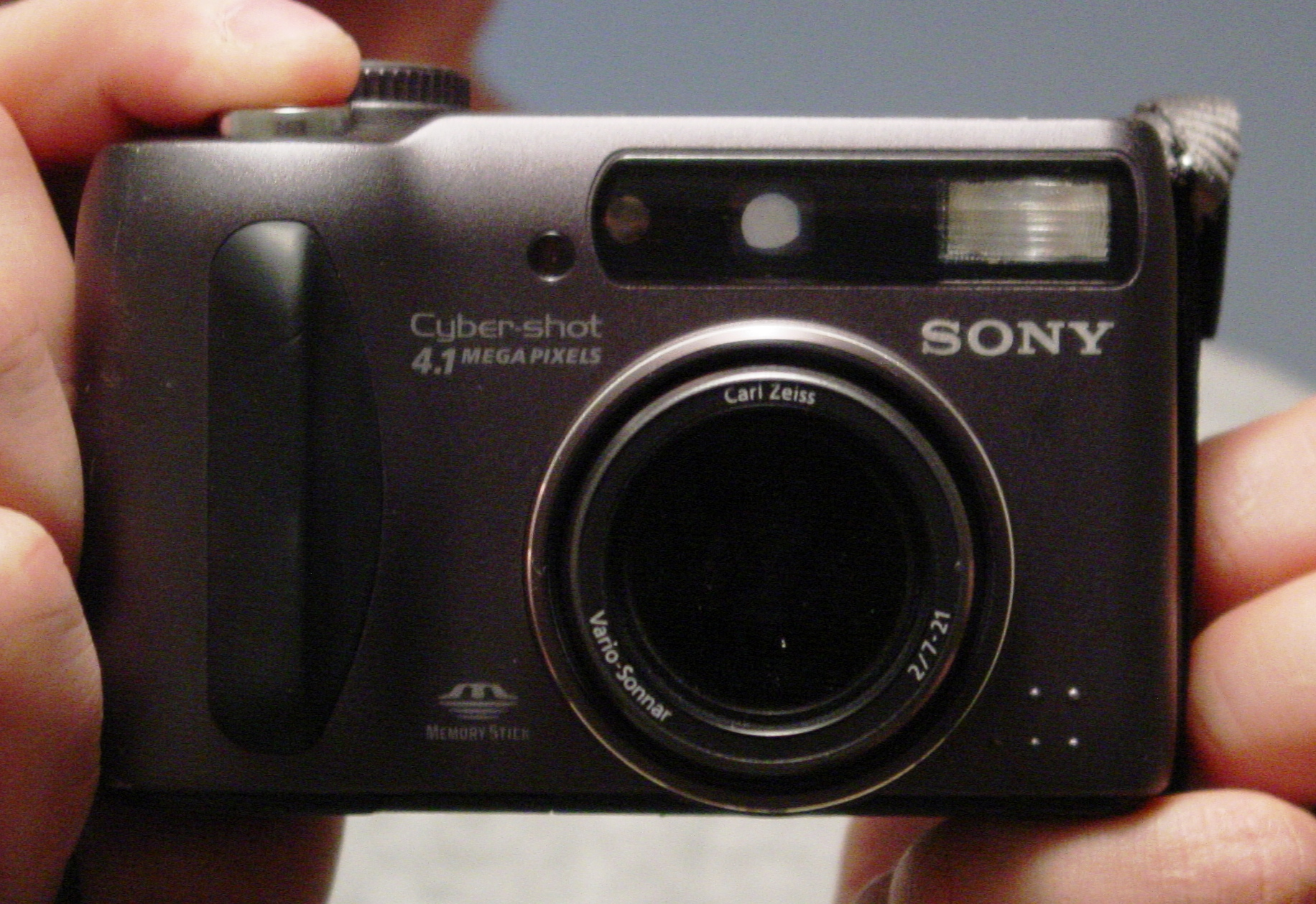
Sony Cyber-shot DSC-S85 (2001)

The DSC-S85 (released in 2001), was the first 4-MP consumer-level digital camera.

- DSC-S30 (2000, 1.3 MP, 3× optical zoom)
- DSC-S40 (2005, 4.0 MP, 3× optical zoom)
- DSC-S45
- DSC-S50 (2000, 2.1 MP, 3× optical zoom)
- DSC-S60 (2005, 2" LCD, 4.0 MP)
- DSC-S70 (2000, 3.3 MP)
- DSC-S75 (2001, 3.3 MP)
- DSC-S80 (2005, 4.1 MP, 3× optical zoom)
- DSC-S85 (2001, 4.1 MP, 3× optical zoom)
- DSC-S90 (2005, 4.1 MP, 3× optical zoom)
- DSC-S500 (6.0 MP. 3× optical zoom)
- DSC-S600 (2006, 6.0 MP. 3× optical zoom)
- DSC-S650 (2007, 7.2 MP, 3× optical zoom)
- DSC-S700 (2007, 7.2 MP, 3× optical zoom)
- DSC-S730 (2008, 7.2 MP. 3× optical zoom)
- DSC-S750 (2008, 7.2 MP. 3× optical zoom)
- DSC-S780 (2008, 8.1 MP. 3× optical zoom)
- DSC-S800 (2007, 8.1 MP. 6× optical zoom)
- DSC-S930 (2009, 10.1 MP. 3× optical zoom)
- DSC-S950 (2009, 10.1 MP. 4× optical zoom)
- DSC-S980 (2009, 12.1 MP. ម4× optical zoom)
- DSC-S2000 (2010, 10.1 MP. 3× optical zoom)
- DSC-S2100 (2010, 12.1 MP. 3× optical zoom)
- DSC-S3000 (2011, 10.1 MP, 3× optical zoom)

Product	Production	Sensor specifications	Lens	Size WxHxD (mm)	LCD Screen	Video specifications	Removable media format	Battery
High-end S series
DSC-S30	February 2000	1.3 MP 1280×960 1/2.7" CCD	39-117mm f/2.8-2.9	113×68×69	2" 123,000 tilting 180 degree	No	Original memory stick	NP-FM50
DSC-S50	February 2000	2 MP 1600×1200 1/2.7" CCD	39-117mm f/2.8-2.9	113×68×69	2" 123,000 tilting 180 degree	320×240 8.333fps 15s 160×112 8.333fps 60s	Original memory stick	NP-FM50
DSC-S70	February 2000	3.2 MP 2048×1536 1/1.8" CCD	34-102mm f/2-2.5	117×70×65	1.8" 123,000	320×240 8.333fps 15s 160×112 8.333fps 60s	Original memory stick	NP-FM50
DSC-S75	February 2001	3.2 MP 2048×1536 1/1.8" CCD	34-102mm f/2-2.5	120×74×63	1.8" 123,000	320×240 16.666fps 15s 320×240 8.333fps	Original memory stick	NP-FM50
DSC-S85	June 2001	3.8 MP 2272×1704 1/1.8" CCD	34-102mm f/2-2.5	120×74×63	1.8" 123,000	320×240 16.666fps 15s 320×240 8.333fps	Original memory stick	NP-FM50
Mid-end S series
DSC-S40	February 2005	4.1 MP 2034×1728 1/2.7" CCD	32-96mm f/2.8-5.2	99×52×34	1.5" 77,000	640×480 30fps 640×480 16.666fps 160×112 8.333fps	Original memory stick	2× AA
DSC-S60 / S80 (Has manual mode)	May 2005	4.1 MP 2304×1728 1/2.7" CCD	39-117mm f/2.8-5.2	97×64×40	2" 115,000	640×480 30fps 640×480 16.666fps 160×112 8.333fps	Original memory stick	2× AA
DSC-S90 (Has manual mode)	May 2005	4.1 MP 2304×1728 1/2.7" CCD	39-117mm f/2.8-5.2	97×64×40	2.5" 115,000	640×480 30fps 640×480 16.666fps 160×112 8.333fps	Original memory stick	2× AA
DSC-S600	January 2006	6 MP 2816×2112 1/2.5" CCD	31-93mm f/2.8-5.1	99.9×52×36.8 mm	2" 85,000	640×480 30fps 640×480 16.666fps 160×112 8.333fps	Memory Stick Duo	2× AA
Low-end S series
DSC-S45	???	5.2 MP 2592×1944 1/2.5" CCD	32-96mm f/2.8-4.8	91.4×66×33	2.4" 110,000	320×240 30fps	Memory Stick Duo	2× AA
DSC-S500	June 2006	6 MP 2816×2112 1/2.5" CCD	32-96mm f/2.8-4.8	93×63×32	2.4" 110,000	320×240 30fps	Memory Stick Duo	2× AA
DSC-S650	January 2007	7.2 MP 3072×2304 1/2.5" CCD	35-105mm f/2.8-4.8	91×61×27	2" 115,000	320×240 30fps	Memory Stick Duo	2× AA
DSC-S700	January 2007	7.2 MP 3072×2304 1/2.5" CCD	35-105mm f/2.8-4.8	91×61×27	2.4" 112,000	320×240 30fps	Memory Stick Duo	2× AA
DSC-S800	May 2007	8 MP 3264×2448 1/1.8"	37-222mm f/2.8-4.8	93×63×39	2.5" 230,000	320×240 30fps	Memory Stick Duo	2× AA
DSC-S730	December 2007	7.2 MP 3072×2304 1/2.5" CCD	35-105mm f/2.8-4.8	91×61×29	2.4" 112,000	320×240 30fps	Memory Stick Duo	2× AA
DSC-S750	January 2008	7.2 MP 3072×2304 1/2.5" CCD	35-105mm f/2.8-4.8	90.8×56×26.5	2.5" 153,000	320×240 30fps	Memory Stick Duo	2× AA
DSC-S780	January 2008	8 MP 3264×2448 1/2.5" CCD	35-105mm f/2.8-4.8	90.8×56×26.5	2.5" 153,000	320×240 30fps	Memory Stick Duo	2× AA
DSC-S930	January 2009	10 MP 3648×2736 1/2.3" CCD	38-108mm f/2.9-5.4	90×61×26	2.4" 112,000	320×240 30fps	Memory Stick Duo	2× AA
DSC-S950	February 2009	10 MP 3648×2736 1/2.3" CCD	33-132mm f/2.5-5.6	93×56×24	2.7" 230,000	320×240 30fps	Memory Stick Duo	NP-BK1
DSC-S980	February 2009	12 MP 4000×3000 1/2.3" CCD	33-132mm f/2.5-5.6	93×56×24	2.7" 230,000	320×240 30fps	Memory Stick Duo	NP-BK1
DSC-S2000	January 2010	10 MP 3456×2592 1/2.3" CCD	35-105mm f/3.1-5.6	97.6×61×27.2	2.5" 230,000	640×480 30fps	Memory Stick Duo / SD	2×AA
DSC-S2100	January 2010	12 MP 4000×3000 1/2.3" CCD	35-105mm f/3.1-5.6	97.6×61×27.2	3" 230,000	640×480 30fps	Memory Stick Duo / SD	2×AA
DSC-S3000	2011	10 MP 3456×2592 1/2.3" CCD	28-112mm f/3-5.7	99×61×29.3	2.7" 230,000	640×480 30fps	Memory Stick Duo / SD	2×AA

== T series ==
Ultra-thin compact cameras. The "T" series with CCD sensor, while the "TX" series with CMOS sensor

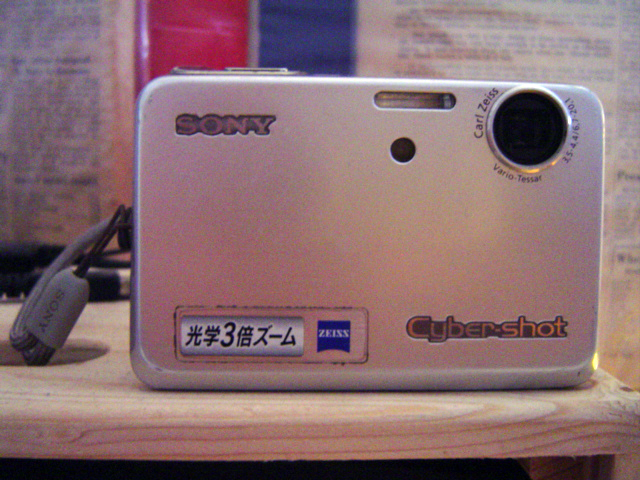
Sony Cyber-shot DSC-T3 (2004)

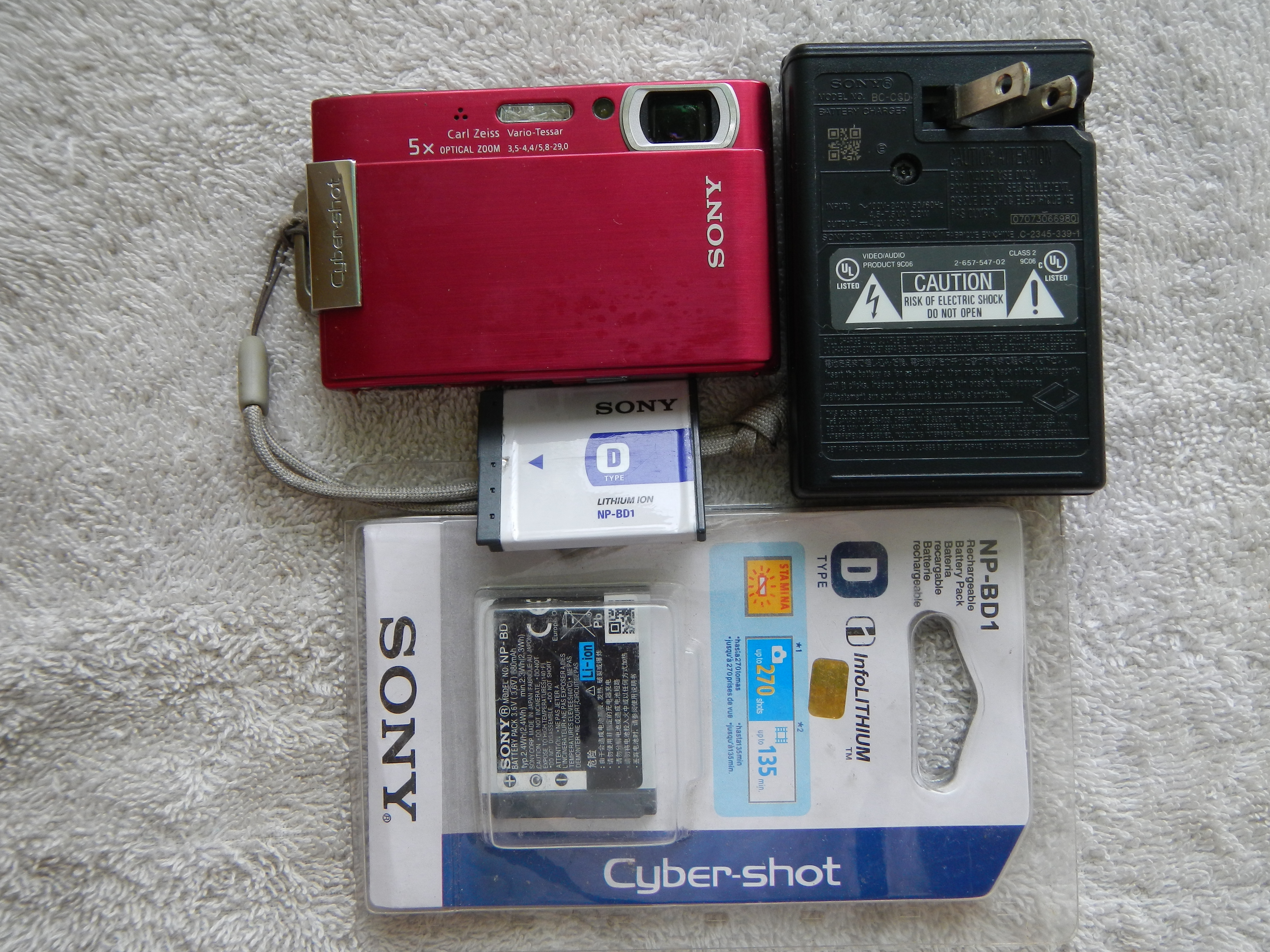
2007 Sony Cyber-shot DSC-T200 [Compact Sensor – 5× optical zoom – CCD – built-in flash – ISO 3200 – Carl Zeiss 3× optical zoom and the Sony Double Anti-Blur Solution, 3.5-inch touch screen LCD, 8.1 MP].

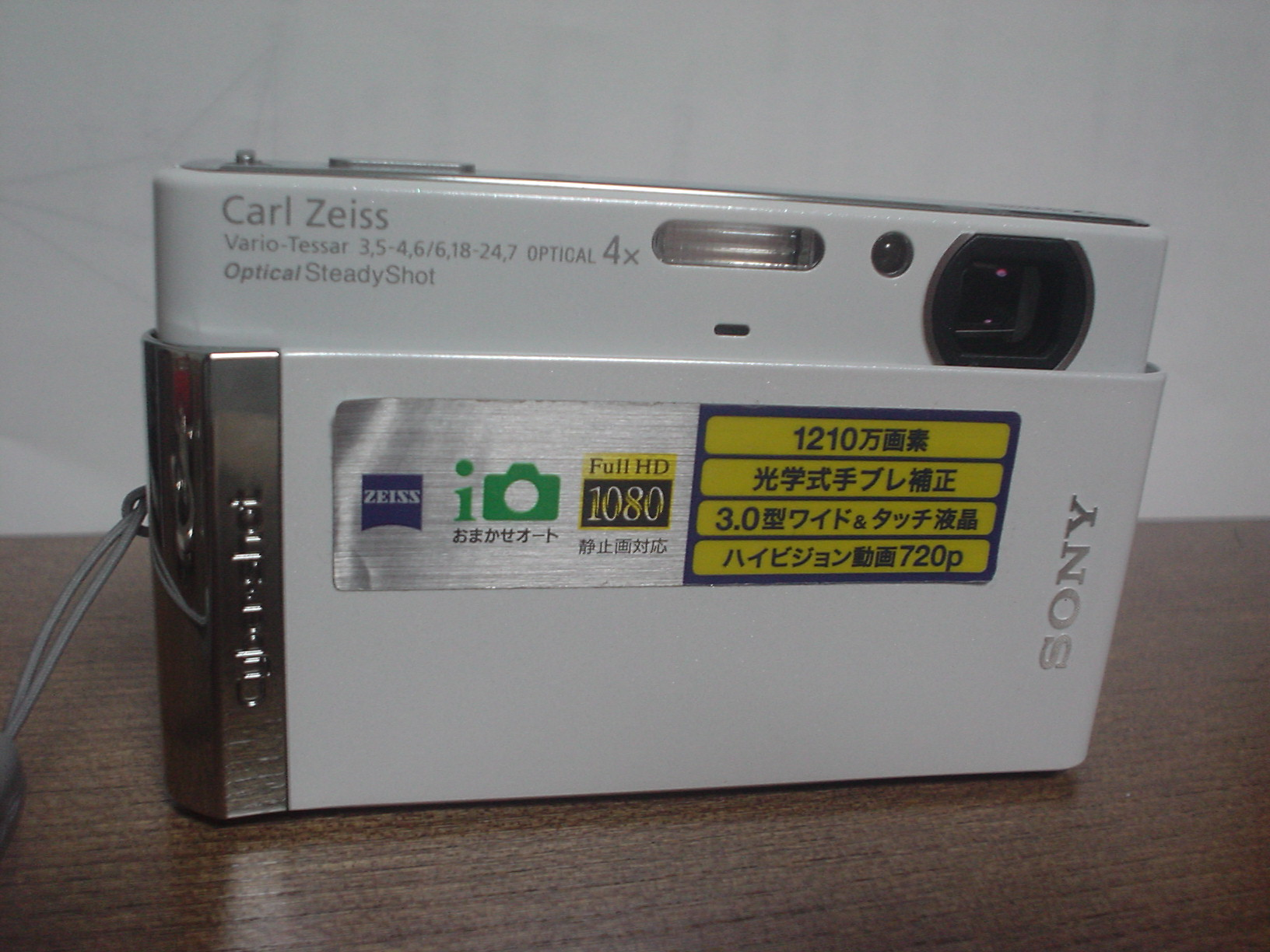
Sony Cyber-shot DCS-T90 (2009)

- DSC-T1 (Jan 2004, 5.1 MP. 3× optical zoom)
- DSC-T1C (2004, 7.2 MP. 3× optical zoom)
- DSC-T2 (Dec 2007, 2.7" LCD touch screen, 8.1 MP. 3× optical zoom, 4GB internal storage)
- DSC-T3 (2004, 2.5" LCD, 5.1 MP, 3× optical zoom)
- DSC-T5 (Sep 2005, 2.5" LCD, 5 MP, 3× optical zoom)
- DSC-T7 (May 2005, 2.5" LCD, 5.1 MP, 3× optical zoom)
- DSC-T9 (Jan 2006, 2.5" LCD, 6 MP, 3× optical zoom)
- DSC-T10 (Aug 2006, 2.5" LCD, 7.2 MP, 3× optical zoom)
- DSC-T11 (2004, 5.0 MP, 3× optical zoom)
- DSC-T20 (Apr 2007, 8.0 MP, 3× optical zoom)
- DSC-T30 (May 2006, 3" LCD, 7.2 MP, 3× optical zoom)
- DSC-T33 (Mar 2005, 5.1 MP, 3× optical zoom)
- DSC-T50 (Oct 2006, 3.0" LCD touch screen, 7.2 MP. 3× optical zoom)
- DSC-T70 (Sep 2007, 3.0-inch LCD touch screen, 8.1 MP, 3× optical zoom)
- DSC-T75 (2007, 3.0-inch LCD touch screen, 8.1 MP, 3× optical zoom)
- DSC-T77 (Sep 2008, 3.0-inch LCD touch screen, 10.1 MP, 4× optical zoom)
- DSC-T90 (Mar 2009, 3.0-inch LCD touch screen, 12.1 MP, 4× optical zoom, 720p HD Video)
- DSC-T99 (Aug 2010, 3.0-inch touch screen 14.1 MP, 720p HD Video, Sweep Panorama, 4× optical zoom, personalisation)
- DSC-T100 (Mar 2007, 3.0-inch LCD, 8.0 MP. 5× optical zoom)
- DSC-T200 (Sep 2007, 3.5-inch touch screen LCD, 8.1 MP, 5× optical zoom)
- DSC-T300 (Mar 2008, 3.5-inch touch screen LCD, 10.1 MP, 5× optical zoom)
- DSC-T500 (Oct 2008, 3.5-inch touch screen LCD, 10.1 MP, 5× optical zoom, 720p HD Video)
- DSC-T700 (Sep 2008, 3.5-inch touch screen LCD, 4 GB internal memory, 10.1 MP, 4× optical zoom)
- DSC-T900 (Mar 2009, 3.5-inch touch screen LCD, 12.1 MP, 4× optical zoom, 720p HD Video)
- DSC-TX1 (Sep 2009, 3.0-inch touch screen, 10.2 MP, 720p HD Video, Sweep Panorama, 4× optical zoom, personalisation)
- DSC-TX5 (Mar 2010, 3.0-inch touch screen, 10.2 MP, 720p HD Video, Sweep Panorama, 4× optical zoom, personalization, waterproof, dustproof, shockproof, freeze-proof)
- DSC-TX7 (Jan 2010, 3.5-inch touch screen, 10.2 MP, 1080i Full HD Video, Sweep Panorama, 4× optical zoom, personalisation)
- DSC-TX9 (Aug 2010, 3.5-inch touch screen, 12.2 MP, 1080i Full HD Video, 3D Sweep Panorama, 4× optical zoom, personalisation)
- DSC-TX10 (Mar 2011, 3.0-inch touch screen, 16.2 MP, 1080i Full HD Video, 3D Sweep Panorama, 3D stills, 4× optical zoom, personalization, waterproof, dustproof, shockproof, freeze-proof)
- DSC-T110 (Mar 2011, 3.0-inch touch screen, 16.2 MP, 720p HD Video, Intelligent Sweep Panorama, 4× optical zoom)
- DSC-TX20 (May 2012, 3.0-inch touch screen, 16.2 MP Exmor R CMOS, 4× optical zoom, 1080p Full HD Video, waterproof, shockproof)
- DSC-TX55 (Sep 2011, 3.3-inch OLED, 16.2-MP Exmor R CMOS, 5× optical zoom, 10× Clear Image zoom / 26 mm wide angle, AVCHD Full HD Video, OLED, Sweep Panorama)
- DSC-TX66 (Mar 2012, 3.3-inch OLED touch screen, 18.2 MP, Exmor R CMOS sensor, slim as an AA battery, Full HD 1080p60i Video, high speed AF, 5× optical zoom, 10× Clear Image zoom, up to 10fps)
- DSC-TX100V (Mar 2011，3.5-inch touch screen, 16.2-MP CMOS sensor, 4× optical zoom, Full HD 1080i Video, 3D Sweep Panorama, 3D stills, transfer jet technology, HDMI output, GPS, Compass)
- DSC-TX200V (Mar 2012, 3.3-inch OLED touch screen, 18.2 MP, Full HD 1080p60 Video)
- DSC-TX300V (Mar 2012, 3.3-inch OLED touch screen, 18.2 MP, Japan release only)
- DSC-TF1 (Jan 2013, 2.7-inch LCD (not touch-screen), 16.1 MP)
- DSC-TX30 (Mar 2013, 3.3-inch OLED touch screen, 18.2-MP, 5× optical zoom, waterproof, shockproof, freezeproof, dustproof)

== U series ==
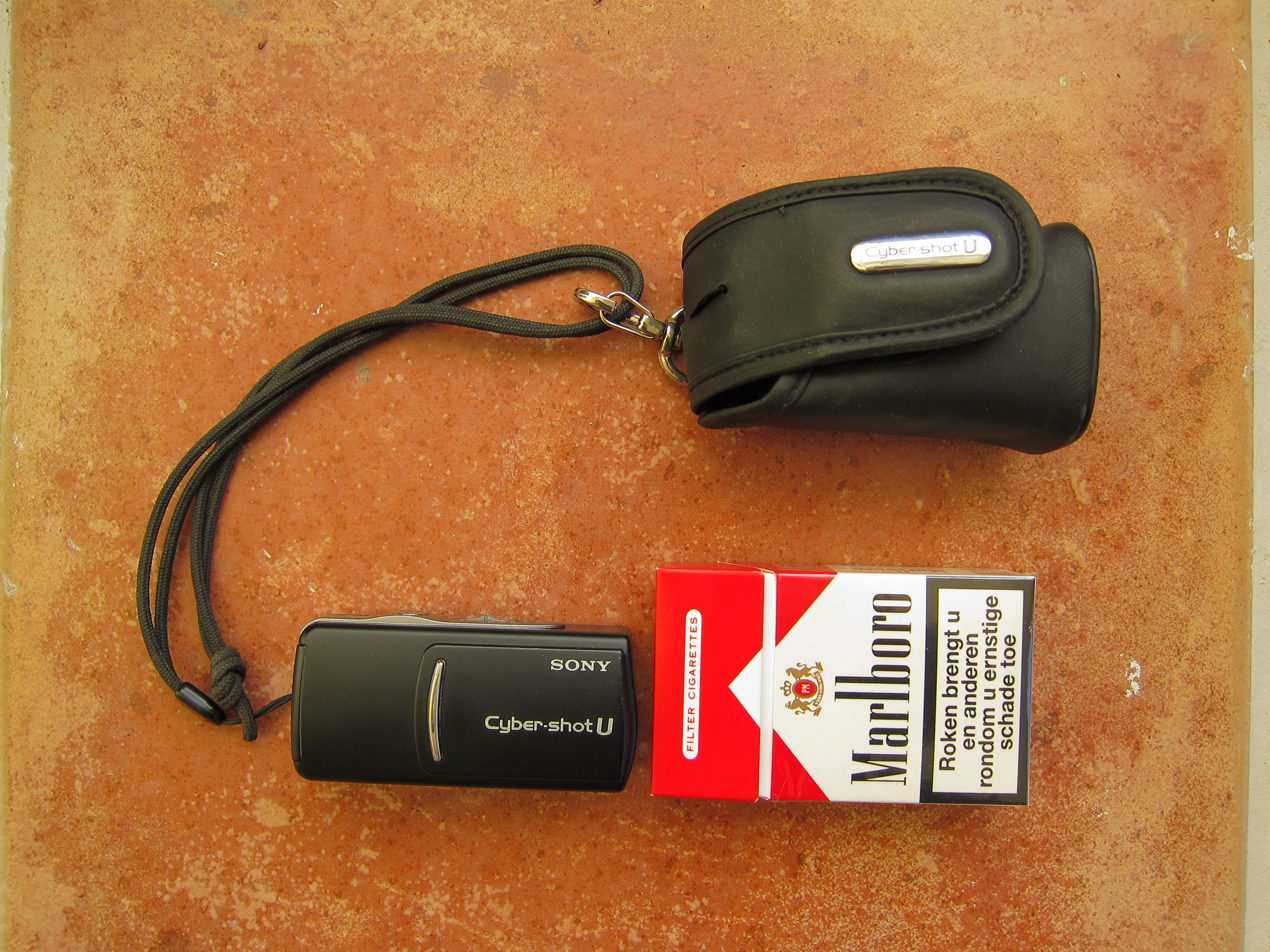
Sony Cyber-shot DSC-U20 (2002)

Sub-miniature cameras using 2×AAA batteries

- DSC-U10 (Jul 2002, 1.3 MP)
- DSC-U20 (Dec 2002, 2.0 MP)
- DSC-U30 (Jun 2003, 2.0 MP)
- DSC-U40 (Oct 2003, 2.0 MP)
- DSC-U50 (Aug 2003, 2.0 MP)
- DSC-U60 (Jun 2003, 2.0 MP, waterproof)

Product	Production	Sensor specifications	Lens	Size WxHxD (mm)	LCD Screen	Video specifications	Specialty	Removable media format
DSC-U10	August 2002	1.3 MP 1280×960 1/2.7" CCD	33mm f/2.8	113×68×69	1" 64,000	160×112 8.33fps 15s	Lens cap that acts like a power switch	Original memory stick
DSC-U20	September 2002	2 MP 1632×1224 1/2.7" CCD	33mm f/2.8	85×48 29	1" 64,000	160×112 8.33fps 15s	Lens cap that acts like a power switch	Original memory stick
DSC-U30	May 2003	2 MP 1632×1224 1/2.7" CCD	33mm f/2.8	85×40×29	1" 64,000	160×112 8.33fps 15s	Lens cap that acts like a power switch	Original memory stick
DSC-U60	May 2003	2 MP 1632×1224 1/2.7" CCD	33mm f/2.8	60×117×43	1" 64,000	160×112 8.33fps 15s	Waterproof	Original memory stick
DSC-U50	August 2003	2 MP 1632×1224 1/2.7" CCD	33mm f/2.8	100×41×25	1" 64,000	160×112 8.33fps 15s	Tilting lens	Memory Stick Duo
DSC-U40	October 2003	2 MP 1632×1224 1/2.7" CCD	33mm f/2.8	83×39×26	1" 64,000	320×240 8.333fps	Lens cap that acts like a power switch	Memory Stick Duo

== V series ==
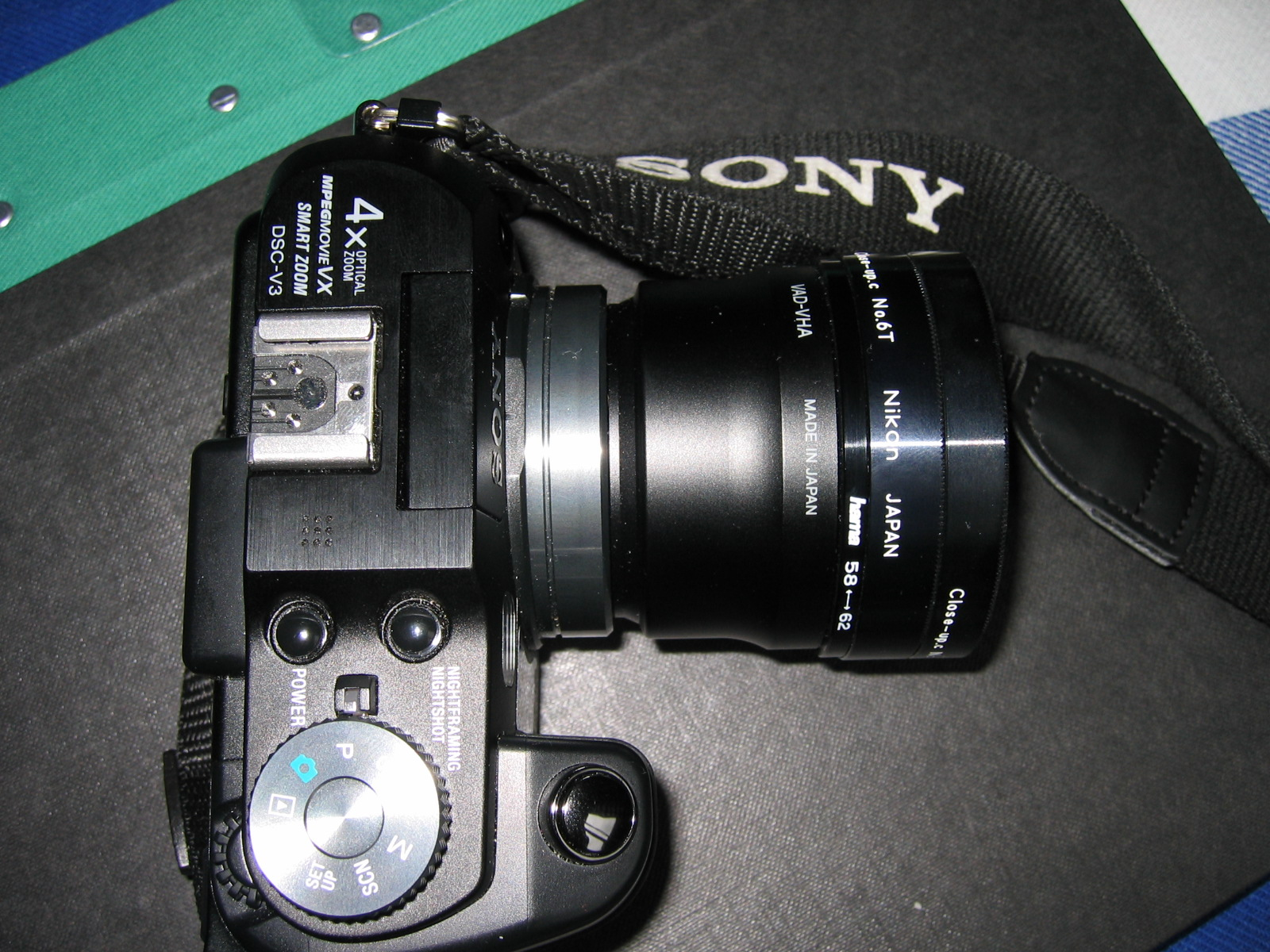
Sony Cyber-shot DSC-V3 (2004)

'Prosumer' level Bridge cameras

- DSC-V1 (2003, 1.5" LCD, 5.0 MP, 4× optical zoom)
- DSC-V3 (2004, 2.5" LCD, 7.1 MP, 4× optical zoom)

== W series ==
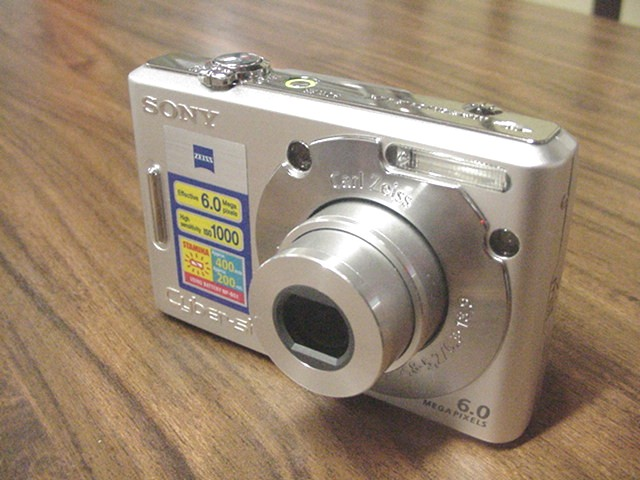
Sony Cyber-shot DSC-W30 (2006)

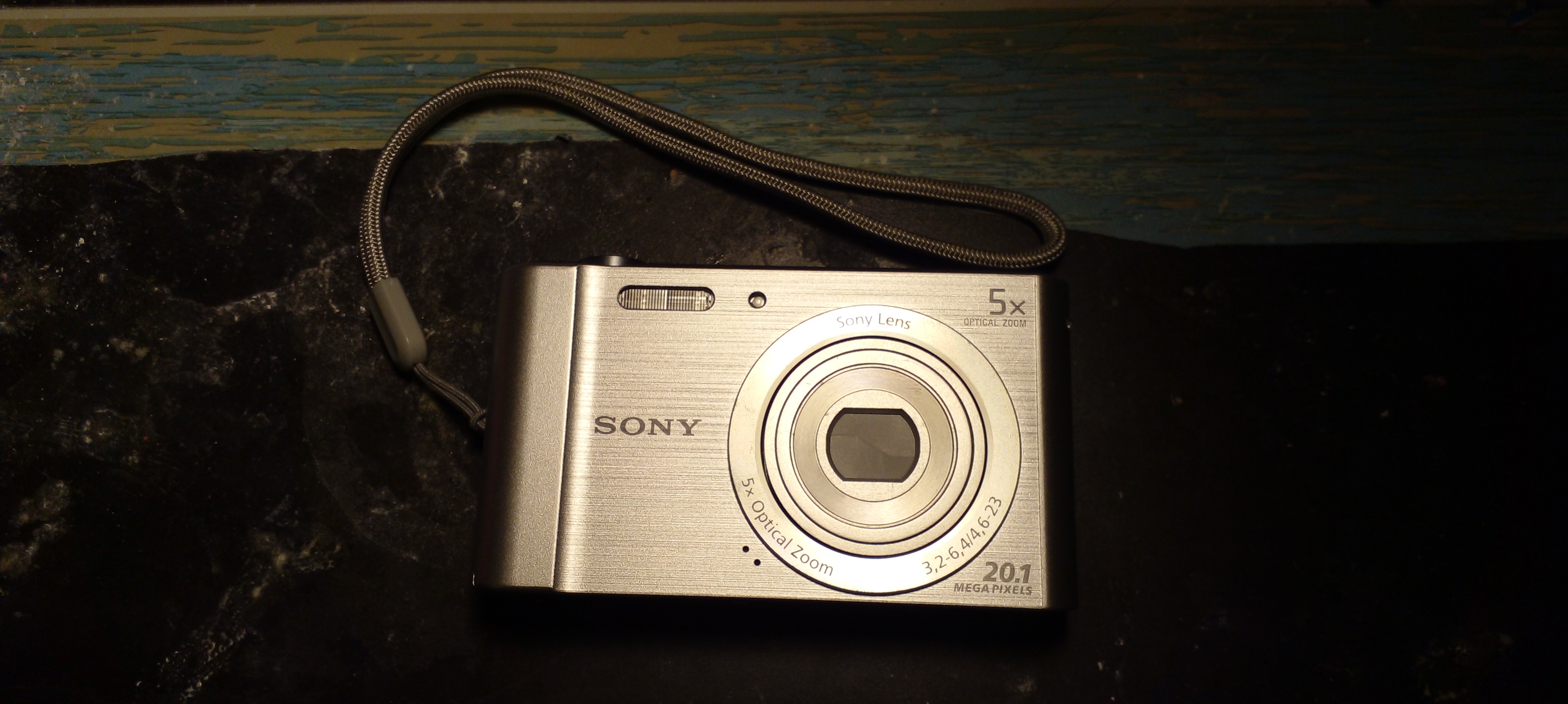
A Grey Sony Cyber-Shot DSC-W800 (2014)

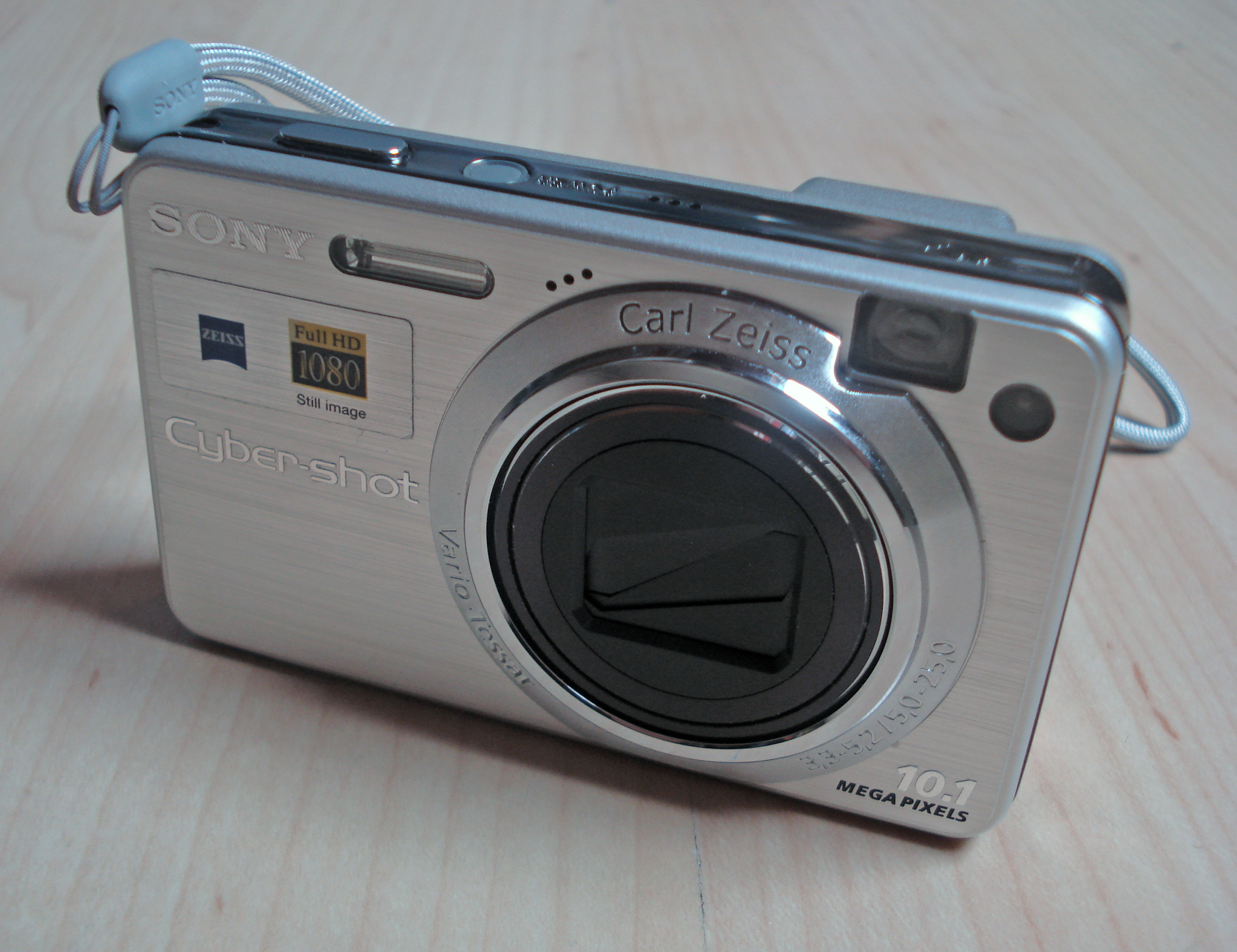
Sony Cyber-shot DSC-W170 (2008)

Cameras using a CCD Sensor and wide angle lens with a special coating.

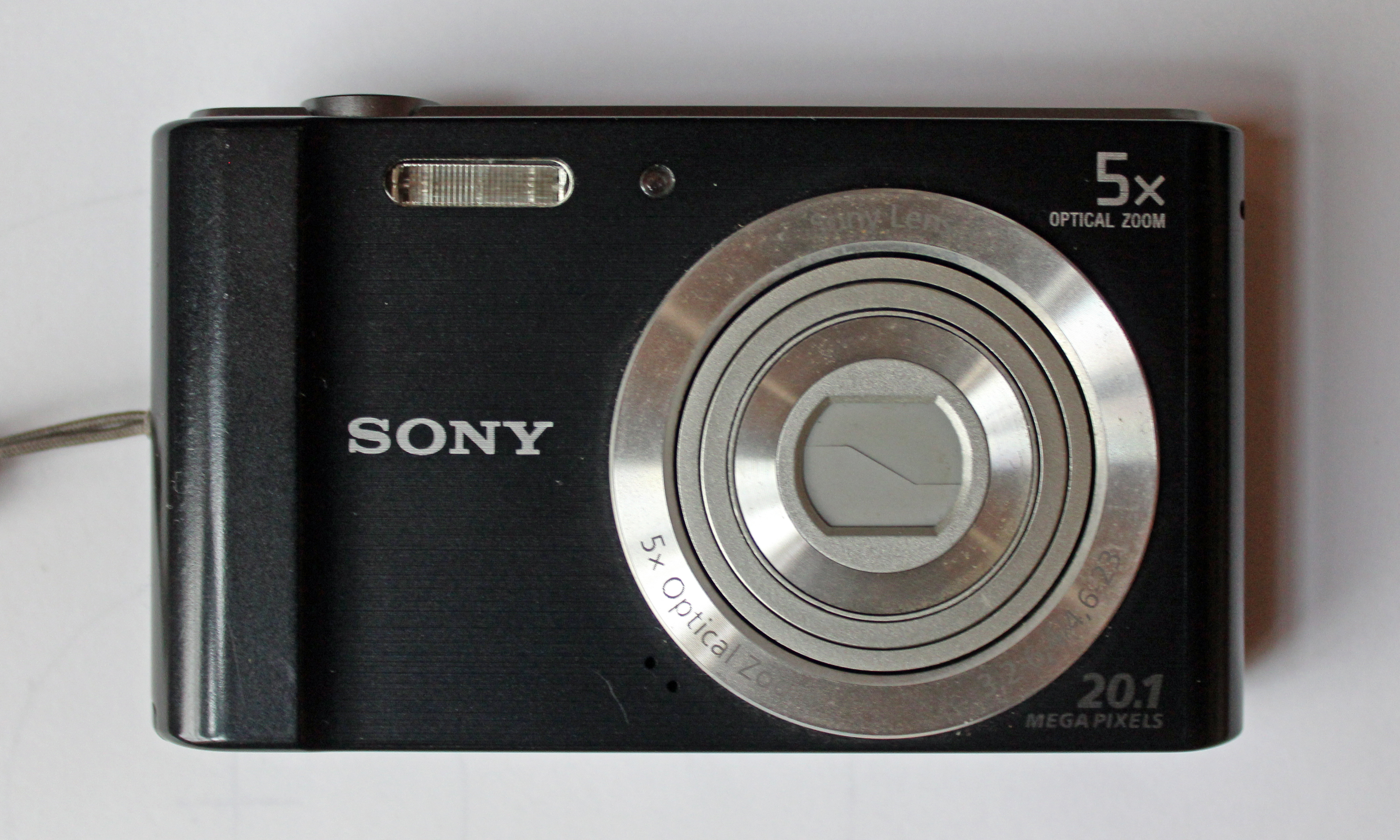
Black Sony Cyber-shot DSC-W800 (2014)

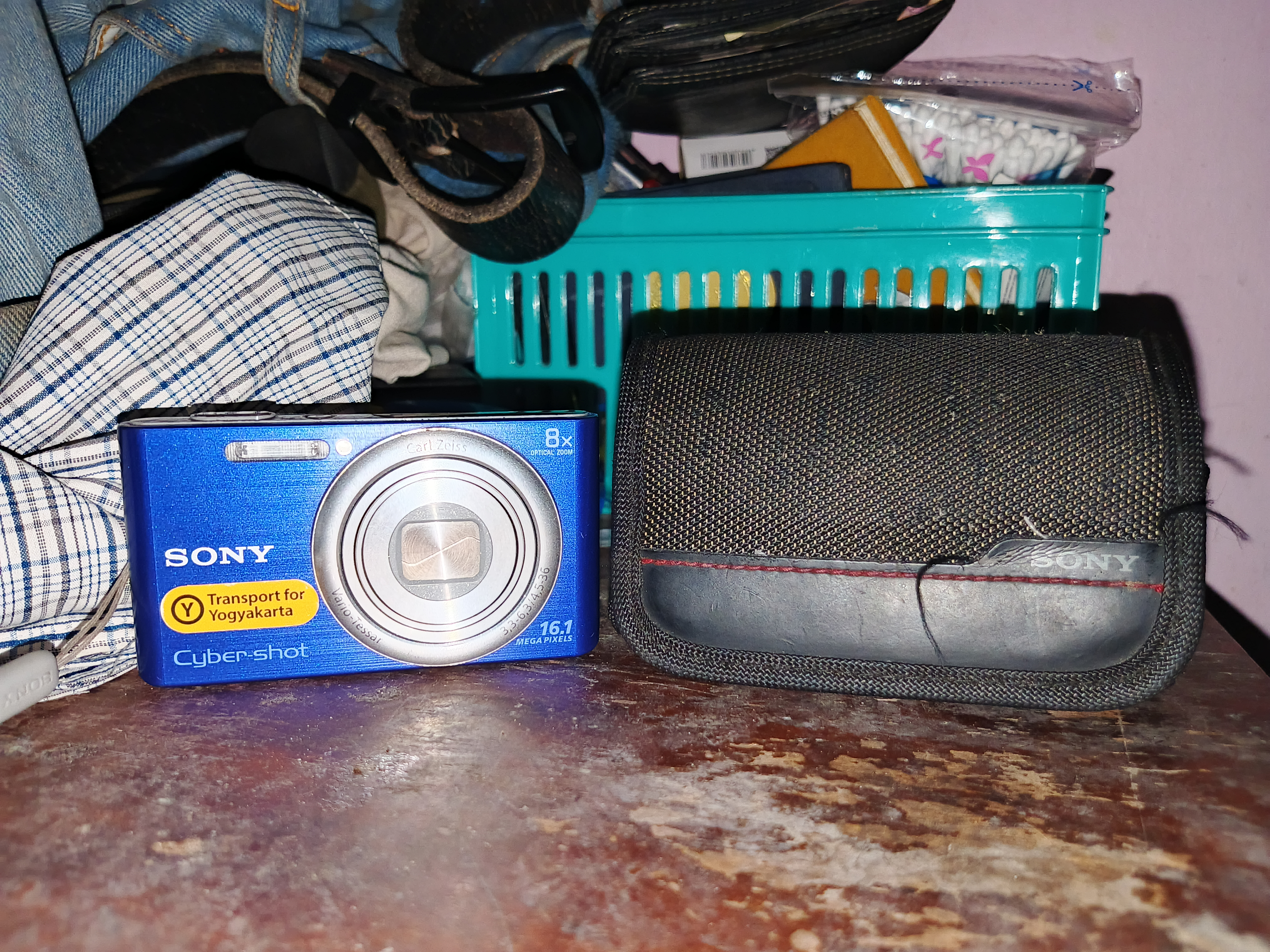
Blue Sony Cyber-shot DSC-W730 (2013) with its own camera bag

With point-and-shoot camera sales decreasing, Sony has not made a new model since 2014 and is likely to discontinue the lineup.

- DSC-W1 (2004, 5.1 MP, Manual mode, 3× optical zoom)
- DSC-W5/W15 (2005, 5.1 MP, Manual mode, 3× optical zoom)
- DSC-W7/W17 (2005, 7.1 MP, Manual mode, 3× optical zoom)
- DSC-W12 (2004, 5.1 MP, Manual mode, 3× optical zoom)
- DSC-W30 (2006, 6.0 MP, no Manual mode, 3× optical zoom)
- DSC-W35 (2007, 7.2 MP, no Manual mode, 3× optical zoom)
- DSC-W40 (2006, 6.0 MP, no Manual mode, 3× optical zoom)
- DSC-W50 (2006, 6.0 MP, no Manual mode, 3× optical zoom)
- DSC-W55 (2007, 7.2 MP, no Manual mode, 3× optical zoom)
- DSC-W70 (2006, 7.2 MP, no Manual mode, 3× optical zoom)
- DSC-W80 (2007, 7.2 MP, no Manual mode, 3× optical zoom, HDTV output)
- DSC-W90 (2007, 8.1 MP, 3× optical zoom)
- DSC-W100 (2006, 8.1 MP, Manual Mode, 3× optical zoom)
- DSC-W110 (2008, 7.2 MP, no Manual mode, 4× optical zoom)
- DSC-W115 (2008, 7.2 MP, no Manual mode, 4× optical zoom)
- DSC-W120 (2008, 7.2 MP, no Manual mode, 4× optical zoom)
- DSC-W130 (2008, 8.1 MP, no Manual mode, 4× optical zoom)
- DSC-W150 (2008, 8.1 MP, no Manual mode, 5× optical zoom)
- DSC-W170 (2008, 10.1 MP, no Manual mode, 5× optical zoom)
- DSC-W180 (2009, 10.1 MP, 3× optical zoom)
- DSC-W190 (2009, 12.1 MP, 3× optical zoom)
- DSC-W200 (2007, 12.1 MP, Manual Mode, 3× optical zoom)
- DSC-W210 (2009, 12.1 MP, no Manual mode, 4× optical zoom)
- DSC-W215 (2007, 12.1 MP, no Manual mode, 4× optical zoom)
- DSC-W220 (2009, 12.1 MP, no Manual mode, 4× optical zoom)
- DSC-W230 (2009, 12.1 MP, no Manual mode, 4× optical zoom)
- DSC-W270 (2009, 12.1 MP, no Manual mode, 5× optical zoom, HD Movie 720p)
- DSC-W290 (2009, 12.1 MP, no Manual mode, 5× optical zoom, HD Movie 720p)
- DSC-W300 (2008, 13.6 MP, Manual Mode, 3× optical zoom, 2.7" LCD)
- DSC-W310 (2010, 12.1 MP, 4× optical zoom, 2.7˝ LCD)
- DSC-W320 (2010, 14.1 MP, 4× optical zoom, 2.7˝ LCD)
- DSC-W330 (2010, 14.1 MP, 4× optical zoom, Full VGA Movie, 3.0˝ LCD)
- DSC-W350 (2010, 14.1 MP, 4× optical zoom, HD Movie 720p, 2.7˝ LCD)
- DSC-W360 (2010, 14.1 MP, 4× optical zoom, HD Movie 720p, 3.0˝ LCD)
- DSC-W370 (2010, 14.1 MP, 7× optical zoom, HD Movie 720p, 3.0˝ LCD)
- DSC-W380 (2010, 14.1 MP, 5× optical zoom, HD Movie 720p, 2.7˝ LCD)
- DSC-W390 (2010, 14.1 MP, 5× optical zoom, HD Movie 720p, 3.0˝ LCD)
- DSC-W510 (2011, 12.1 MP, 4× optical zoom, 2.7" LCD)
- DSC-W520 (2011, 14.1 MP, 5× optical zoom, 2.7" LCD)
- DSC-W530 (2011, 14.1 MP, 4× optical zoom, 2.7" LCD)
- DSC-W550 (2011, 14.1 MP, 4× optical zoom, 3.0" LCD)
- DSC-W560 (2011, 14.1 MP, 4× optical zoom, HD Movie 720p, 3.0" LCD)
- DSC-W570 (2011, 16.1 MP, 5× optical zoom, HD Movie 720p, 2.7" LCD)
- DSC-W580 (2011, 16.1 MP, 5× optical zoom, HD Movie 720p, 3.0" LCD)
- DSC-W610 (2012, 14.1 MP, 4× optical zoom, 2.6" LCD)
- DSC-W620 (2012, 14.1 MP, 5× optical zoom, HD Movie 720p, 2.6" LCD)
- DSC-W630 (2012, 16.1 MP, 5× optical zoom, HD Movie 720p, 2.6" LCD)
- DSC-W650 (2012, 16.1 MP, 5× optical zoom, HD Movie 720p, 3.0" LCD)
- DSC-W670 (2012, 16.1 MP, 6× optical zoom, HD Movie 720p, 2.6" LCD)
- DSC-W690 (2012, 16.1 MP, 10× optical zoom, HD Movie 720p, 3.0" LCD)
- DSC-W710 (2013, 16.1 MP, 5× optical zoom, HD Movie 720p, 2.7" LCD)
- DSC-W730 (2013, 16.1 MP, 8× optical zoom, HD Movie 720p, 2.7" LCD)
- DSC-W800 (2014, 20.1 MP, 5× optical zoom, HD Movie 720p, 2.7" LCD)
- DSC-W810 (2014, 20.1 MP, 6× optical zoom, HD Movie 720p, 2.7" LCD)
- DSC-W830 (2014, 20.1 MP, 8× optical zoom, HD Movie 720p, 2.7" LCD)

Model	Release date	Sensor specifications	Video functionalities	Lens (35mm equiv.) aperture	Optical zoom	optical image stabilization	LCD specifications	Removable media format	Battery	Dimensions WxHxD (mm)	Weight (with batteries)	Manual mode
DSC-W1 / W12	Feb 2004	1/1.8" 5 MP 2592×1944	640×480 30 / 16fps	38-114mm f/2.8-5.2	3×	No	2.5" 123,000	Memory Stick / Pro	2× AA	91×60×36	250g	Yes
DSC-W5 / W15	Feb 2005	1/1.8" 5 MP 2592×1944	640×480 30 / 16fps	38-114mm f/2.8-5.2	3×	No	2.5" 123,000	Memory Stick / Pro	2× AA	91×60×36	250g	Yes
DSC-W7 / W17	Feb 2005	1/1.8 7.2 MP 3072×2304	640×480 30 / 16fps	38-114mm f/2.8-5.2	3×	No	2.5" 123,000	Memory Stick / Pro	2× AA	91×60×37	253g	Yes
DSC-W30 / W40	Feb 2006	1/2.5" 6 MP 2816×2112	640×480 30 / 16fps	38-114mm f/2.8-5.2	3×	No	2,5" 85,000	Memory Stick / Pro	NP-BG1	89×59×23	123g (no batteries)	No
DSC-W50	Feb 2006	1/2.5" 6 MP 2816×2112	640×480 30 / 16fps	38-114mm f/2.8-5.2	3×	No	2.5" 115,000	Memory Stick / Pro	NP-BG1	89×57×23	127g (no batteries)	No
DSC-W70	Feb 2006	1/2.5" 7.2 MP 3072×2304	640×480 30 / 16fps	38-114mm f/2.8-5.2	3×	No	2.5" 115,000	Memory Stick / Pro	NP-BG1	89×57×23	127g (no batteries)	No
DSC-W100	Feb 2006	1/1.8" 8.1 MP 3264×2448	640×480 30 / 16fps	38-114mm f/2.8-5.2	3×	No	2.5" 115,000	Memory Stick / Pro	NP-BG1	94.2×60.6×24.8	161g (no batteries)	Yes
DSC-W35	Feb 2007	1/2.5" 7.2 MP 3072×2304	640×480 30 / 16fps	38-114mm f/2.8-5.2	3×	No	2" 85,000	Memory Stick Pro DUO	NP-BG1	90×59×23	149g	No
DSC-W55	Feb 2007	1/2.5" 7.2 MP 3072×2304	640×480 30 / 16fps	38-114mm f/2.8-5.2	3×	No	2.5" 115,000	Memory Stick Pro DUO	NP-BG1	89×57×23	147g	No
DSC-W80	Feb 2007	1/2.5" 7.2 MP 3072×2304	640×480 30 / 16fps	35-105mm f/2.8-5.2	3×	Yes	2.5" 115,000	Memory Stick Pro DUO	NP-BG1	91×58×22.9	124g (no batteries)	No
DSC-W90	Feb 2007	1/2.5" 8.1 MP 3264×2448	640×480 30 / 16fps	35-105mm f/2.8-5.2	3×	Yes	2.5" 115,000	Memory Stick Pro DUO	NP-BG1	91×58×22.9	124g (no batteries)	No
DSC-W200	Feb 2007	1/1.7" 12.1 MP 4000×3000	640×480 30 / 16fps	35-105mm f/2.8-5.5	3×	Yes	2.5" 115,000	Memory Stick Pro DUO	NP-BG1	91×58.5×27.3	142g (no batteries)	Yes
DSC-W110 / W115 / W120	Jan 2008	1/2.5" 7.2 MP 3072×2304	640×480 30 / 16fps	32-128mm f/2.8-5.8	4×	Yes	2.5" 115,000	Memory Stick Pro DUO	NP-BG1	88.2×57.2×22.9	123g (no batteries)	No
DSC-W130	Jan 2008	1/2.5" 8.1 MP 3264×2448	640×480 30 / 16fps	32-128mm f/2.8-5.8	4×	Yes	2.5" 115,000	Memory Stick Pro DUO	NP-BG1	88.2×57.2×22.9	123g (no batteries)	No
DSC-W150	Jan 2008	1/2.5" 8.1 MP 3264×2448	640×480 30 / 16fps	30-150mm f/3.3-5.2	5×	Yes	2.7" 230,000	Memory Stick Pro DUO	NP-BG1	93.7×58×24	142g (no batteries)	No
DSC-W170	Jan 2008	1/2.3" 10.1 MP 3648×2736	640×480 30 / 16fps	28-140mm f/3.3-5.2	5×	Yes	2.7" 230,000	Memory Stick Pro DUO	NP-BG1	93.7×58×24	142g (no batteries)	No
DSC-W300	Jan 2008	1/1.7" 13.6 MP 4224×3168	640×480 30 / 16fps	35-105mm f/2.8-5.5	3×	Yes	2.7" 230,000	Memory Stick Pro DUO	NP-BG1	94.3×59×26.8	187g	Yes
DSC-W180	May 2009	1/2.3" 10.1 MP 3648×2736	320×240 30fps	35-105mm f/3.1-5.6	3×	No	2.7" 230,000	Memory Stick Pro DUO	NP-BK1	91×55×19	140g	No
DSC-W190	May 2009	1/2.3" 12.1 MP 4000×3000	320×240 30fps	35-105mm f/3.1-5.6	3×	No	2.7" 230,000	Memory Stick Pro DUO	NP-BK1	91×55×19	140g	No
DSC-W220 / W230	May 2009	1/2.3" 12.1 MP 4000×3000	640×480 30fps	30-120mm f/2.8-5.8	4×	Yes	3" 230,000	Memory Stick Pro DUO	NP-BG1	95×57×22	127g (no batteries)	No
DSC-W270	May 2009	1/2.3" 12.1 MP 4000×3000	720p 30fps	28-140mm f/3.3-5.2	5×	Yes	2.7" 230,000	Memory Stick Pro DUO	NP-BG1	98×57×23	145g (no batteries)	No
DSC-W290	May 2009	1/2.3" 12.1 MP 4000×3000	720p 30fps	28-140mm f/3.3-5.2	5×	Yes	3" 230,000	Memory Stick Pro DUO	NP-BG1			No
DSC-W310	Jan 2010	1/2.3" 12.1 MP 4000×3000	640×480 30fps	28-112mm f/3-5.8	4×	No	2.7" 230,000	SD / SDHC / SDXC / Memory Stick DUO	NP-BN1	95×55×19	137g	No
DSC-W320	Jan 2010	1/2.3" 14 MP 4320×3240	640×480 30fps	26-105mm f/2.7-5.7	4×	No	2.7" 230,000	SD / SDHC / SDXC / Memory Stick DUO	NP-BN1	93×52×17	117g	No
DSC-W330	Jan 2010	1/2.3" 14 MP 4320×3240	640×480 30fps	26-105mm f/2.7-5.7	4×	No	3" 230,000	SD / SDHC / SDXC / Memory Stick DUO	NP-BN1	96×57×17	128g	No
DSC-W350	Jan 2010	1/2.3" 14 MP 4320×3240	720p 30fps with optical zoom	26-105mm f/2.7-5.7	4×	Yes	2.7" 230,000	SD / SDHC / SDXC / Memory Stick DUO	NP-BN1	91×52×17	117g	No
DSC-W360	Jan 2010	1/2.3" 14 MP 4320×3240	720p 30fps with optical zoom	26-105mm f/2.7-5.7	4×	Yes	3" 230,000	SD / SDHC / SDXC / Memory Stick DUO	NP-BN1	94×55.9×17.8	109g (no batteries)	No
DSC-W370	Jan 2010	1/2.3" 14 MP 4320×3240	720p 30fps with optical zoom	34-238mm f/3.6-7.1	7×	Yes	3" 230,000	SD / SDHC / SDXC / Memory Stick DUO	NP-BN1	99.1×55.9×25.4	158.8g	No
DSC-W380	Jan 2010	1/2.3" 14 MP 4320×3240	720p 30fps with optical zoom	24-120mm f/2.4-5.9	5×	Yes	2.7" 230,000	SD / SDHC / SDXC / Memory Stick DUO	NP-BN1	91.7×51.9×19.	108g (no batteries)	No
DSC-W390	Jan 2010	1/2.3" 14 MP 4320×3240	720p 30fps with optical zoom	24-120mm f/2.4-5.9	5×	Yes	3" 230,000	SD / SDHC / SDXC / Memory Stick DUO	NP-BN1	94×55.9×20.3	117g (no batteries)	No
DSC-W510	Jan 2011	1/2.3" 12 MP 4000×3000	640×480 30fps	26 -104mm f/2.8-5.9	4×	No	2.7" 230,000	SD / SDHC / SDXC / Memory Stick DUO	NP-BN1	96×54×20	119g	No
DSC-W520	Jan 2011	1/2.3" 14 MP 4320×3240	640×480 30fps	25-125mm f/3.3-5.8	5×	No	2.7" 230,000	SD / SDHC / SDXC / Memory Stick DUO	NP-BN1	96.5×55.9× 20.3	108g	No
DSC-W530	Jan 2011	1/2.3" 14 MP 4320×3240	640×480 30fps	26 -104mm f/2.7-5.7	4×	No	2.7" 230,000	SD / SDHC / SDXC / Memory Stick DUO	NP-BN1	93×53×19	113g	No
DSC-W550	Jan 2011	1/2.3" 14 MP 4320×3240	640×480 30fps	26 -104mm f/2.7-5.7	4×	No	3" 230,000	SD / SDHC / SDXC / Memory Stick DUO	NP-BN1	94×56×19	110g	No
DSC-W560	Jan 2011	1/2.3" 14 MP 4320×3240	720p 30fps with optical zoom	26 -104mm f/2.7-5.7	4×	Yes	3" 230,000	SD / SDHC / SDXC / Memory Stick DUO	NP-BN1	94×56×19	110g	No
DSC-W570	Jan 2011	1/2.3" 16 MP 4608×3456	720p 30fps with optical zoom	25-125mm f/2.6-5.3	5×	Yes	2.7" 230,000	SD / SDHC / SDXC / Memory Stick DUO	NP-BN1	91×52×19	116g	No
DSC-W580	Jan 2011	1/2.3" 16 MP 4608×3456	720p 30fps with optical zoom	25-125mm f/2.6-5.3	5×	Yes	3" 230,000	SD / SDHC / SDXC / Memory Stick DUO	NP-BN1	94×56×19.1	127g	No
DSC-W610	Jan 2012	1/2.3" 14 MP 4320×3240	640×480 30fps	26 -104mm f/2.8-5.9	4×	No	2.7" 230,000	SD / SDHC / SDXC / Memory Stick DUO	NP-BN1	93×52×19	113g	No
DSC-W620	Jan 2012	1/2.3" 14 MP 4320×3240	720p 30fps with optical zoom	28-140mm f/3.2-6.5	5×	No	2.7" 230,000	SD / SDHC / SDXC / Memory Stick DUO	NP-BN1	98×56×20	116g	No
DSC-W630	Jan 2012	1/2.3" 16 MP 4608×3456	720p 30fps with optical zoom	28-140mm f/2.6-6.3	5×	Yes	2.7" 230,000	SD / SDHC / SDXC / Memory Stick DUO	NP-BN1	91×52.2×19.1	100g	No
DSC-W650	Jan 2012	1/2.3" 16 MP 4608×3456	720p 30fps with optical zoom	25-125mm f/2.6-6.3	5×	Yes	3" 230,000	SD / SDHC / SDXC / Memory Stick DUO	NP-BN1	94×56×19	124g	No
DSC-W670	Jan 2012	1/2.3" 16 MP 4608×3456	720p 30fps with optical zoom	28-168mm f/3.5-6.5	6×	Yes	2.7" 230,000	SD / SDHC / SDXC / Memory Stick DUO	NP-BN1	97.6×58.1×20.4	125g	No
DSC-W690	Jan 2012	1/2.3" 16 MP 4608×3456	720p 30fps with optical zoom	25-250mm f/3.3-5.9	10×	Yes	3" 230,000	SD / SDHC / SDXC / Memory Stick DUO	NP-BN1	94×56×22	142g	No
DSC-W710	Jan 2013	1/2.3" 16 MP 4608×3456	720p 30fps with optical zoom	28-140mm f/3.2-6.5	5×	Yes	2.7" 230,000	SD / SDHC / SDXC / Memory Stick DUO	NP-BN1	97×55×20	114g	No
DSC-W730	Jan 2013	1/2.3" 16 MP 4608×3456	720p 30fps with optical zoom	25-224mm f/3.3-6.3	9×	Yes	2.7" 230,000	SD / SDHC / SDXC / Memory Stick DUO	NP-BN1	93×52×22	122g	No
DSC-W810	Jan 2014	1/2.3" 20 MP 5152×3864	720p 30fps with optical zoom	26-156mm f/3.5-6.5	6×	Yes	2.7" 230,000	SD / SDHC / SDXC / Memory Stick DUO	NP-BN1	97×56×21	111g	No
DSC-W830	Jan 2014	1/2.3" 20 MP 5152×3864	720p 30fps with optical zoom	25-200mm f/3.3-6.3	8×	Yes	2.7" 230,000	SD / SDHC / SDXC / Memory Stick DUO	NP-BN1	93×52×23	122g	No
DSC-W800	Feb 2014	1/2.3" 20 MP 5152×3864	720p 30fps with optical zoom	26 -130mm f/3.2-6.4	5×	Yes	2.7" 230,000	SD / SDHC / SDXC / Memory Stick DUO	NP-BN1	90×22×54	125g	No

== WX Series ==
Cameras using a CMOS Sensor, designed for faster auto-focus and low light capability. All cameras have optical image stabilization and can zoom optically while filming.

- DSC-WX1 (2009, 10.2 MP, no Manual mode, 5× optical zoom, G Lens, Sweep Panorama, HD Movie 720p)
- DSC-WX5 (2010, 12.2 MP, 5× optical zoom, G Lens, 3D Sweep Panorama, HD Movie 1080i, 2.8˝ LCD)
- DSC-WX7 (2011, 16.2 MP, 5× zoom, 3D Sweep Panorama, Full HD Movie 1080/60i 2.3˝ LCD)
- DSC-WX9 (2011, 16.2 MP, 5× optical zoom, 3D Sweep Panorama, Full HD 1080/60i video, 3.0˝ LCD)
- DSC-WX10 (2011, 16.2 MP, 7× optical zoom, G Lens, 3D Sweep Panorama, HD Movie 1080i, 2.8˝ LCD)
- DSC-WX30 (2011, 16.2 MP, 5× optical zoom, 3D Sweep Panorama, HD Movie 1080p, 3.0˝ LCD)
- DSC-WX50 (2012, 16.2 MP, 5× optical zoom, 3D Sweep Panorama, HD Movie 1080p, 2.6˝ LCD)
- DSC-WX60 (2013, 16.2 MP, 8× optical zoom, Zeiss Lens, 3D Sweep Panorama, HD Movie 1080i, 2.7˝ LCD)
- DSC-WX70 (2012, 16.2 MP, 5× optical zoom, 3D Sweep Panorama, HD Movie 1080p, 3.0˝ LCD)
- DSC-WX80 (2013, Wi-Fi, 16.2 MP, 8× optical zoom, Zeiss Lens, 3D Sweep Panorama, HD Movie 1080i, 2.7˝ LCD)
- DSC-WX100 (2012, 18.2 MP, 10× optical zoom, G Lens, 3D Sweep Panorama, HD Movie 1080i, 2.7˝ LCD)
- DSC-WX150 (2012, 18.2 MP, 10× optical zoom, G Lens, 3D Sweep Panorama, HD Movie 1080i, 3.0˝ LCD)
- DSC-WX170 (2012, 18.2 MP, 10× optical zoom, G Lens, 3D Sweep Panorama, HD Movie 1080i, 3.0˝ LCD)
- DSC-WX200 (2013, Wi-Fi, 18.2 MP, 10× optical zoom, G Lens, 3D Sweep Panorama, HD Movie 1080i, 3.0˝ LCD)
- DSC-WX220 (2014, Wi-Fi, NFC, 18.2 MP, 10× optical zoom, G Lens, Exmor R CMOS Sensor, HD Movie 1080i with AVCHD, available to connect to 4K TV, 2.7˝ LCD)
- DSC-WX300 (2013, Wi-Fi, 18.2 MP, 20× optical zoom, G Lens, 3D Sweep Panorama, HD Movie 1080i, 3.0˝ LCD)
- DSC-WX350 (2014, Wi-Fi, NFC, Remote control with smartphone, 18.2 MP, 20× optical zoom, G Lens, Exmor R CMOS Sensor, HD Movie 1080i with AVCHD, available to connect to 4K TV, 3.0˝ LCD)
- DSC-WX500 (2015, 18.2 MP, 30× optical zoom, 180° Tilt LCD)
- DSC-WX800 (2018, 18.2 MP, 30× optical zoom, 180° Tilt LCD, 4K video, Eye-AF)

Model	Release date	Sensor specifications	Video specifications	Lens (35mm equivalent) and aperture	Optical zoom	LCD Specifications	Card	Battery	Dimensions WxHxD (mm)	Weight (include batteries)	Manual Exposure
DSC-WX1	Aug 2009	1/2.4" 10 MP 3648×2736	720p 30fps	24-120mm f/2.4-5.9	5×	2.8" 230,000	Memory Stick DUO	NP-BG1	91×52×20	149g	No
DSC-WX5	Jul 2010	1/2.3" 12 MP 4000×3000	1080i 60 / 50	24-120mm f/2.4-5.9	5×	3" 230,000	SD / SDHC / SDXC / Memory Stick DUO	NP-BN1	92×52×22	130g (no batteries)	No
DSC-WX7	Jan 2011	1/2.3" 16 MP 4608×3456	1080i 60 / 50	25 -125mm f/2.6-6.3	5×	2.8" 460,000	SD / SDHC / SDXC / Memory Stick DUO	NP-BN1	92.2×51.9×19.1	120g (no batteries)	No
DSC-WX9	Jan 2011	1/2.3" 16 MP 4608×3456	1080i 60 / 50	25 -125mm f/2.6-6.3	5×	3" 921,000	SD / SDHC / SDXC / Memory Stick DUO	NP-BN1	95×56×20	123g (no batteries)	No
DSC-WX10	Jan 2011	1/2.3" 16 MP 4608×3456	1080i 60 / 50	24-168mm f/2.4-5.9	7×	2.8" 460,000	SD / SDHC / SDXC / Memory Stick DUO	NP-BG1	95×54×23	161g	Yes
DSC-WX30	Jul 2011	1/2.3" 16 MP 4608×3456	1080i 60 / 50	25 -125mm f/2.6-6.3	5×	3" touch 921,000	SD / SDHC / SDXC / Memory Stick DUO	NP-BN1	92×52×19	117g	No
DSC-WX50	Jan 2012	1/2.3" 16 MP 4608×3456	1080i 60 / 50	25 -125mm f/2.6-6.3	5×	2.8" 460,000	SD / SDHC / SDXC / Memory Stick DUO	NP-BN1	92×52×19	117g	No
DSC-WX70	Jan 2012	1/2.3" 16 MP 4608×3456	1080i 60 / 50	25 -125mm f/2.6-6.3	5×	3" touch 921,000	SD / SDHC / SDXC / Memory Stick DUO	NP-BN1	92×52×19	114g	No
DSC-WX100	Feb 2012	1/2.3" 18 MP 4896×3672	1080i 60 / 50	25-250mm f/3.3-5.9	10×	2.8" 460,000	SD / SDHC / SDXC / Memory Stick DUO	NP-BN1	92.3×52.4×21.6	124g	No
DSC-WX150	Feb 2012	1/2.3" 18 MP 4896×3672	1080i 60 / 50	25-250mm f/3.3-5.9	10×	3" 460,000	SD / SDHC / SDXC / Memory Stick DUO	NP-BN1	95×56×22	133g	No
DSC-WX170	Feb 2012	1/2.3" 18 MP 4896×3672	1080i 60 / 50	27.5-275mm f/3.3-5.9	10×	3" touch 921,000	SD / SDHC / SDXC / Memory Stick DUO	NP-BN1	92.3×52.4×21.6	103g (no batteries)	No
DSC-WX60 / WX80	Feb 2013	1/2.3" 16 MP 4608×3456	1080i 60 / 50	25-200mm f/3.3-6.3	8×	2.8" 230,000	SD / SDHC / SDXC / Memory Stick DUO	NP-BN1	92.3×52.5×22.5	124g	No
DSC-WX200	Feb 2013	1/2.3" 18 MP 4896×3672	1080i 60 / 50	25-250mm f/3.3-5.9	10×	2.8" 460,000	SD / SDHC / SDXC / Memory Stick DUO	NP-BN1	92.3×52.4×21.6	121g	No
DSC-WX300	Feb 2013	1/2.3" 18 MP 4896×3672	1080i 60 / 50	25-500mm f/3.5-6.5	20×	3" 460,000	SD / SDHC / SDXC / Memory Stick DUO	NP-BX1	96×55×25	166g	No
DSC-WX220	Feb 2014	1/2.3" 18 MP 4896×3672	1080p 60fps / 50fps	25-250mm f/3.3-5.9	10×	2.8" 460,000	SD / SDHC / SDXC / Memory Stick DUO	NP-BN1	92.3×52.4×21.6	121g	No
DSC-WX350	Feb 2014	1/2.3" 18 MP 4896×3672	1080p 60fps / 50fps	25-500mm f/3.5-6.5	20×	3" 460,000	SD / SDHC / SDXC / Memory Stick DUO	NP-BX1	96×55×26	137g	No
DSC-WX500	April 2015	1/2.3" 18 MP 4896×3672	1080p 60fps / 50fps	24-720mm f/3.5-6.4	30×	3" tilting 921,000	SD / SDHC / SDXC / Memory Stick DUO	NP-BX1	102×58×36	236g	Yes
DSC-WX800	October 2018	1/2.3" 18 MP 4896×3672	4K 30fps 1080p 120fps	24-720mm f/3.5-6.4	30×	3" tilting touch 921,000	micro SD / Memory Stick micro	NP-BX1	101.6×58.1×35.5	233g	Yes

=== 3D cameras ===
On July 7, 2010, Sony unveiled the Sony DSC-TX9 and DSC-WX5, which were the world's smallest 3D cameras and capture 3D images with a single lens system using a sweeping motion. Sony also introduced the DSC-T99 14.1 MP CCD camera for about $250. The three cameras above offered a 3D Sweep Panorama feature, which let one take panoramic pictures in a single press-and-sweep motion. The high-speed burst of frames is digitally stitched together to automatically create a detail-packed 3D panorama. These images can be viewed in 2D or 3D on compatible 3D televisions.

== Sony Ericsson mobile phones ==
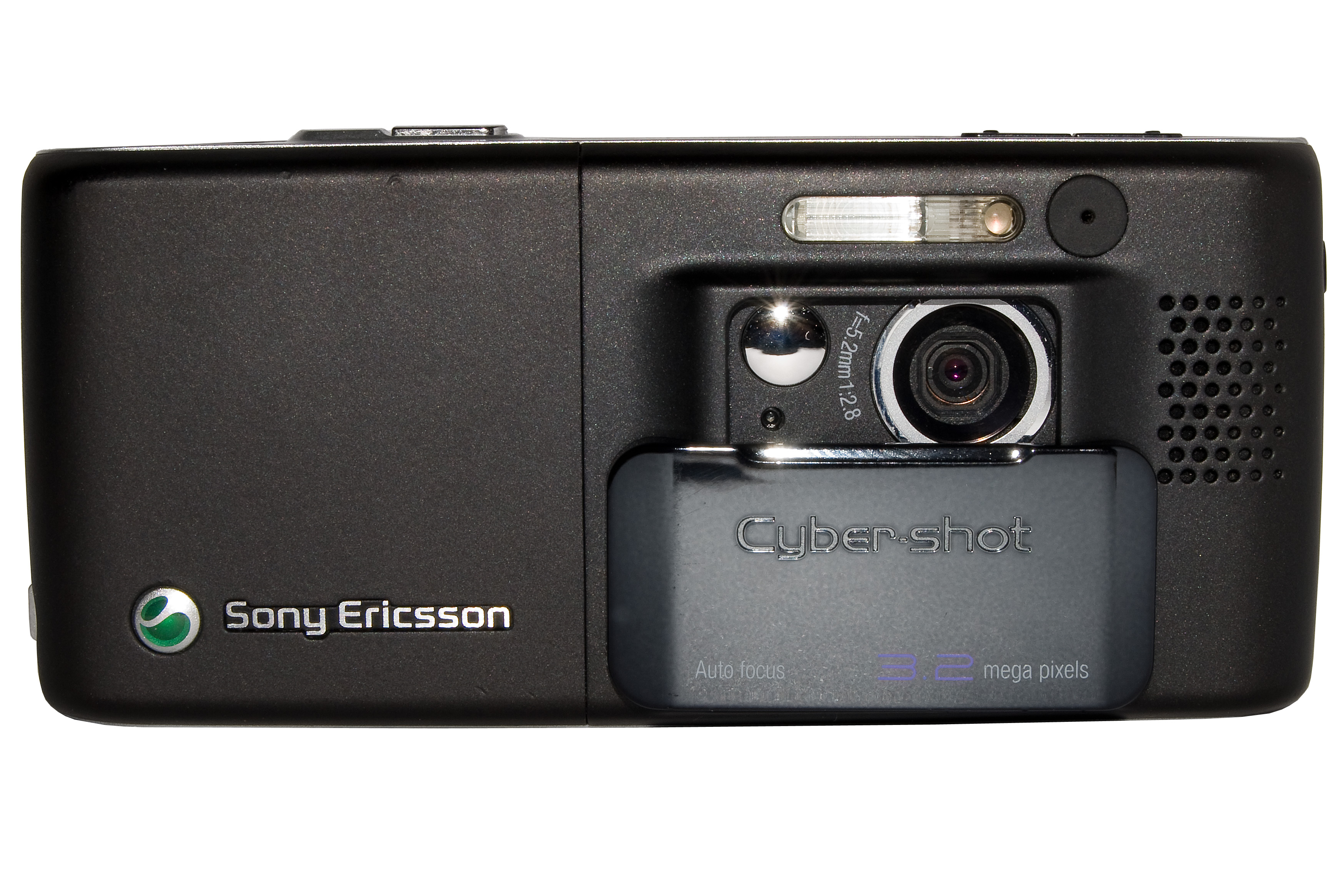
Sony Ericsson K800i (2006)

In 2006, the now-defunct Sony Mobile (then known as Sony Ericsson Mobile Communications, a joint venture between Sony and Ericsson) launched a mobile phone using the Cyber-shot branding for the Sony Ericsson K800i, featuring a 3.2-MP Cyber-shot digital camera and a xenon flash.

On February 6, 2007, Sony Ericsson announced the K810 Cyber-shot phone. Building on the success of the K800, the K810 added a number of features that made its 3.2-MP autofocus camera even more camera-like. Sony Ericsson also expanded its Cyber-shot branding to a mid-range handset, the K550, which had a 2.0-MP camera bundled with autofocus and LED flash.

Sony Ericsson announced its flagship K850 on June 14, 2007, and its Candy-bar K770 on February 3, 2008.

In Japan, Sony Ericsson used the Cyber-shot name on the SO905iCS, 'CS' standing for Cyber-shot. The handset featured an Exmor CMOS sensor, as well as a smile shutter, BRAVIA Screen and a 3× optical zoom mechanism.

As a successor to the popular K Series, Sony Ericsson introduced the 'C' Series in 2008. The initial handset released under this category was the 5-MP C902, with the C905 announced shortly thereafter. The C905 signalled Sony Ericsson's entry into the 8-MP camera phone market. The last Cyber-shot phone to be released in Japan was the Sony Ericsson S006 in October 2010.

All Cyber-shot phones featured the following:

(Features marked with an asterisk (*) are not included with every model, but belong to high-end releases (As of 13 January 2009))

- A camera look-alike overall design
- Digital zoom
- Auto focus
- Flash (xenon or LED) with red-eye reduction
- Image stabiliser*
- Photo Fix (for a quick correction of photos)
- PhotoDJ (for enhancing photos)
- BestPic (Sony Ericsson's brand name for burst mode)*
- Photo blogging
- Video player
- Video recording
- Video stabilizer*
- Video streaming*

After Sony's mobile division ceased to be a joint venture in 2012, all production of new Cyber-shot phones have currently stopped.
