= Sony Cyber-shot DSC-WX500 =

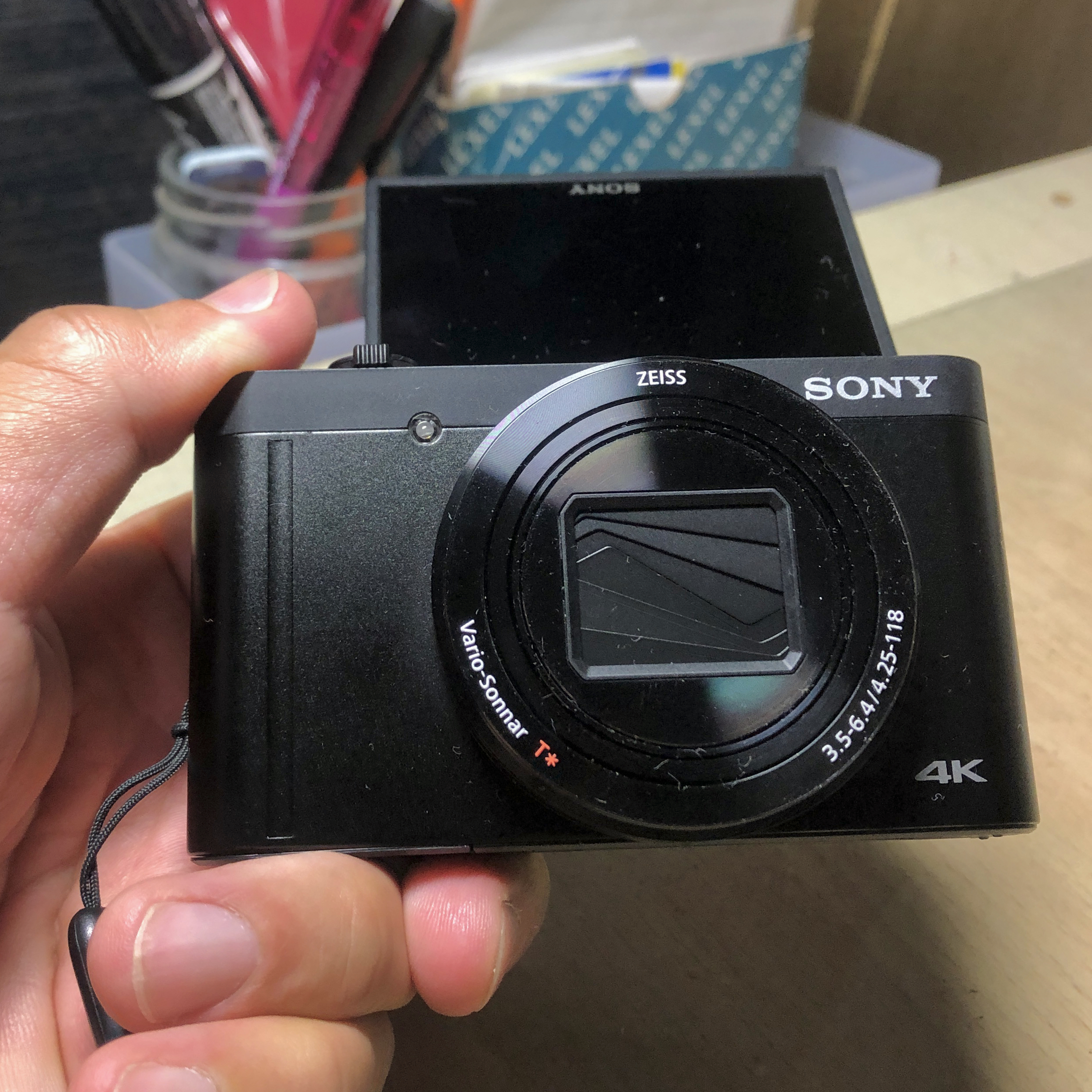

Overview
- Maker: Sony
- Type: Digital Selfie Compact Camera
- Released: April 2015

Lens
- Lens: Zeiss Vario-Sonnar T* 30x Zoom Lens, 24-720mm equivalent
- F-numbers: F3.5 (W) - 6.4 (T) (Maximum Aperture)

Sensor/medium
- Sensor: 1/2.3 type Exmor R CMOS sensor
- Sensor size: 7.82mm
- Maximum resolution: 18.2MP
- Film format: XAVC S, AVCHD format Ver.2.0 compatible, MP4

Flash
- Flash: Built-In

Shutter
- Frame rate: 10 fps (for up to 10 shots)

Viewfinder
- Viewfinder: 0.2-type electronic viewfinder
- Viewfinder magnification: 0.5

Image processing
- Image processor: Bionz X
- White balance: Yes
- WB bracketing: Yes

General
- LCD screen: TFT with 921,600 dots
- Battery: Rechargeable Battery Pack NP-BX1
- Dimensions: 101.6×58.1×35.5 mm (4.00×2.29×1.40 in)
- Weight: 209 g (7 oz) (Body only), 236 g (With battery and media)

Chronology
- Predecessor: DSC-HX50V
- Successor: DSC-WX300

The Sony Cyber-shot DSC-WX500 is a digital selfie compact camera, which can zoom up to 30x; equivalent to 24–720 mm. Its TFT LCD screen can tilt up to 180º, it has a built-in flash and a built-in AF illuminator (Assist lamp). It also has an Exmor R CMOS sensor and a BIONZ X image processing engine. Its customizable ring is borrowed from the Sony Cyber-shot DSC-RX100, around the front of the lens. The camera also has built-in Wi-Fi with NFC with downloadable apps, but no GPS. The WX500 features Optical Image Stabilisation.

Its sibling is the Sony Cyber-shot DSC-HX90V. Its predecessor is the DSC-HX50V, and consumer oriented predecessors DSC-WX300 and WX350.

== See also ==
- List of superzoom compact cameras
