= Sony Cyber-shot DSC-HX90V =

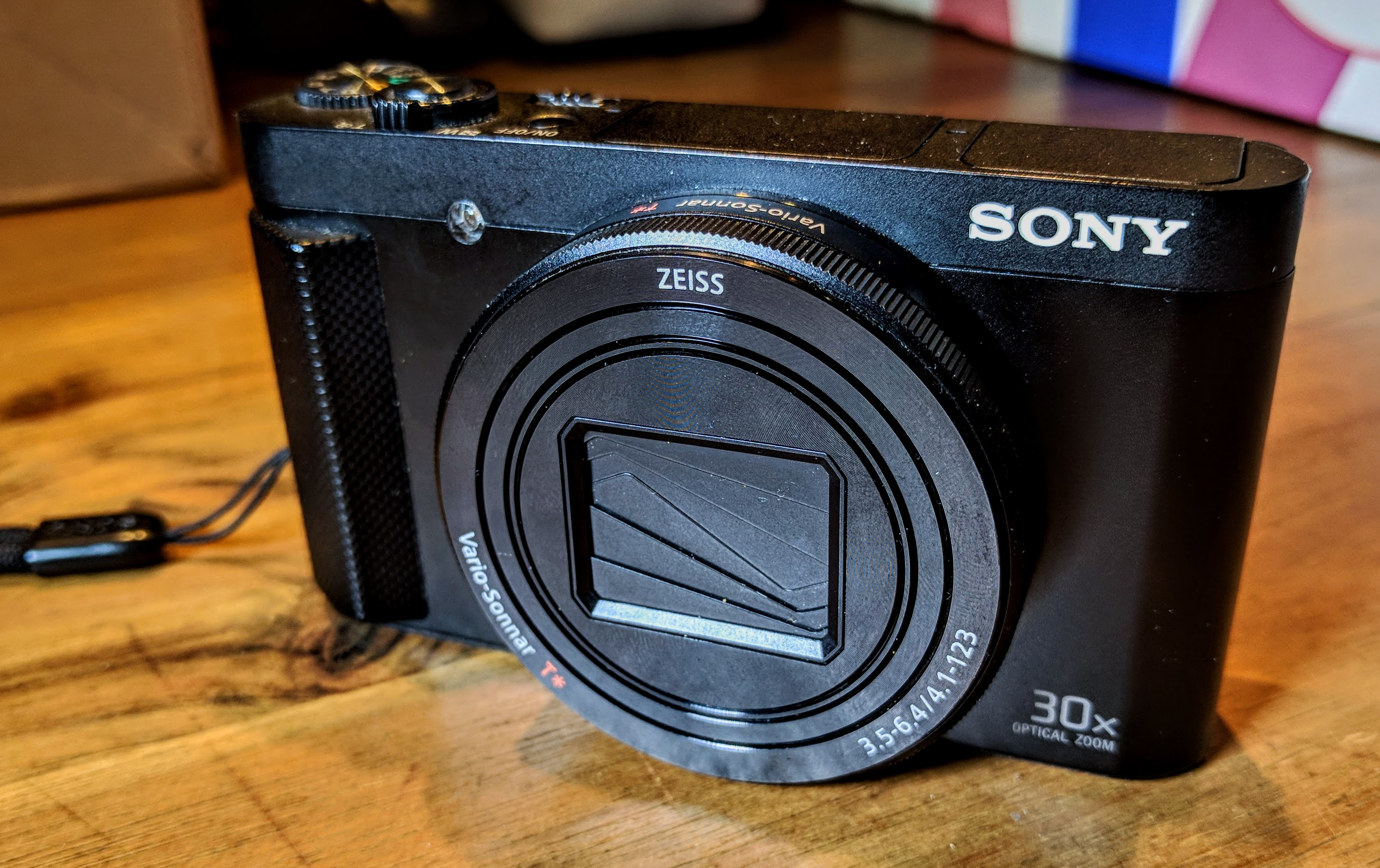
- Sony Cyber-shot DSC-HX90V

Overview
- Maker: Sony
- Type: Digital Zoom Compact Camera
- Released: June 2015

Lens
- Lens mount: N/A
- Lens: 24-720mm equivalent
- F-numbers: f/3.5 – f/6.4 at the widest

Sensor/medium
- Sensor type: BSI-CMOS
- Sensor size: 6.17 x 4.55mm (1/2.3 inch type)
- Maximum resolution: 4896 x 3672 (18.2 megapixels)
- Film speed: 80-3200 (Expendable to 12800 with Multi Frame NR)
- Recording medium: SD, SDHC or SDXC memory card or Memory Stick Duo

Flash
- Flash: Built-In

Shutter
- Frame rate: 50p
- Shutter speeds: 1/2000s to 30s
- Continuous shooting: 10 frames per second

Viewfinder
- Optional viewfinders: TFT with 638,400 dots
- Viewfinder magnification: 0.5
- Frame coverage: 100%

Image processing
- Image processor: Bionz X
- White balance: Yes
- WB bracketing: Yes

Projector
- Image size: 638,400 pixels

General
- LCD screen: 3 inches with 921,000 dots
- Battery: Rechargeable Battery Pack NP-BX1
- Dimensions: 102 × 58 × 36mm (4.02 × 2.28 ×1.42 inches)
- Weight: 218 g (8 oz) (Body only), 245 g (With battery and media)

The Sony Cyber-shot DSC-HX90V is a superzoom compact camera, which can zoom up to 30x; equivalent to 24-720mm. At the time of its release, it was the world's smallest superzoom digital camera (along with its sibling, the WX500). It features optical image stabilization, an AF Illuminator, an 18.2MP BSI Active pixel sensor and has customizable settings. The camera has a pop-up OLED electronic viewfinder that has 638,400 dots and is far brighter than any other conventional electronic viewfinders. The camera's screen is a 3" TFT LCD (921,000 dots) that tilts upward 180 degrees. Also borrowed from the RX100 is a customizable ring around the front of the lens. The HX90V can record video at 1080/60p using the XAVC S codec, which allows for bit rates up to 50 Mbit/s. The camera has a built-in GPS; used for geotagging. The camera also has built-in Wi-Fi with NFC and Bluetooth, which means you can connect your camera to your phone or tablet by using PlayMemories Camera Apps.

== See also ==
- List of superzoom compact cameras
