= List of superzoom compact cameras =

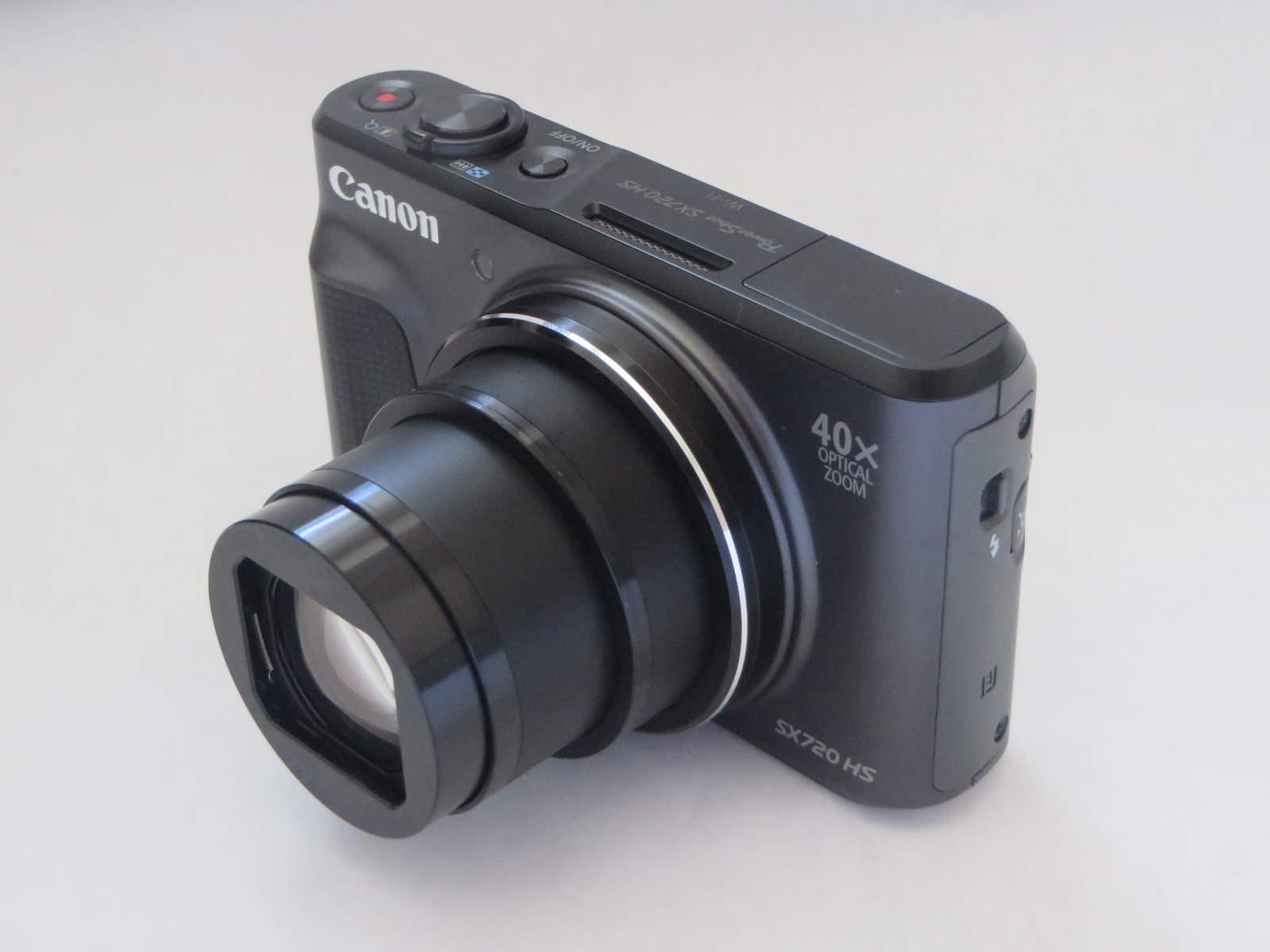
Canon PowerShot SX720 HS

This is a list of superzoom compact cameras, also known as travel zoom cameras. These are small fixed-lens "point-and-shoot" digital cameras that have a high optical zoom ratio.

These cameras all include a power zoom lens that retracts into the body when not in use, along with an automatic lens cover or lens cap. Models that include an electronic viewfinder (EVF) have it offset to the side in the style of a rangefinder camera. Their pocketable form factor differentiates them from bulkier DSLR-style bridge cameras.

It is exceedingly difficult to construct a compact lens with such high zoom ratios, which means that the longest zoom lenses may not be the sharpest. For example, the Sony RX100 VII (8×) is sharper than the Panasonic ZS200 (15×), and the Sony HX99 (30×) is sharper than the Canon SX740 (40×).

== Large sensor compact cameras with at least 8× zoom ==
Each of the following models contains a 1.0-type ("1-inch") image sensor with a crop factor of 2.7.

Model	Sensor size	Optical zoom	Focal length (Note: 35mm equivalent.)		Aperture		Pixel count	Weight	EVF	Release year	Availability
Model	Sensor size	Optical zoom	Wide	Tele	Wide	Tele	Pixel count	Weight	EVF	Release year	Availability
Leica C-Lux	1.0-type	15×	24mm	360mm	f/3.3	f/6.4	20 MP	340g	Yes	2018	Discontinued
Panasonic ZS300	1.0-type	15×	24mm	360mm	f/3.3	f/6.4	20 MP	337g	No	2026	Current
Panasonic ZS200 (Note: Known as the TZ200, TZ202, TZ220, ZS220, or TX2 outside of North America.)	1.0-type	15×	24mm	360mm	f/3.3	f/6.4	20 MP	340g	Yes	2018	Discontinued
Panasonic ZS100 (Note: Known as the TZ100, TZ101, TZ110, ZS110, or TX1 outside of North America.)	1.0-type	10×	25mm	250mm	f/2.8	f/5.9	20 MP	310g	Yes	2016	Discontinued
Sony RX100 VII	1.0-type	8×	24mm	200mm	f/2.8	f/4.5	20 MP	302g	Yes	2019	Current
Sony RX100 VI	1.0-type	8×	24mm	200mm	f/2.8	f/4.5	20 MP	301g	Yes	2018	Discontinued

== Superzoom compact cameras with constant aperture ==
Model	Sensor size	Optical zoom	Focal length		Aperture		Pixel count	Weight	EVF	Release year	Availability
Model	Sensor size	Optical zoom	Wide	Tele	Wide	Tele	Pixel count	Weight	EVF	Release year	Availability
Casio EX-100	1/1.7-type	11×	28mm	300mm	f/2.8		12 MP	389g	No	2014	Discontinued

The Olympus Stylus 1 is essentially the same camera as the Casio EX-100 except in a DSLR-style body with an EVF, which makes the Stylus 1 a bridge camera.

== Small sensor compact cameras with at least 30× zoom ==
There are far too many small sensor compact cameras with less than 30× zoom to list here. Each of the following models contains a 1/2.3-type ("1/2.3-inch") image sensor with a crop factor of 5.6.

Model	Sensor size	Optical zoom	Focal length		Aperture		Pixel count	Weight	EVF	Release year	Availability
Model	Sensor size	Optical zoom	Wide	Tele	Wide	Tele	Pixel count	Weight	EVF	Release year	Availability
Canon SX740	1/2.3-type	40×	24mm	960mm	f/3.3	f/6.9	20 MP	299g	No	2018	Discontinued
Canon SX730	1/2.3-type	40×	24mm	960mm	f/3.3	f/6.9	20 MP	300g	No	2017	Discontinued
Canon SX720	1/2.3-type	40×	24mm	960mm	f/3.3	f/6.9	20 MP	270g	No	2016	Discontinued
Canon SX710	1/2.3-type	30×	25mm	750mm	f/3.2	f/6.9	20 MP	269g	No	2015	Discontinued
Canon SX700	1/2.3-type	30×	25mm	750mm	f/3.2	f/6.9	16 MP	269g	No	2014	Discontinued
Nikon A1000	1/2.3-type	35×	24mm	840mm	f/3.4	f/6.9	16 MP	330g	Yes	2019	Discontinued
Nikon A900	1/2.3-type	35×	24mm	840mm	f/3.4	f/6.9	20 MP	298g	No	2016	Discontinued
Nikon S9900	1/2.3-type	30×	25mm	750mm	f/3.7	f/6.4	16 MP	289g	No	2015	Discontinued
Nikon S9700	1/2.3-type	30×	25mm	750mm	f/3.7	f/6.4	16 MP	232g	No	2014	Discontinued
Panasonic ZS99 (Note: Known as the TZ99 outside of North America.)	1/2.3-type	30×	24mm	720mm	f/3.3	f/6.4	20 MP	312g	No	2024	Current
Panasonic ZS80 (Note: Known as the TZ95 outside of North America.)	1/2.3-type	30×	24mm	720mm	f/3.3	f/6.4	20 MP	328g	Yes	2019	Discontinued
Panasonic ZS70 (Note: Known as the TZ90 outside of North America.)	1/2.3-type	30×	24mm	720mm	f/3.3	f/6.4	20 MP	322g	Yes	2017	Discontinued
Panasonic ZS60 (Note: Known as the TZ80 outside of North America.)	1/2.3-type	30×	24mm	720mm	f/3.3	f/6.4	18 MP	282g	Yes	2016	Discontinued
Panasonic ZS50 (Note: Known as the TZ70 outside of North America.)	1/2.3-type	30×	24mm	720mm	f/3.3	f/6.4	12 MP	243g	Yes	2015	Discontinued
Panasonic ZS40 (Note: Known as the TZ60 outside of North America.)	1/2.3-type	30×	24mm	720mm	f/3.3	f/6.4	18 MP	240g	Yes	2014	Discontinued
Sony HX99	1/2.3-type	30×	24mm	720mm	f/3.5	f/6.4	18 MP	242g	Yes	2018	Discontinued
Sony HX95	1/2.3-type	30×	24mm	720mm	f/3.5	f/6.4	18 MP	243g	Yes	2018	Discontinued
Sony HX90	1/2.3-type	30×	24mm	720mm	f/3.5	f/6.4	18 MP	245g	Yes	2015	Discontinued
Sony HX80	1/2.3-type	30×	24mm	720mm	f/3.5	f/6.4	18 MP	245g	Yes	2016	Discontinued
Sony HX60	1/2.3-type	30×	24mm	720mm	f/3.5	f/6.3	20 MP	272g	Opt. (Note: Optional accessory.)	2014	Discontinued
Sony HX50	1/2.3-type	30×	24mm	720mm	f/3.5	f/6.3	20 MP	272g	Opt.	2013	Discontinued
Sony WX800	1/2.3-type	30×	24mm	720mm	f/3.5	f/6.4	18 MP	233g	No	2018	Discontinued
Sony WX500	1/2.3-type	30×	24mm	720mm	f/3.5	f/6.4	18 MP	236g	No	2015	Discontinued

Unformatted Additions:

1. Olympus SZ-10, 18x zoom 5.0-90.0mm 1:3.1-4.4 14MP (info weirdly difficult to find online) [added on 14.09.2026 by gal with said camera]

== See also ==
- List of superzoom lenses
- List of longest smartphone telephoto lenses
- List of bridge cameras
- List of large sensor fixed-lens cameras
- Canon PowerShot SX
- Sony Cyber-shot
- Fujifilm FinePix
- Nikon Coolpix
- Panasonic Lumix
- Point-and-shoot camera
