= Sony Cyber-shot DSC-HX50 =

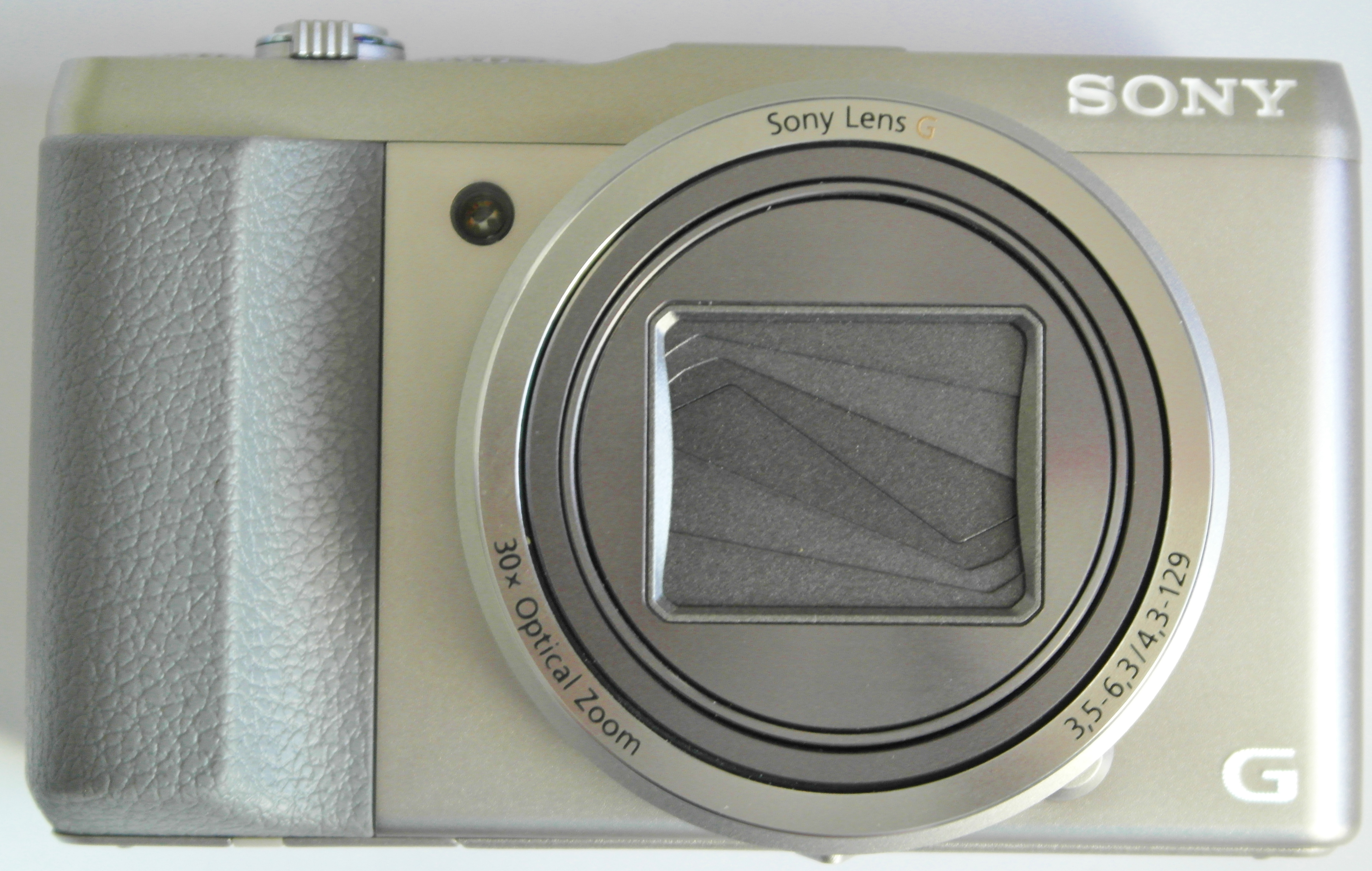

Overview
- Type: Digital still camera

Lens
- Lens: SONY G 24-720mm mm (30x optical zoom) F3.5 (W) - 6.3 (T)

Sensor/medium
- Sensor: Exmor R™ CMOS Sensor
- Maximum resolution: 5,184 X 3,888 (20,4 megapixels)
- Film speed: ISO 80 - 12800
- Storage media: SD, SDHC, SDXCMultiMediaCard, internal

Focusing
- Focus modes: Automatic
- Focus areas: 0,05m - 400m
- Focus bracketing: ±2.0 EV in ⅓ EV steps

Exposure/metering
- Exposure modes: Manual, Program, iAutomatic, Shutter Priority, Aperture Priority,
- Exposure metering: Multi; Center; Spot
- Metering modes: Intelligent Multiple / Center Weighted / Spot

Flash
- Flash: Built-in range: 5 meters (on ISO-12800), Auto / Flash On / Slow Synchro / Rear Slow Synchro / Flash Off / Advanced Flash, ISO Auto: Approx. 0.25m to 5.6m (0.82 ft. to 18.37 ft.) (W) / Approx. 2.0m to 3.0m (6.56 ft.. to 9.84 ft.) (T), ISO3200: up to Approx. 7.9m (25.91 ft.) (W) / Approx. 4.2m (13.78 ft.) (T)
- Flash bracketing: ±2.0 EV in ⅓ EV steps

Shutter
- Shutter speed range: 0,1 - 3,2 sec
- Continuous shooting: 10 frames per sec. (limited to 10 frames)

Viewfinder
- Viewfinder: 3.0 inch 921K dot LCD screen

Image processing
- White balance: Auto, Manual, Outdoors/Daylight, Cloudy, Incandescent, Fluorescent, FlashGroup, White Balance

General
- Battery: Lithium N NP-BX1 with 1240mAH, 3,6 V, 4,5Wh (Approx. 400 shots/ Approx. 200 min at the beginning 11 °C/ 51.8 °F)
- Weight: 272g (108.1mm x 63.6mm x 38.3mm)

The Sony Cyber-shot DSC-HX50 is a hyperzoom camera with 30x optical zoom, released in 2013.

== Features ==
- Wide-angle lens
- 20.4 megapixel resolution
- Optical image stabilizer in the lens, reducing blurring by compensating for hand shake—10 fps continuous shooting
- Double the 30x optical zoom range to an effective 60x with Clear Image Zoom (reduced picture quality)
- 5 cm minimum focusing distance
- Full HD 1080p movie mode in both normal and wide aspect ratio
- "Intelligent Sweep Panorama"
- As with most Sony Cyber-shot cameras it uses a BIONZ engine
- Built-in Wi-Fi
- Multi Interface Shoe for flash, electronic viewfinder or microphone
- Battery lasts for approx. 400 pictures, charging inside the camera (via miniUSB)
- AF system (without spot)
- Dust + push- sensitive objective

The Cyber-shot DSC-HX50/-(V)/-(VB) release to the USA was announced in 2013. The camera is the successor of the Sony DSC HX30/-(V)/-(VB) and been replaced by the Sony DSC HX60/-(V)/-(VB).

== Photo gallery ==
=== Camera ===
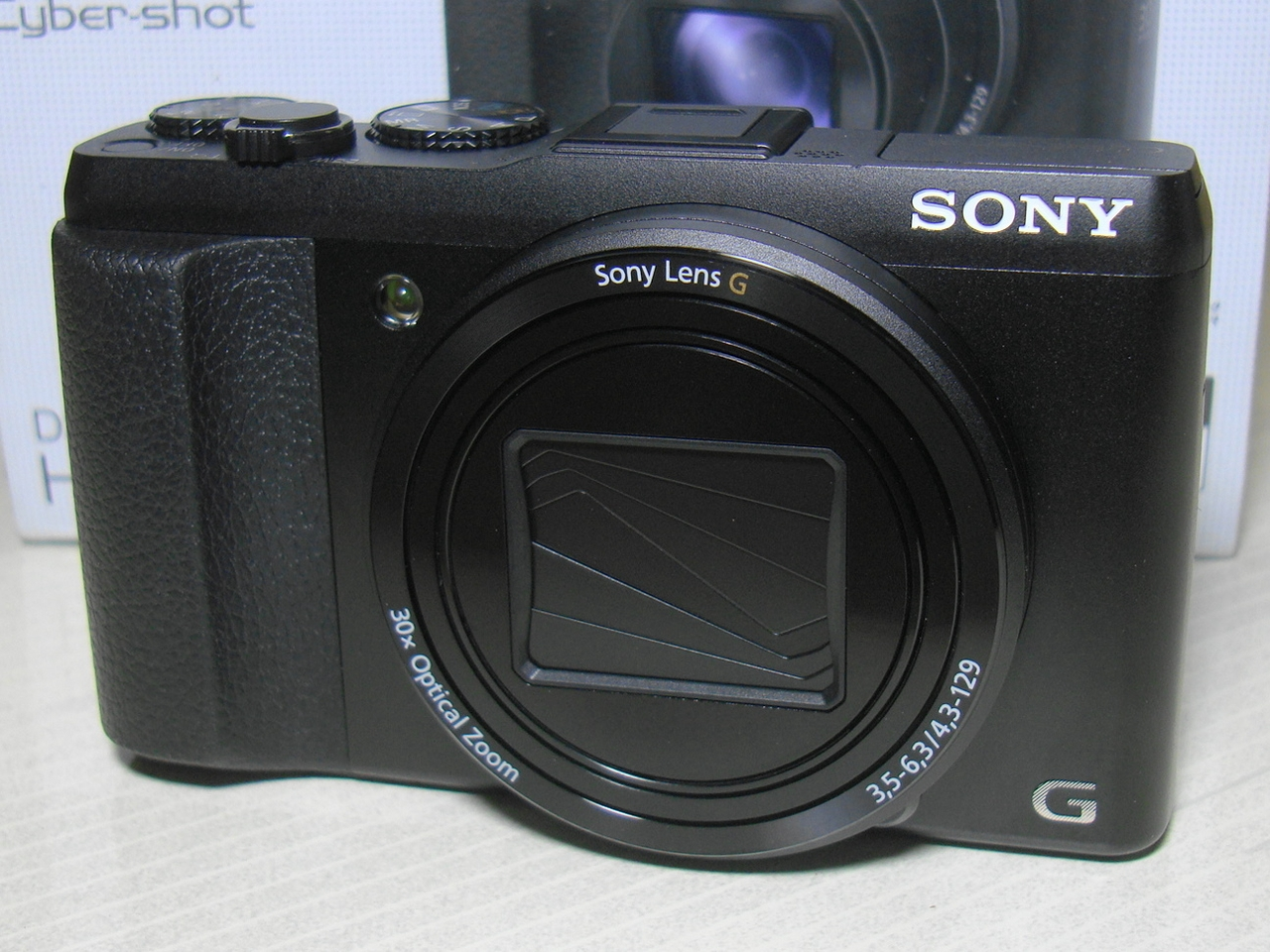
V - Version means with GPS

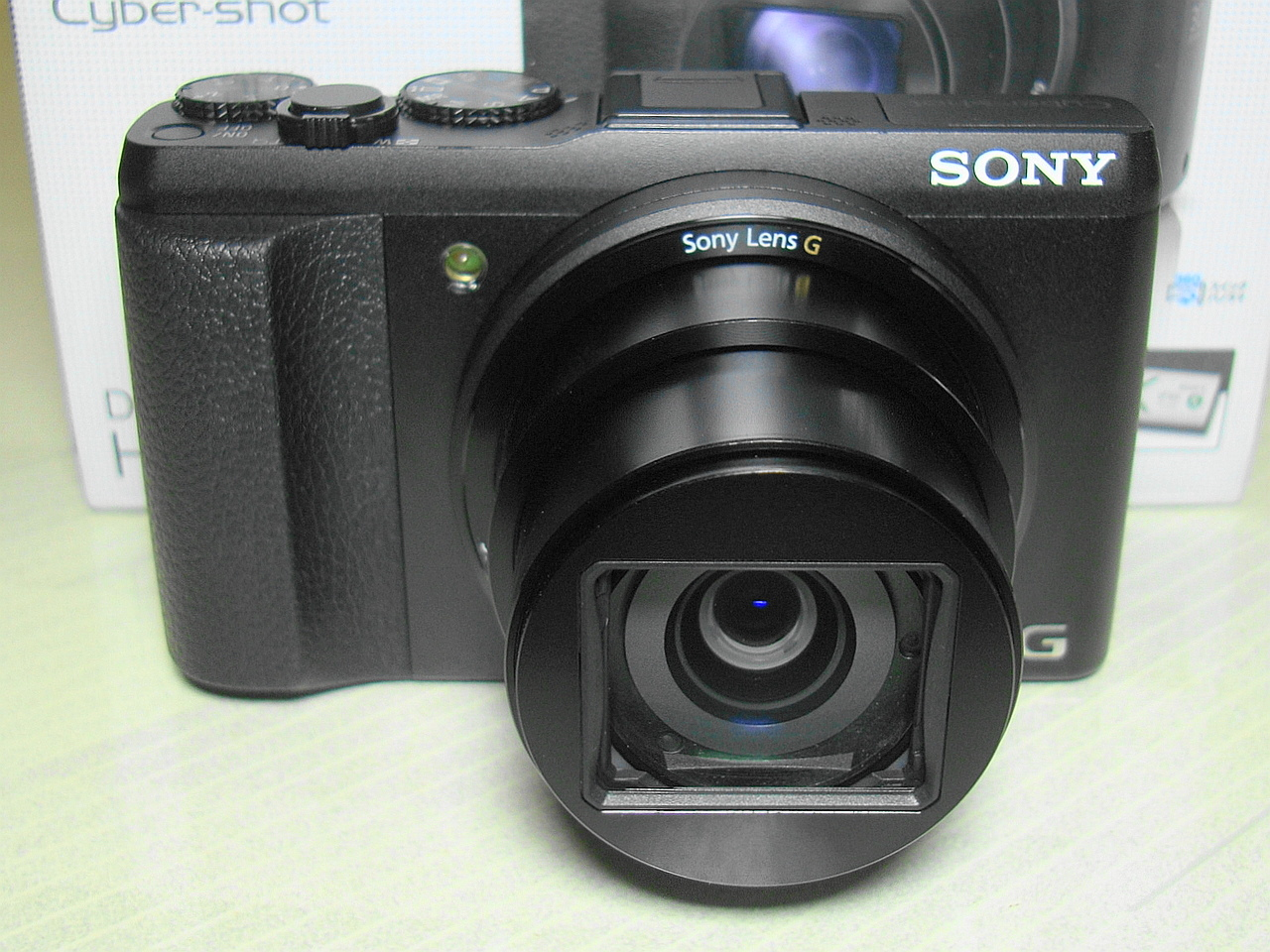
V - Version means with GPS

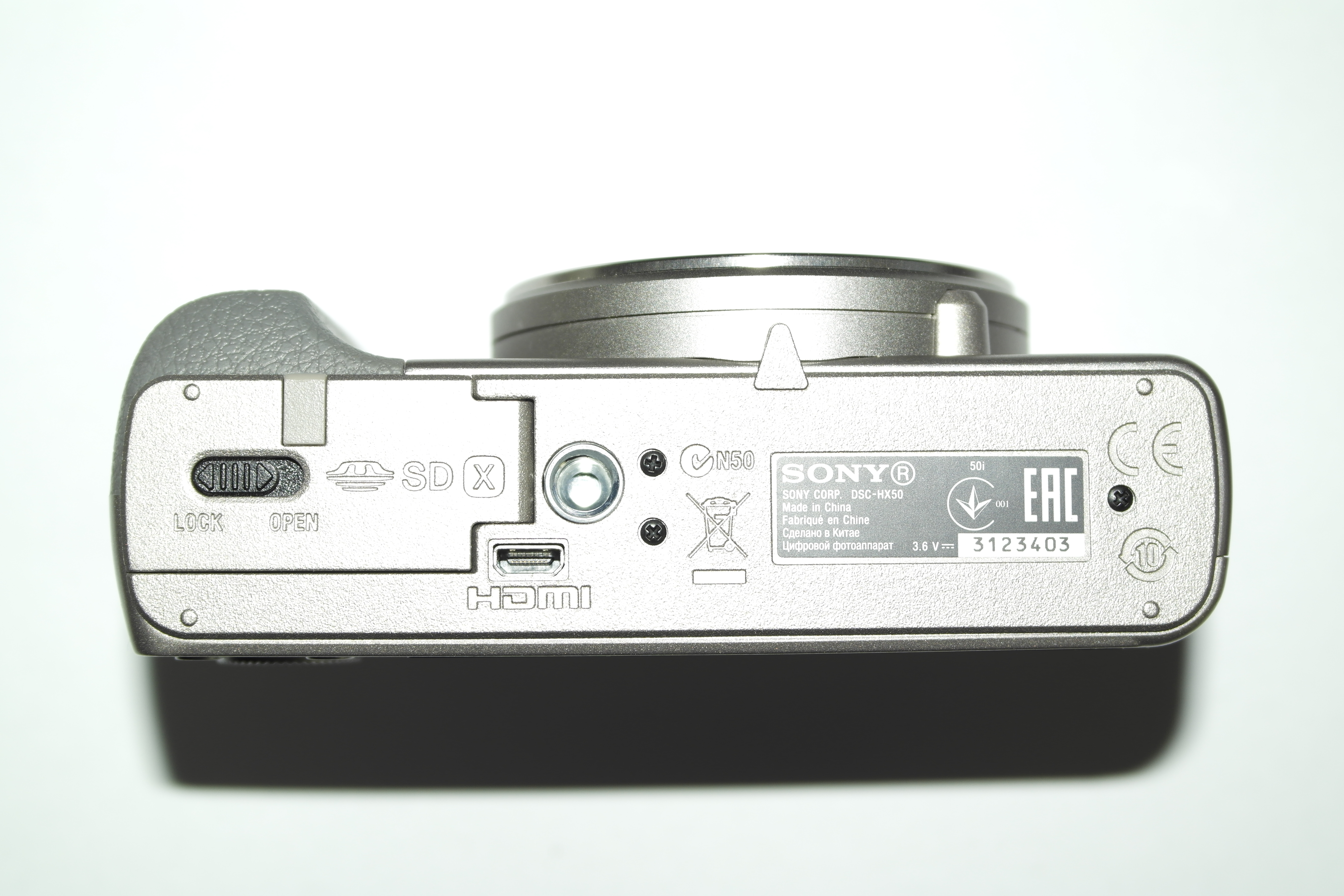
without GPS

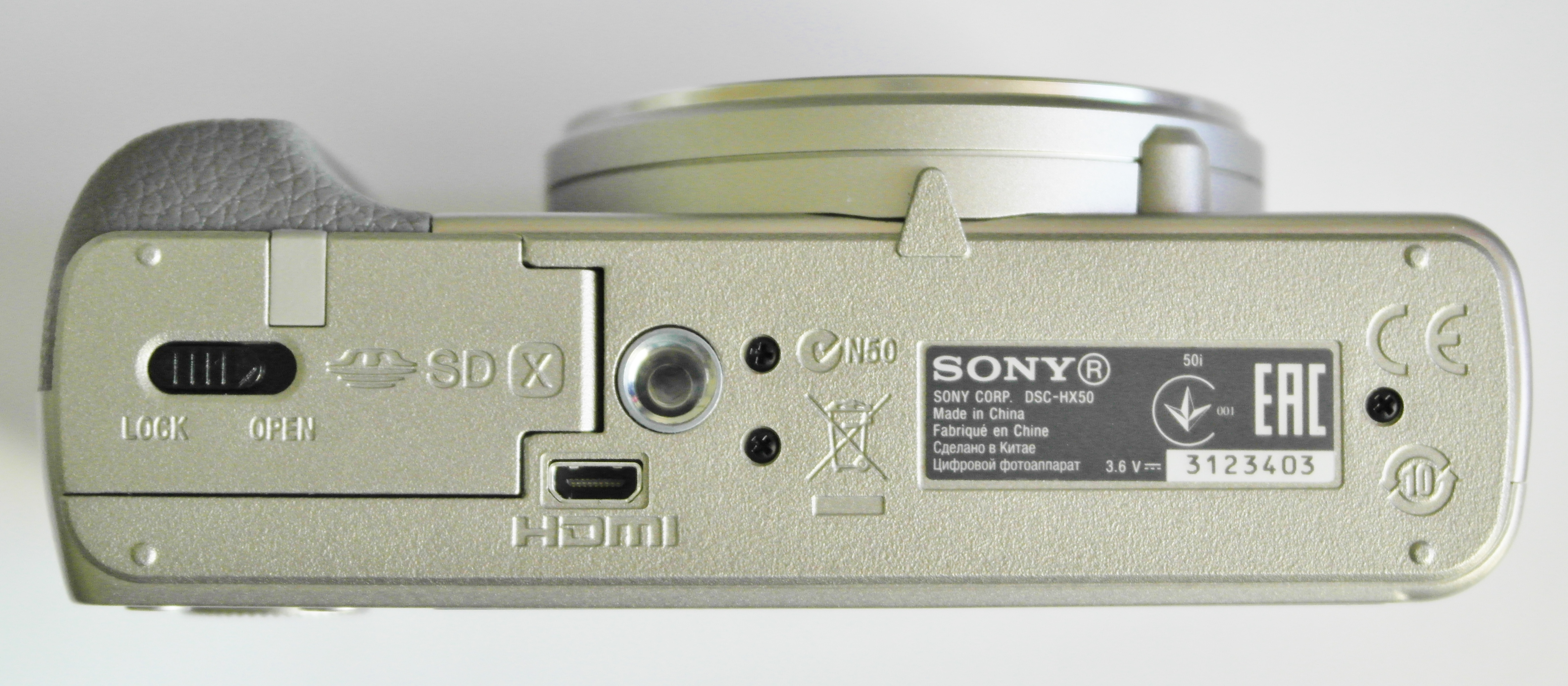
without GPS

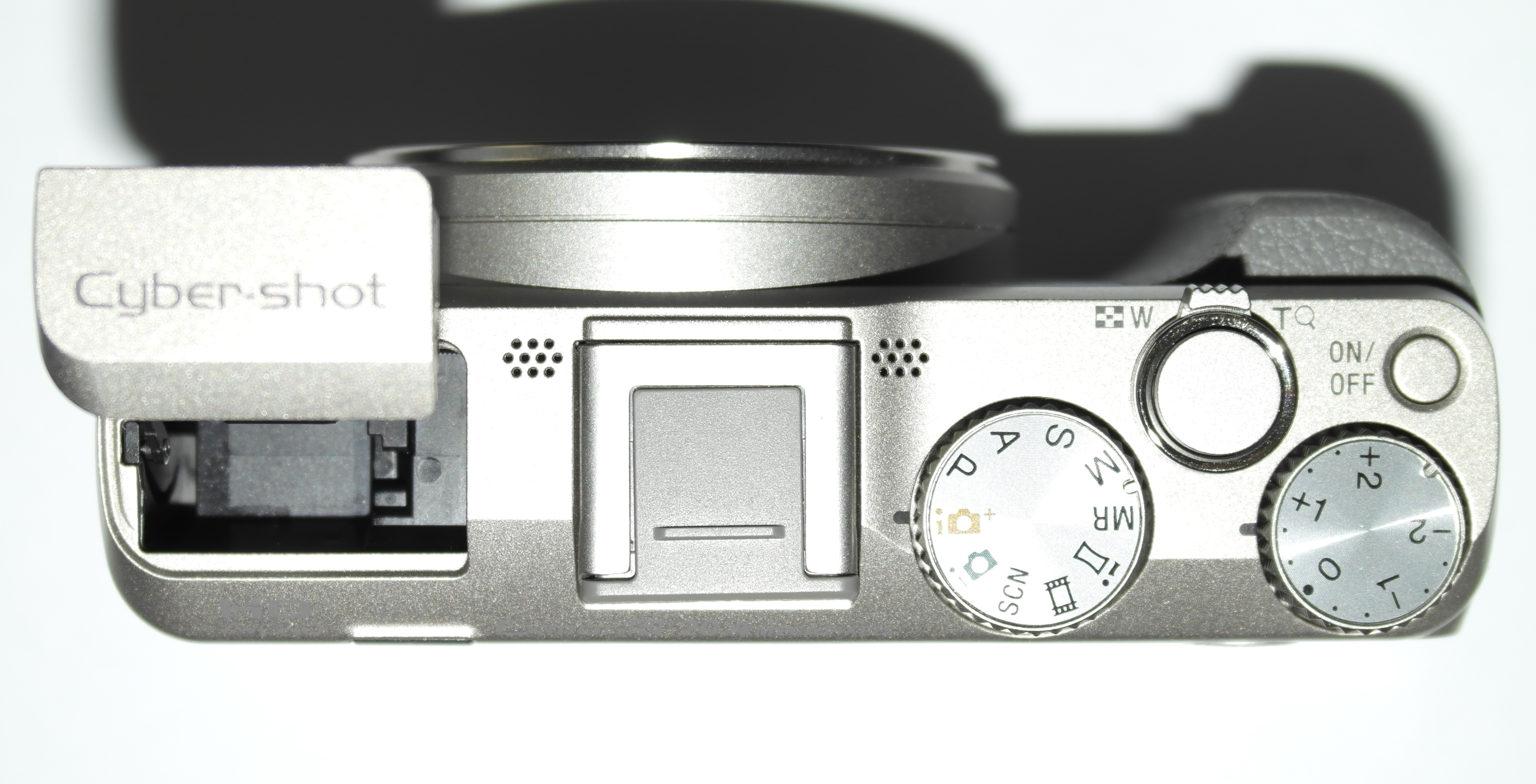
without GPS

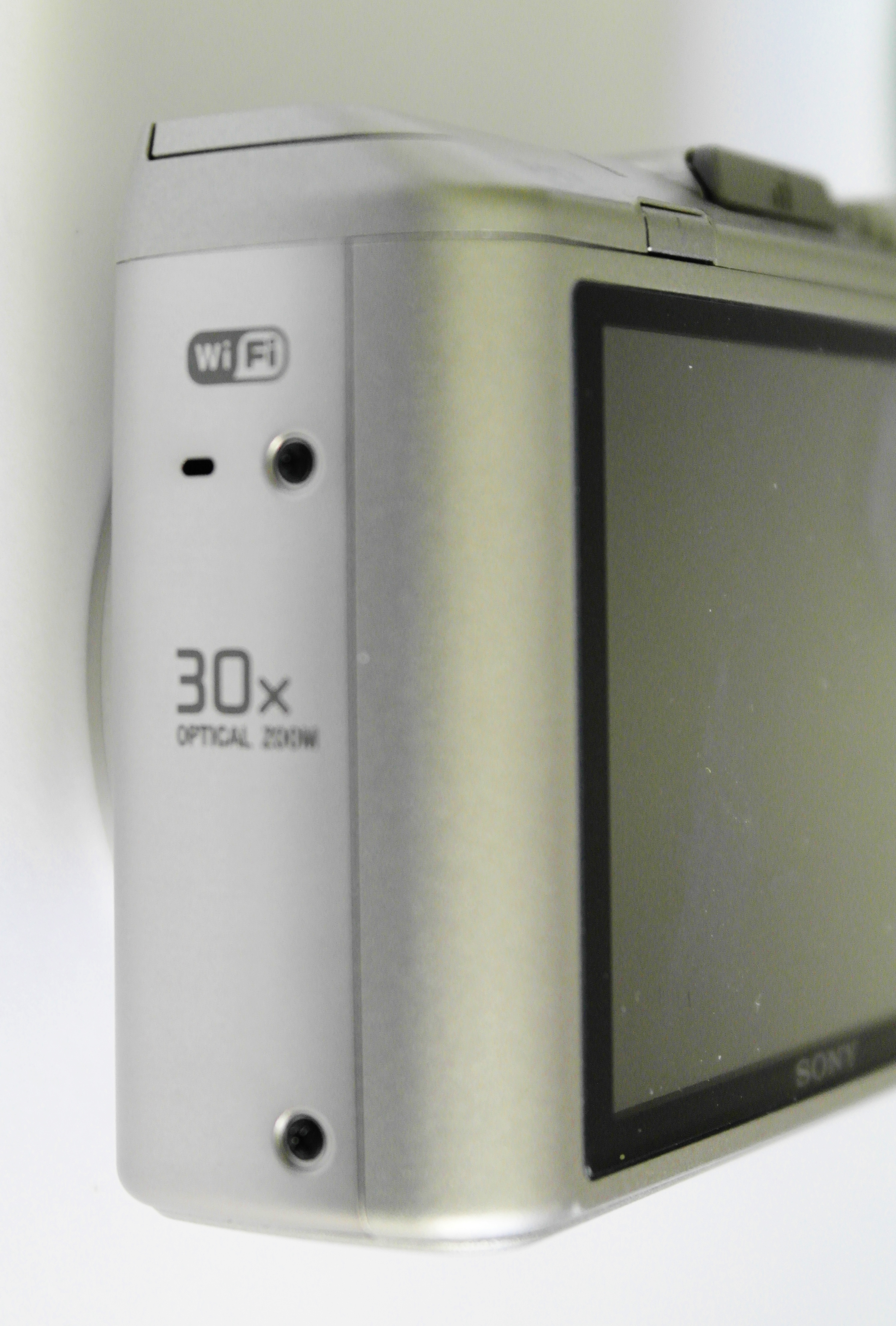
without GPS

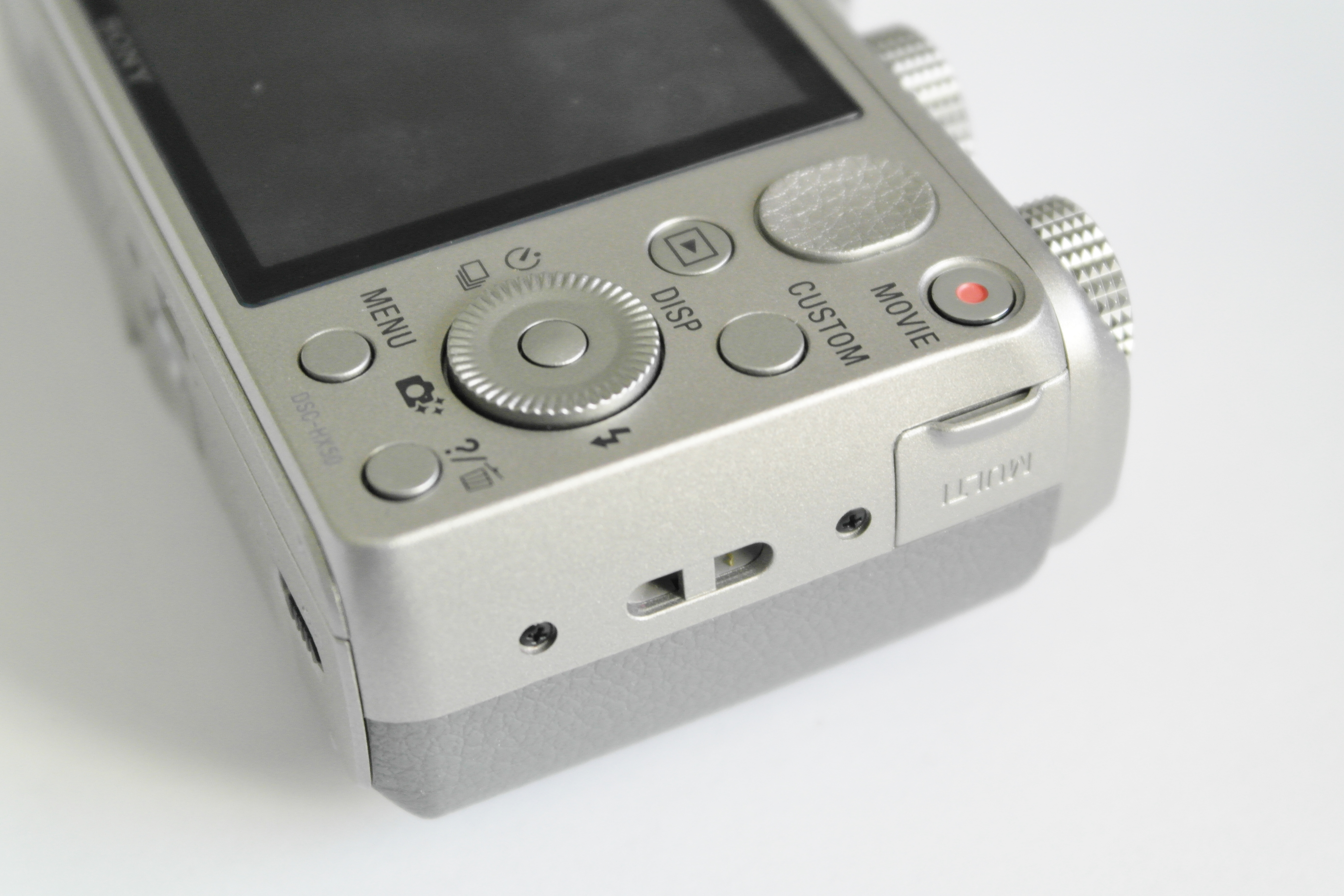
without GPS

=== Examples ===
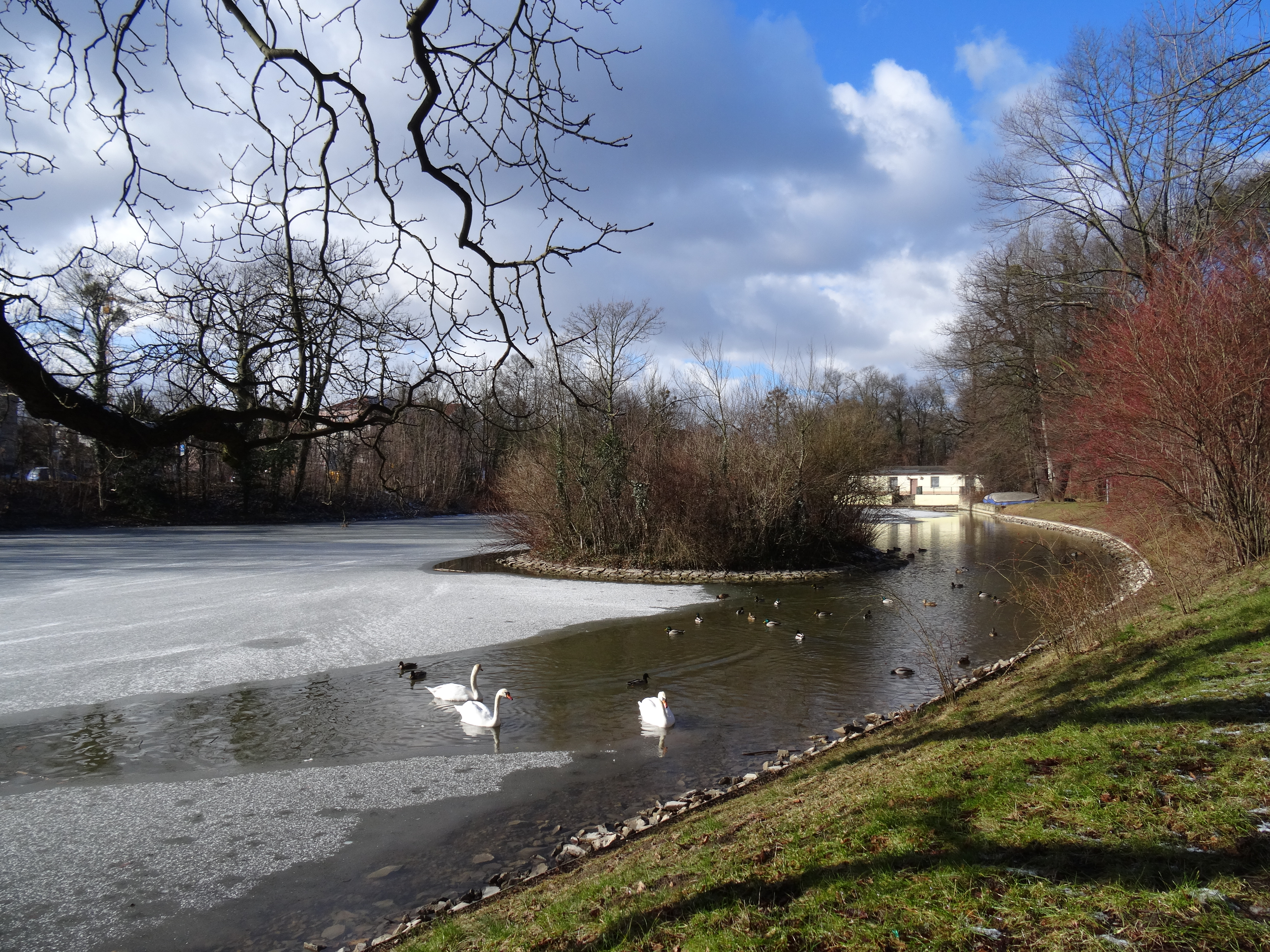

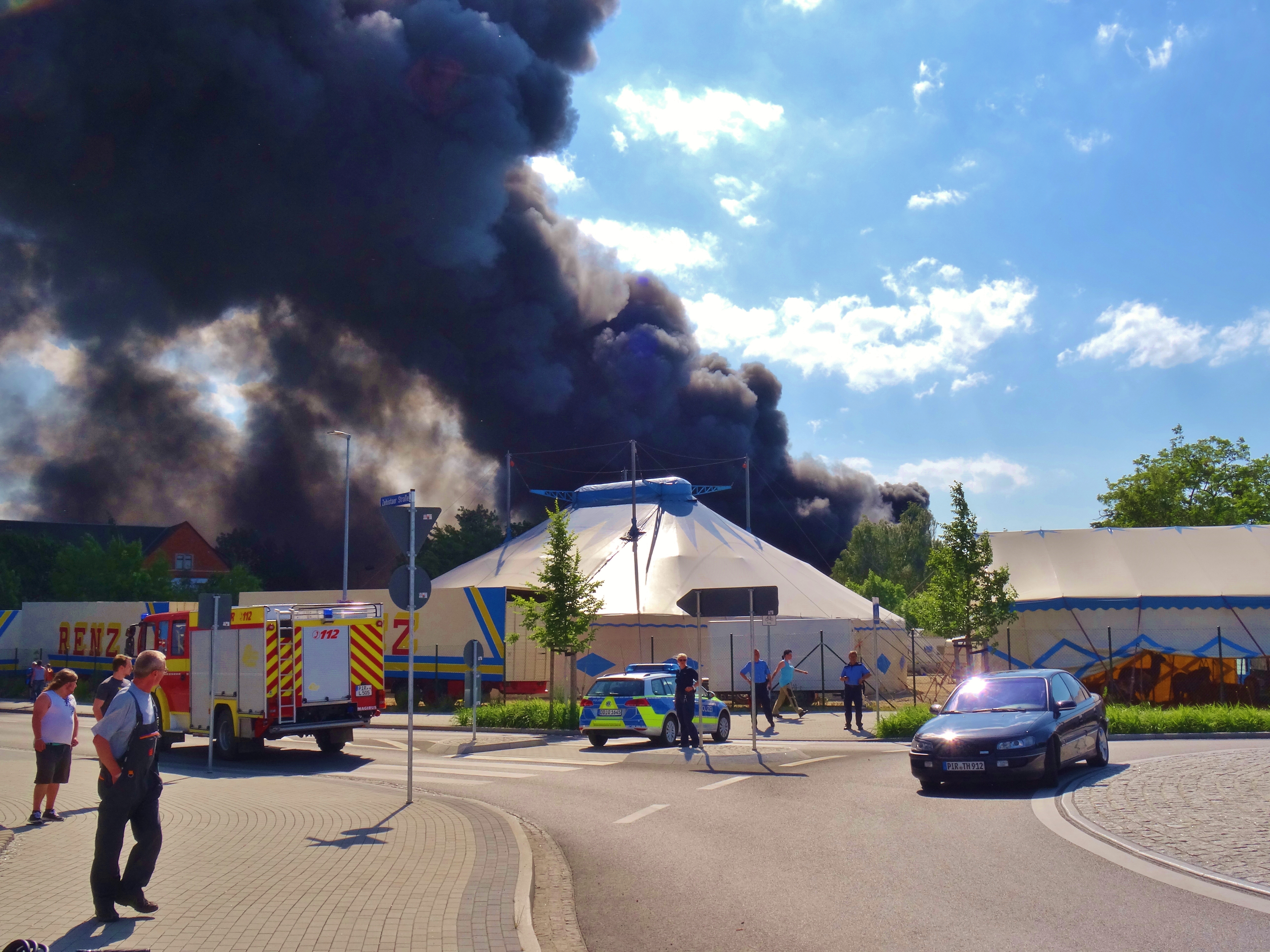

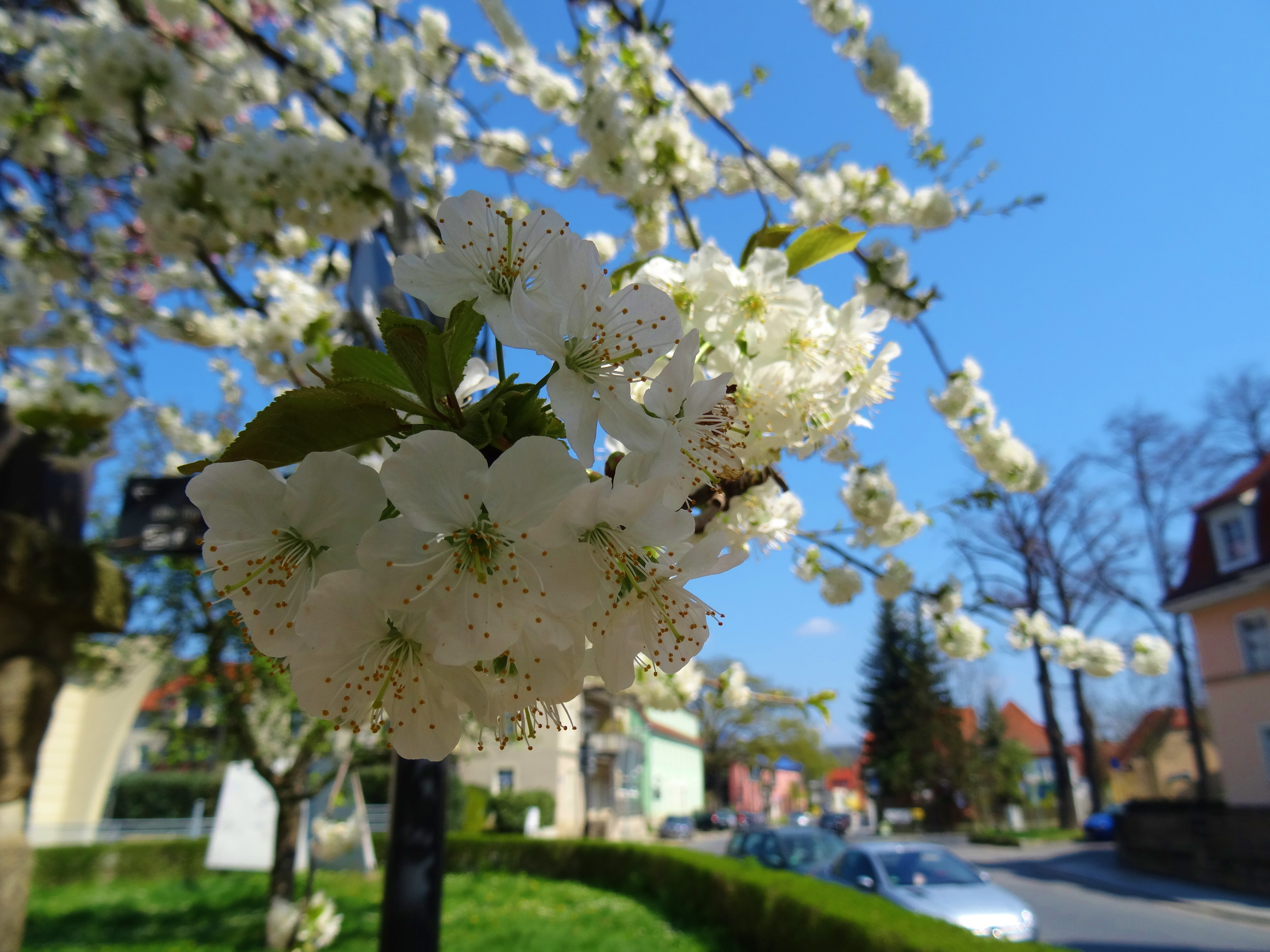

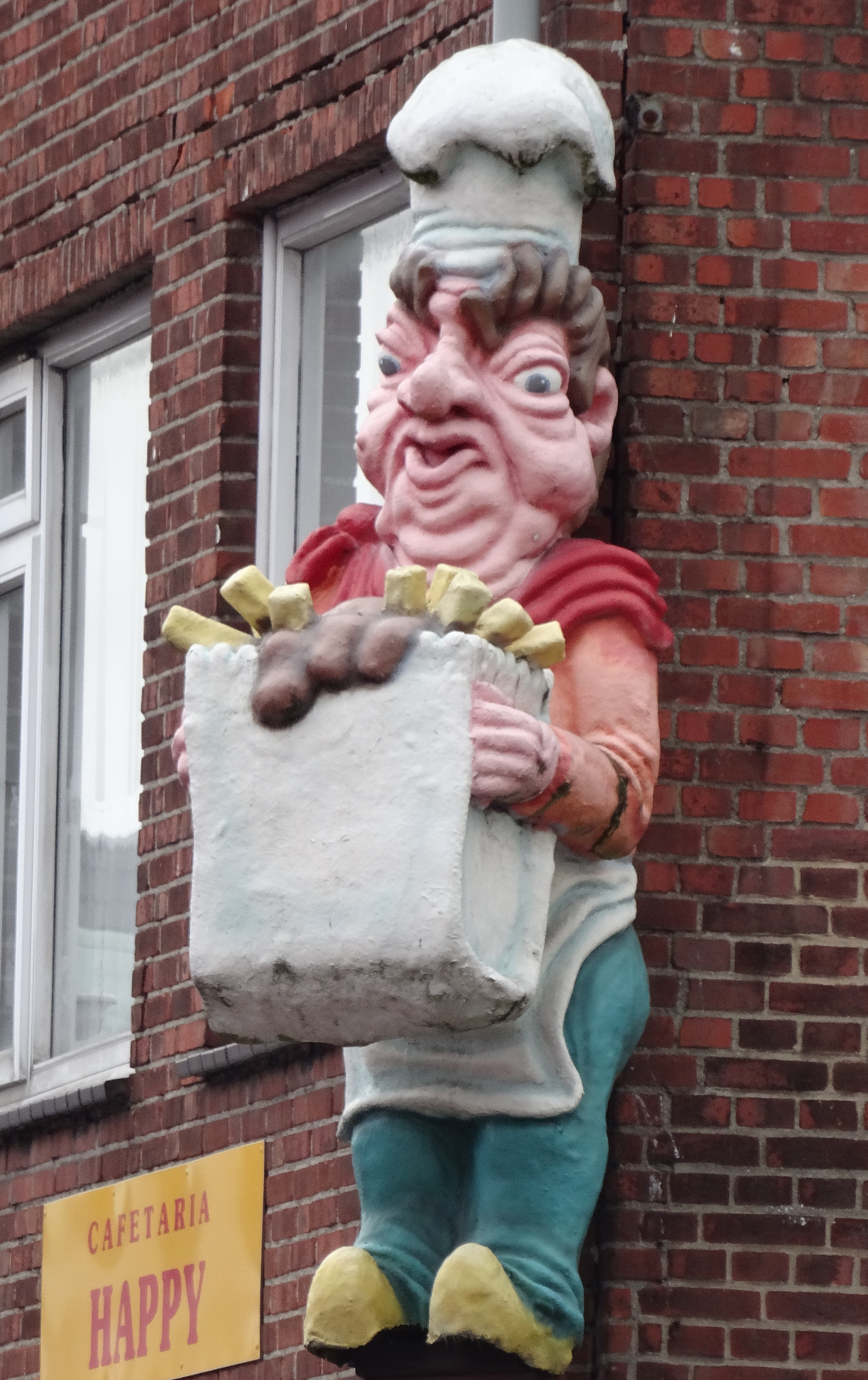

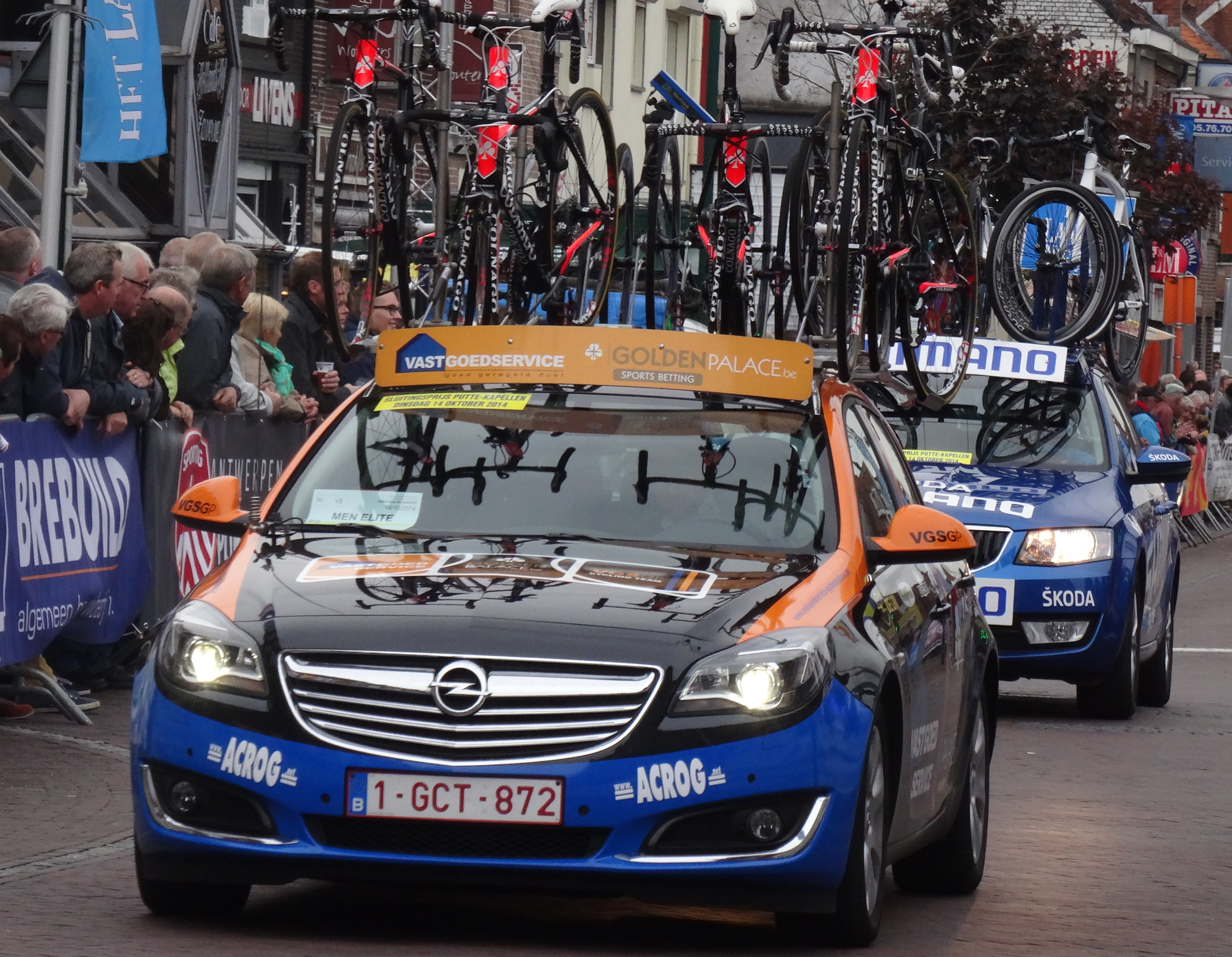

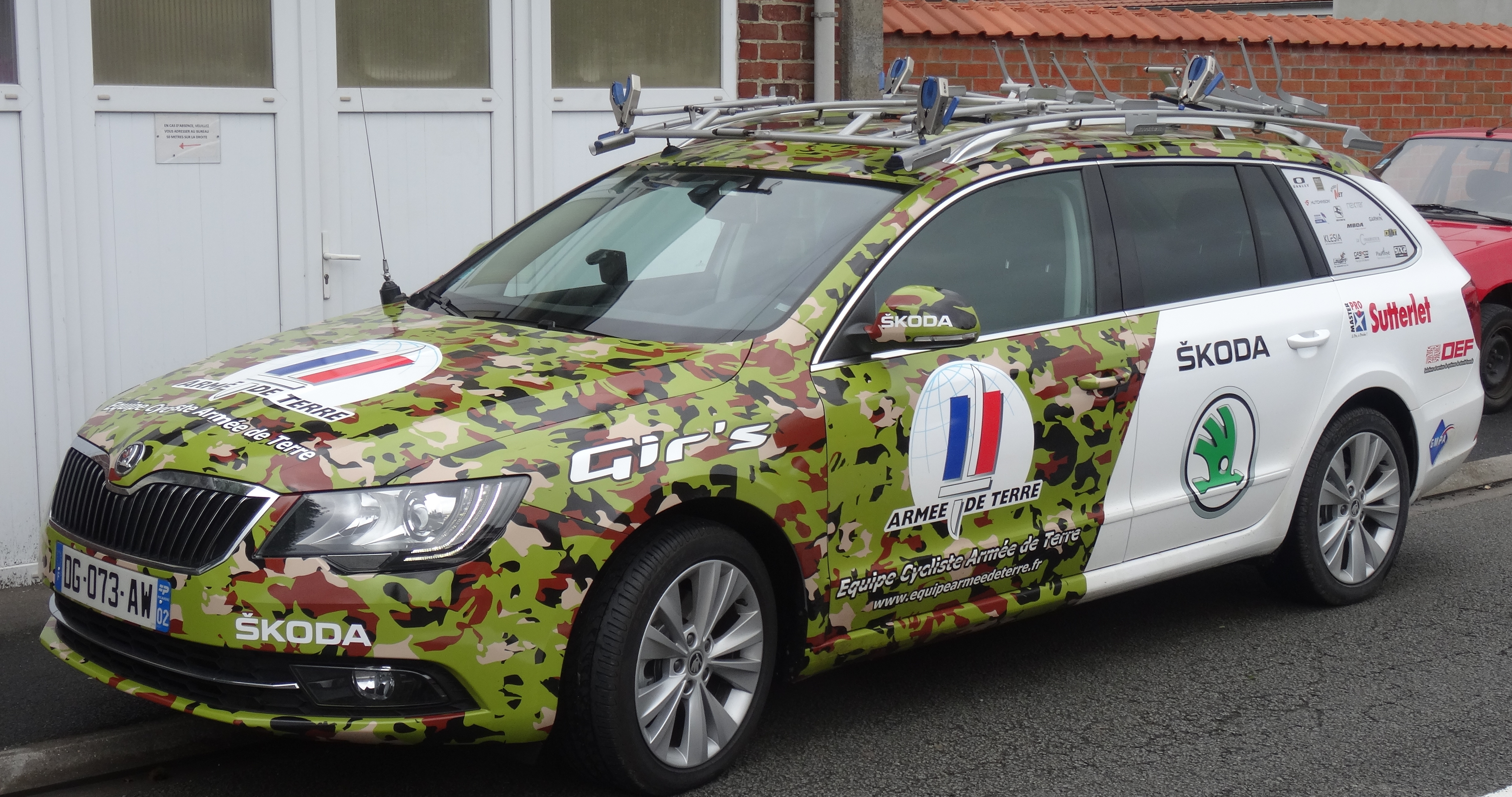

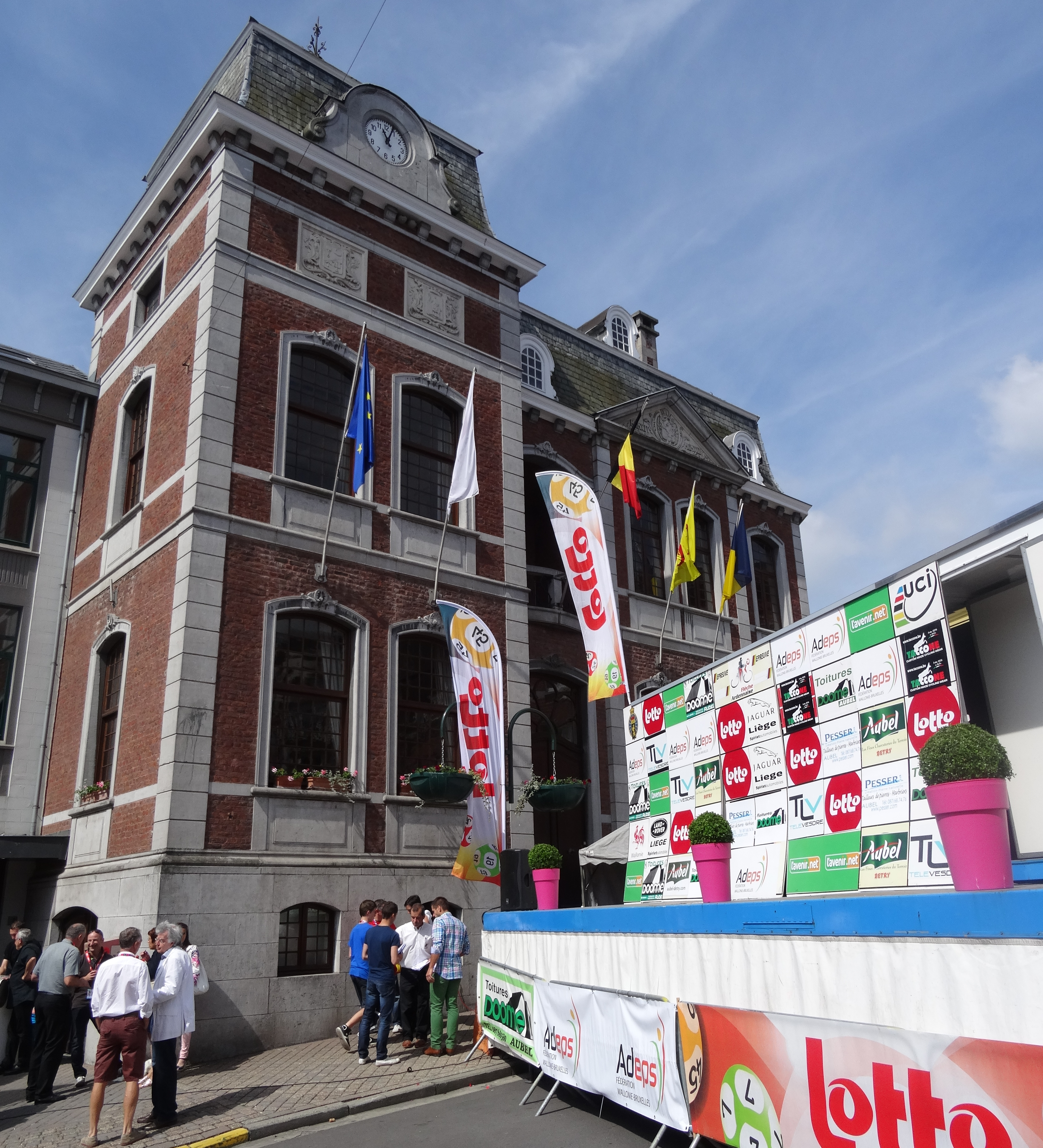

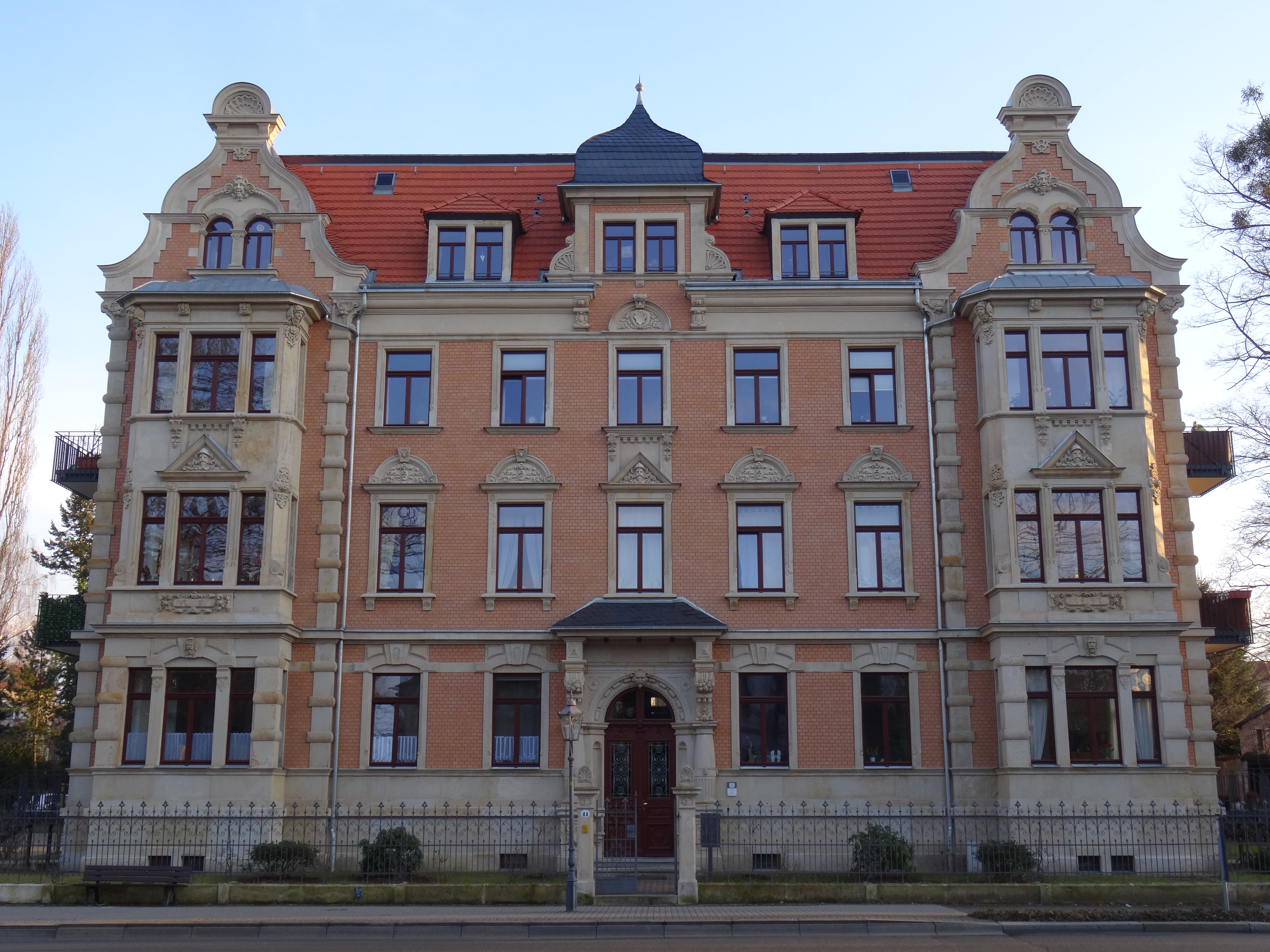

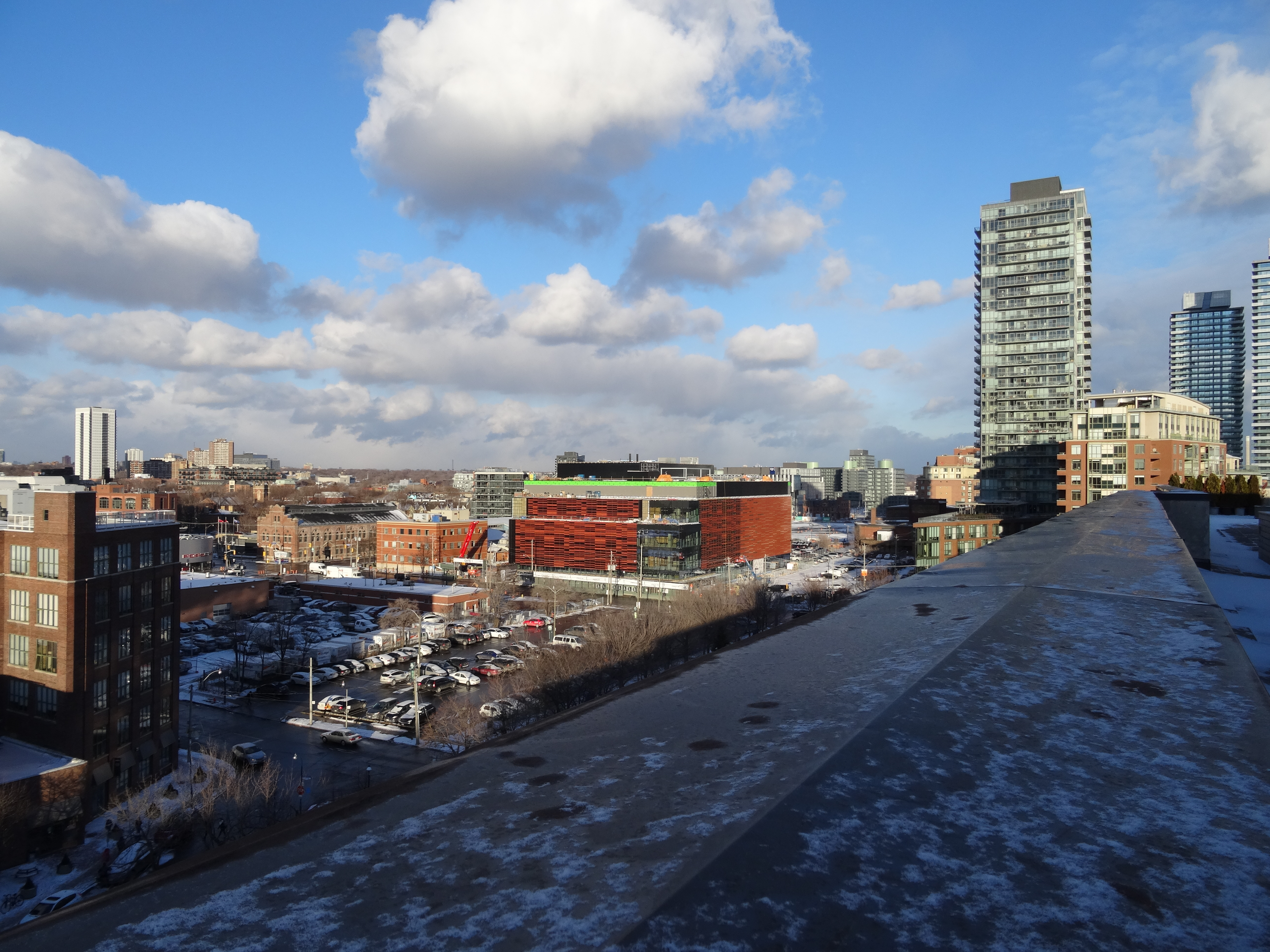

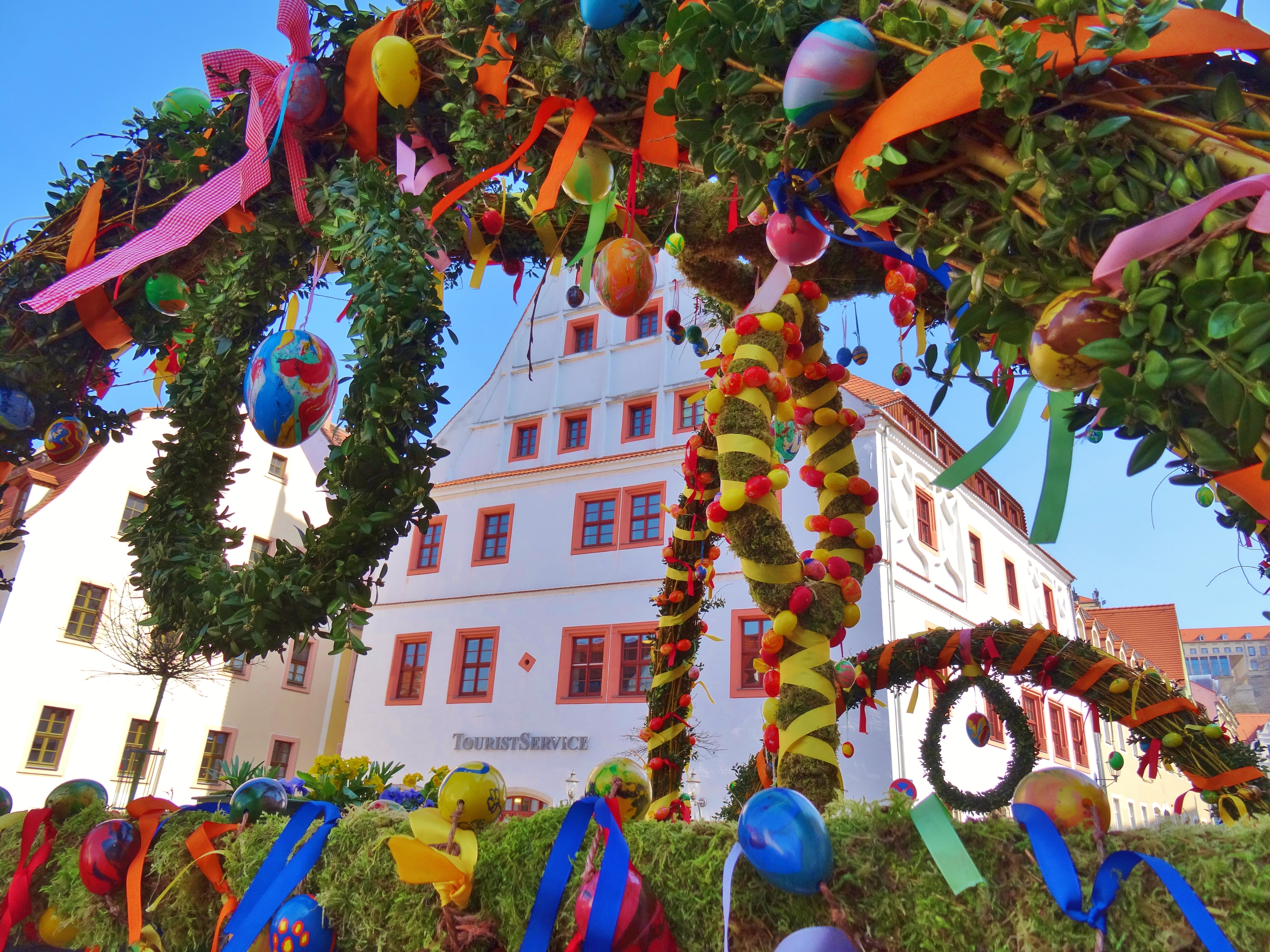

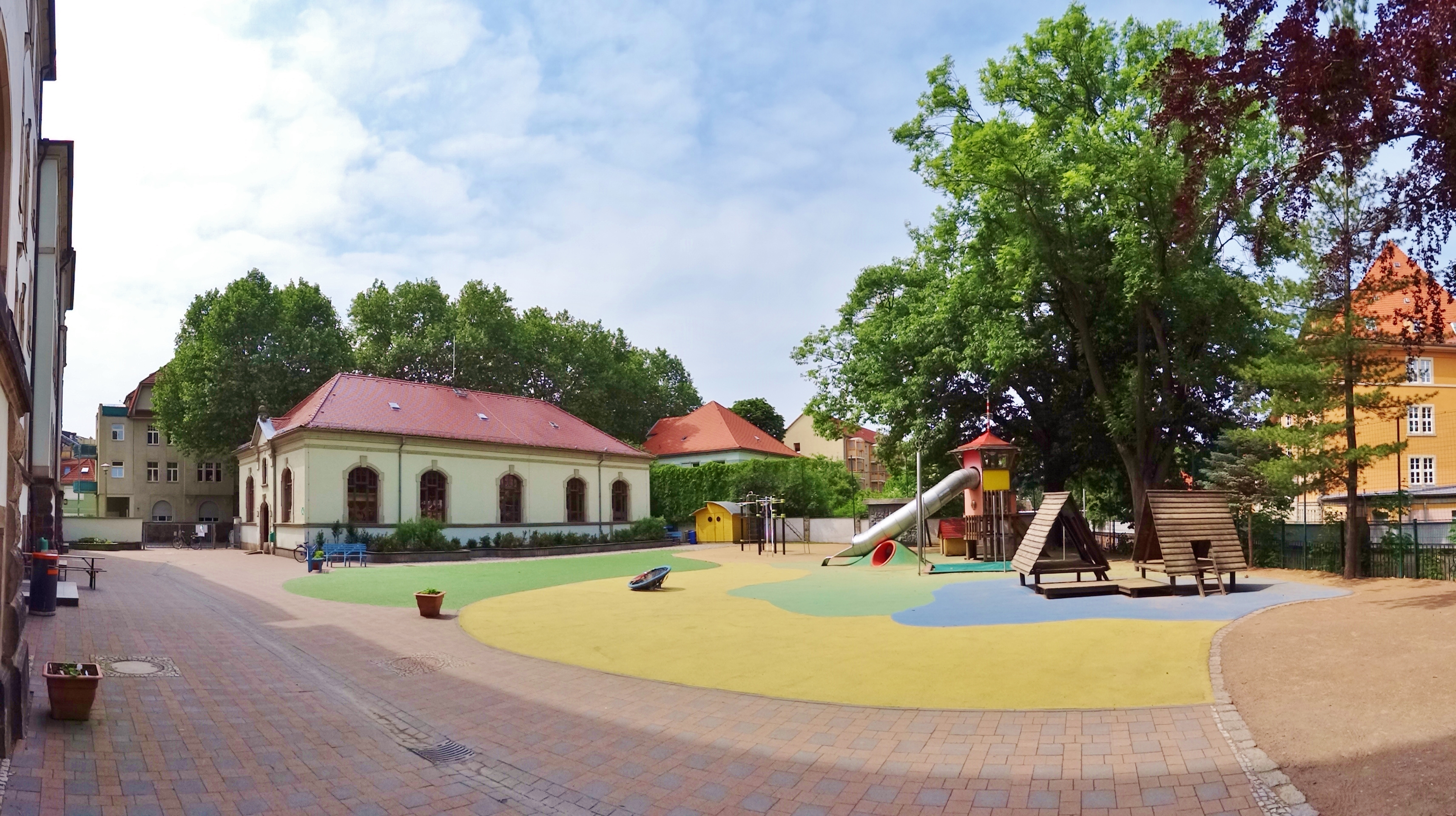

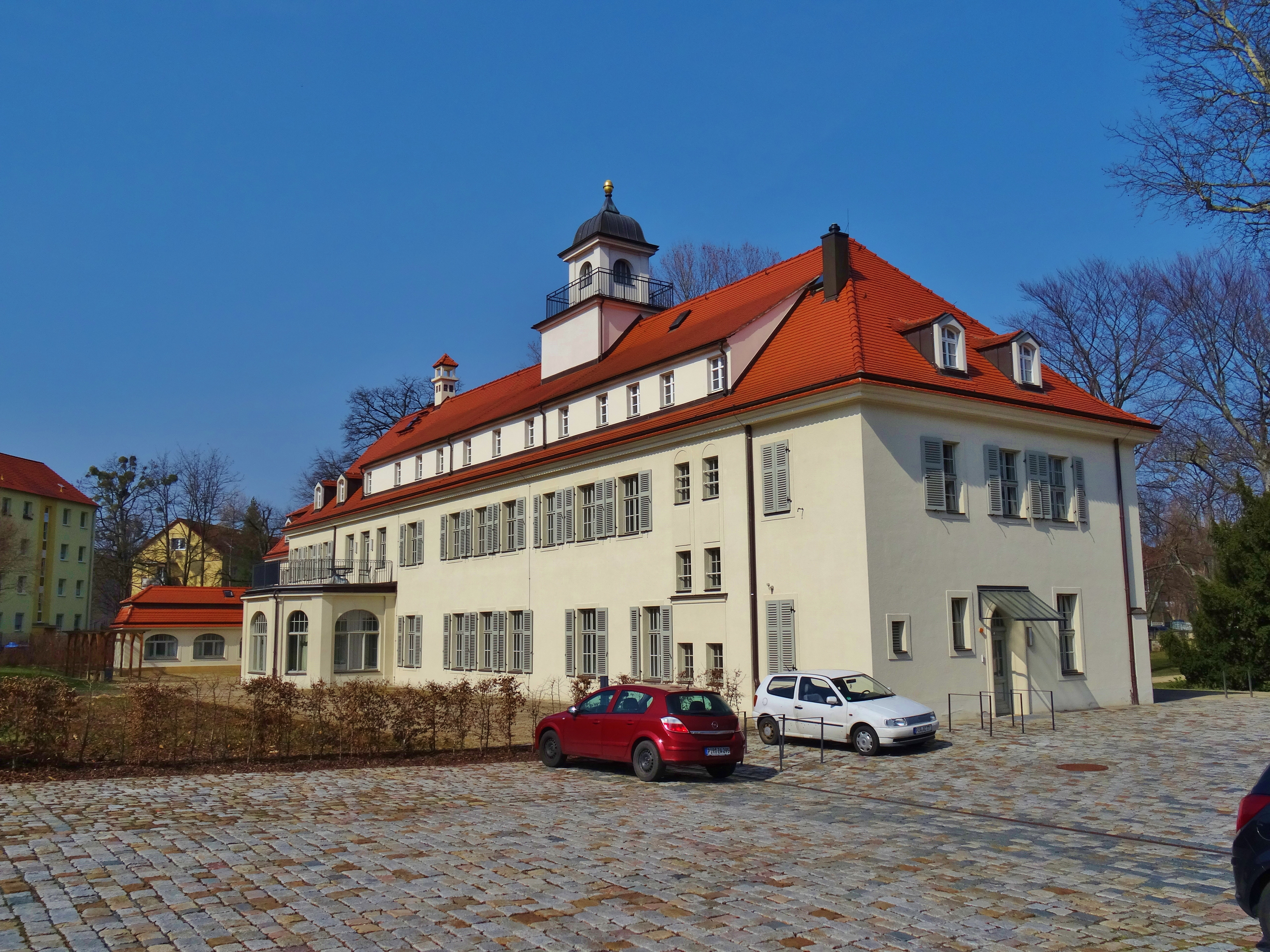

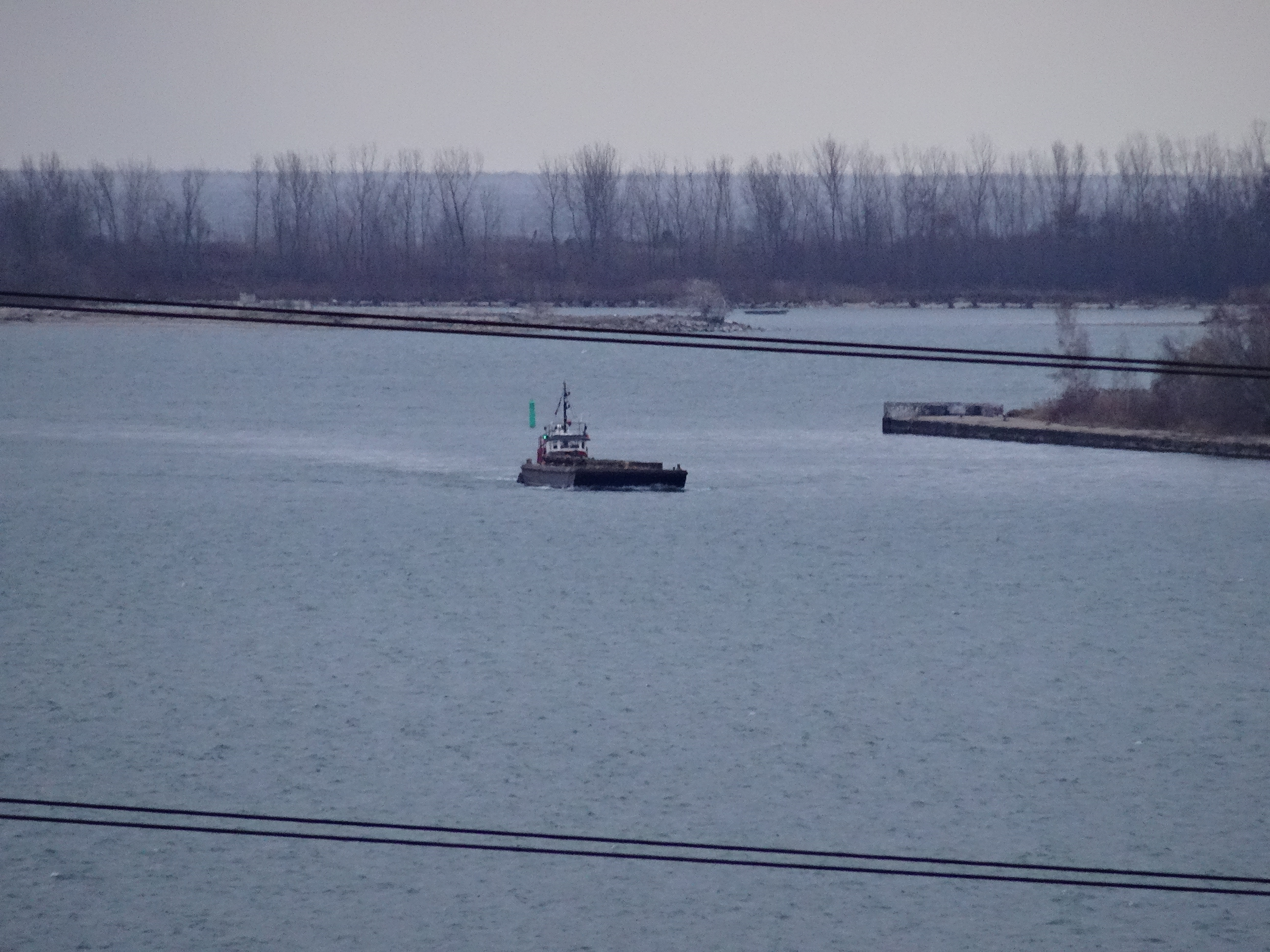

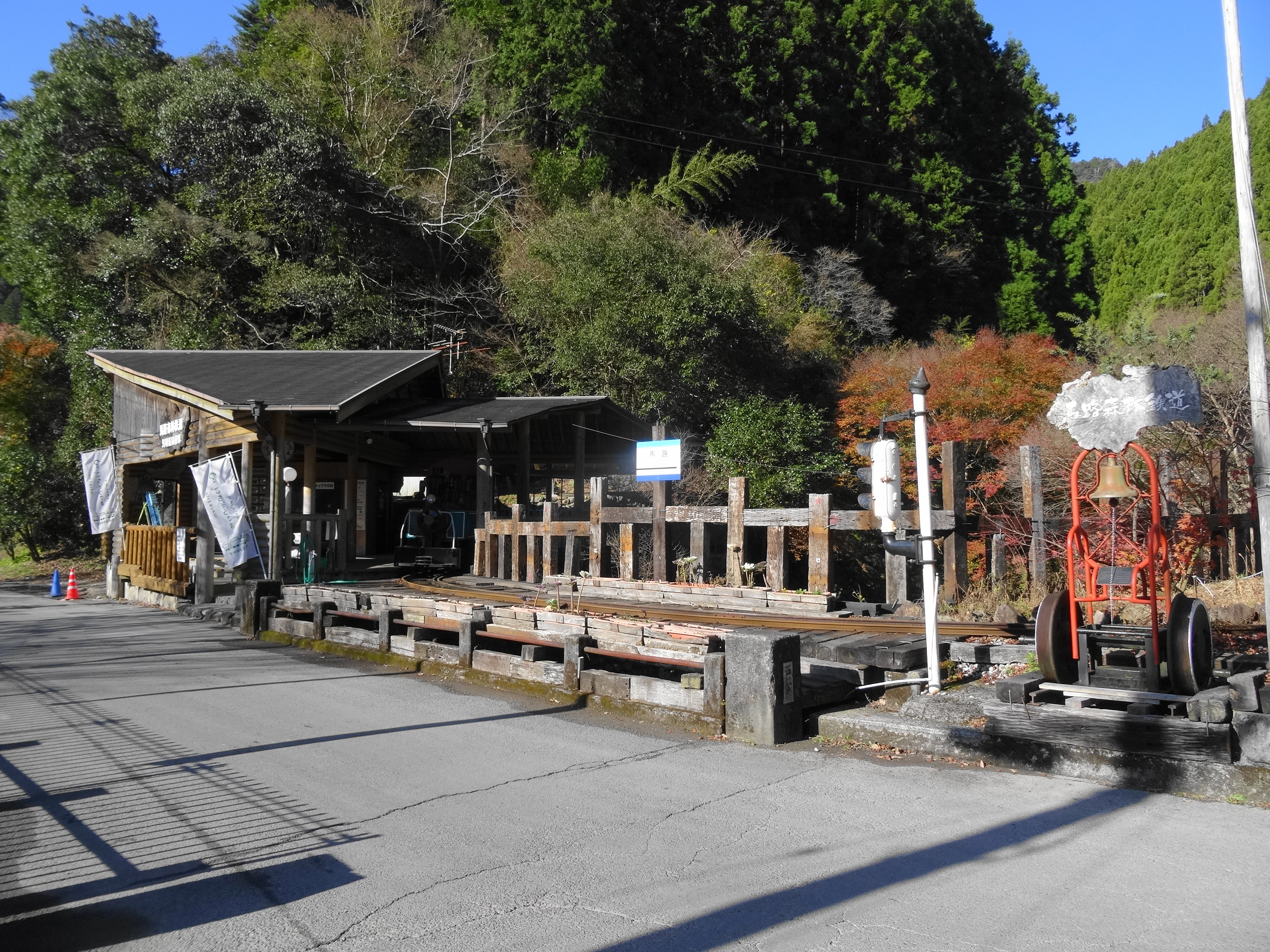

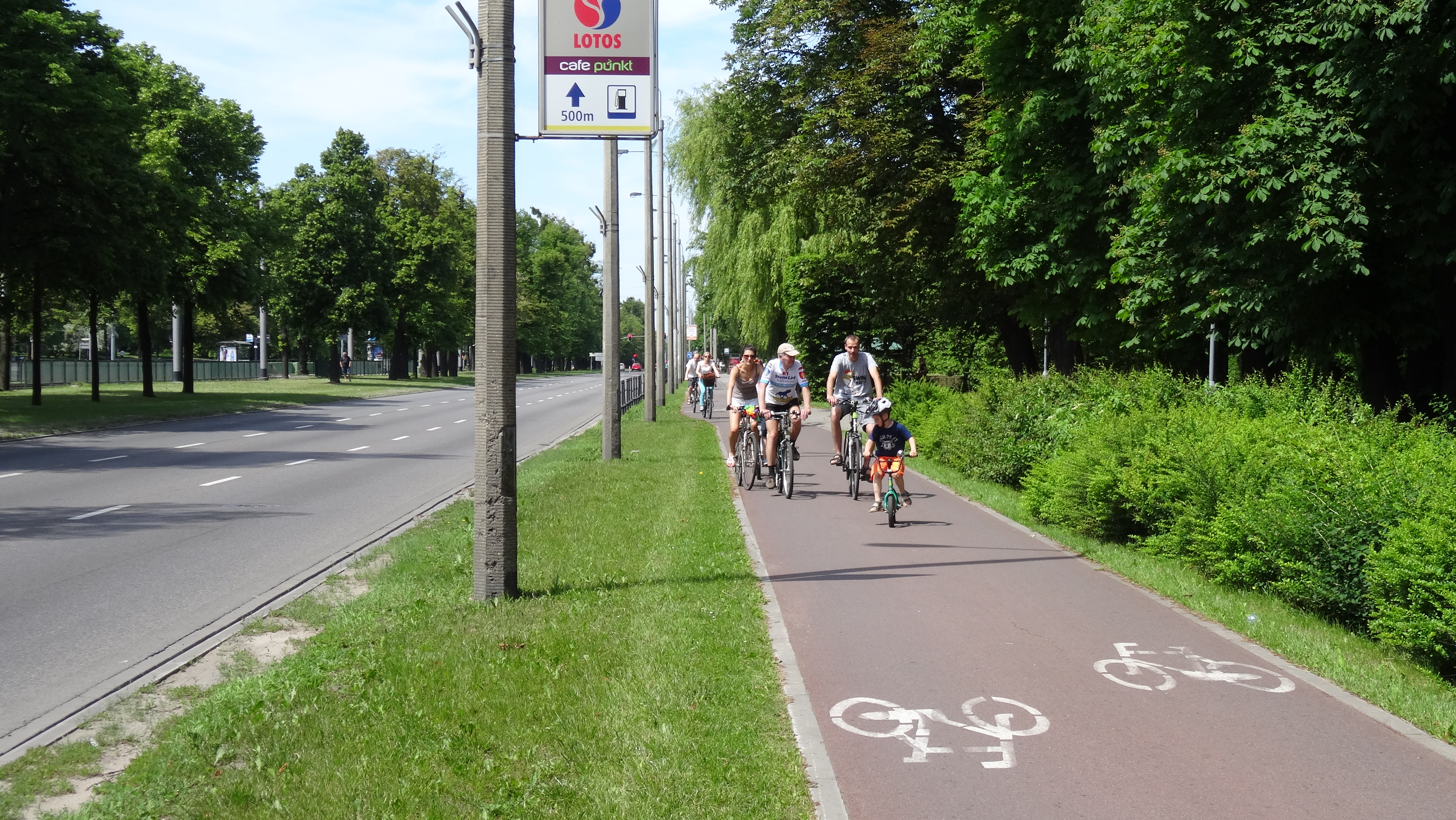

== See also ==
- List of superzoom compact cameras

== External official infos ==
- Data sheet
