= Sony Cyber-shot DSC-RX100 series =

Digital camera series

The Sony Cyber-shot DSC-RX100 series is a series of high-end compact cameras, a part of the wider Sony RX series. It started with the DSC-RX100, announced on 6 June 2012, and is part of the Cyber-shot RX line of digital cameras made by Sony. Seven annual generations have been released so far until 2019, all equipped with a one-inch 20-Megapixel image sensor and rotary knob around the lens. Filming at up to 1080p (Full HD) at 60fps is supported by the first three generations, the third additionally with 720p at 120fps, and up to 2160p (4K) at 30fps and 1080p at 120fps high frame rate video since the fourth.

== Cyber-shot DSC-RX100 (original) ==
Sony Cyber-shot DSC-RX100
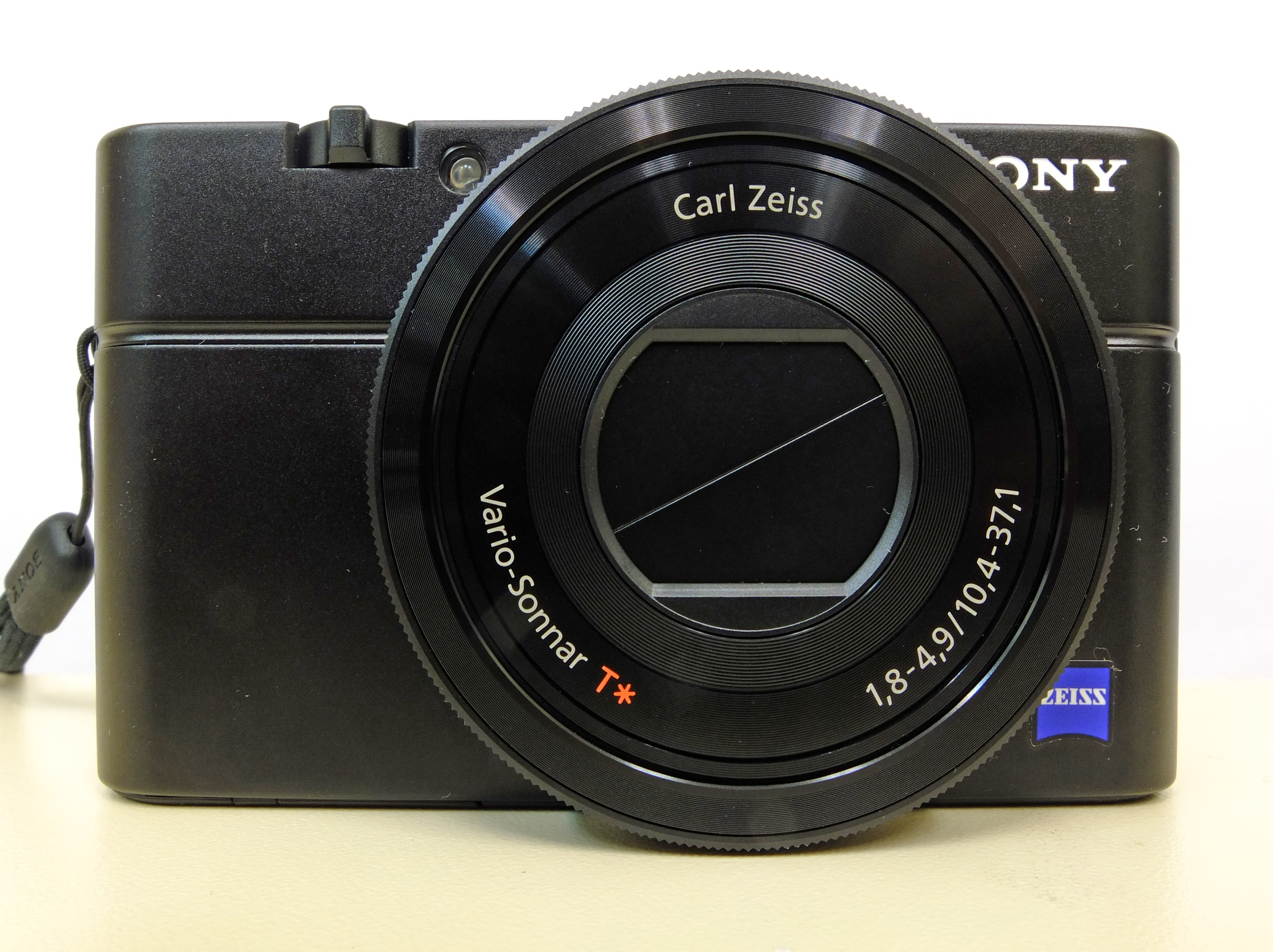

Overview
- Maker: Sony
- Type: Large sensor fixed-lens camera

Lens
- Lens: Non-interchangeable Carl Zeiss Vario-Sonnar T* lens
- F-numbers: Focal Length (35 mm equivalent): Still 16:9 29-105mm / Still 4:3 30-108 mm / Still 3:2 28-100 mm / Still 1:1 36-127 mm / Movie 16:9 29-105 mm (Std), 33-120 mm (Active) / Movie 4:3 36–128 mm (Std), 41-146 mm (Active)

Sensor/medium
- Sensor type: Exmor CMOS sensor
- Sensor size: 1‑inch format, 13.2 × 8.8 mm, 3:2 aspect ratio
- Sensor maker: Sony
- Maximum resolution: 20.2 MP
- Recording medium: Memory Stick Duo, Memory Stick PRO Duo, Memory Stick PRO Duo (High Speed), Memory Stick PRO-HG Duo, SD Memory Card, SDHC Memory Card, SDXC Memory Card

Focusing
- Focus: Single-shot AF (AF-S) / Continuous AF (AF-C) / Direct Manual Focus (DMF) / Manual Focus AF Modes: Multi point AF (25 points) / Center weighted AF / Flexible spot / Flexible spot (tracking focus) / Flexible sport (face tracking)

Exposure/metering
- Exposure: Exposure/metering

Flash
- Flash: Pop-up, tiltable

Shutter
- Frame rate: US: 60p, UK: 50p
- Shutter: iAuto (4-1/2000) / Program Auto (1-1/2000) / Manual (Bulb, 30-1/2000) / Aperture Priority (8-1/2000) / Shutter Priority (30-1/2000)
- Shutter speed range: 1/2000-30" and BULB Mode
- Shutter speeds: 10 fps at 20.2 MP

Viewfinder
- Viewfinder: None

General
- Video recording: US: AVCHD 2.0, MP4, Video Mode: AVCHD: 28M PS (1920×1080, 60p) / 24M FX (1920×1080, 60i ) / 17M FH (1920×1080, 60i) MP4: 12M (1440×1080, 30 fps) / 3M VGA (640×480 30 fps); UK: 1920×1080 50p Approx. 28 Mbps) (AVCHD), (1920×1080 50i Approx. 24 Mbps) (AVCHD), 1920×1080 50i Approx. 17 Mbps) (AVCHD), 1440×1080 30 fps Fine Approx. 12 Mbps) (MP4), 640×480 30 fps Approx. 3 Mbps) (VGA)
- LCD screen: 3 in. (7.6 cm) / 1,229k dots TFT (3:2)
- Battery: Lithium-ion NP-BX1
- Dimensions: 4 in. × 2 3/8 in. × 1 7/16 in. (101.6 mm × 58.1 mm × 35.9 mm)
- Weight: 8.5 oz (240 g) with battery
- Made in: Japan and China

The original RX100 was named as the "European Advanced Compact Camera for 2012–2013" by the European Imaging and Sound Association (EISA) and one of the 'Best Inventions of 2012' by TIME.

Specifications

- 1 in. type (13.2 mm × 8.8 mm) CMOS Exmor sensor (2.7x crop factor). This uses the "Column-Parallel A/D Conversion Technique" to create more detailed images in low light conditions than smaller-sensor cameras.
- 10 fps burst shooting capability at 20.2 MP resolution.
- M, A, S, P modes available
- Tiltable pop-up flash, allowing bounce flash.
- Large maximum aperture, f/1.8-f/4.9 Carl Zeiss Vario-Sonnar T* lens.
- Focus peaking display available.
- 3.6× optical zoom, Carl Zeiss T* Vario Sonnar lens (28–100 mm 35mm equivalent focal length range [10.4–37.1 mm actual focal length])
- 3 in. TFT LCD (fixed) with 1.29 million dots, using RGBW configuration
- RAW shooting possible (giving enhanced post-capture image editing options)
- FULL HD video shooting (AVCHD, 50 fps)
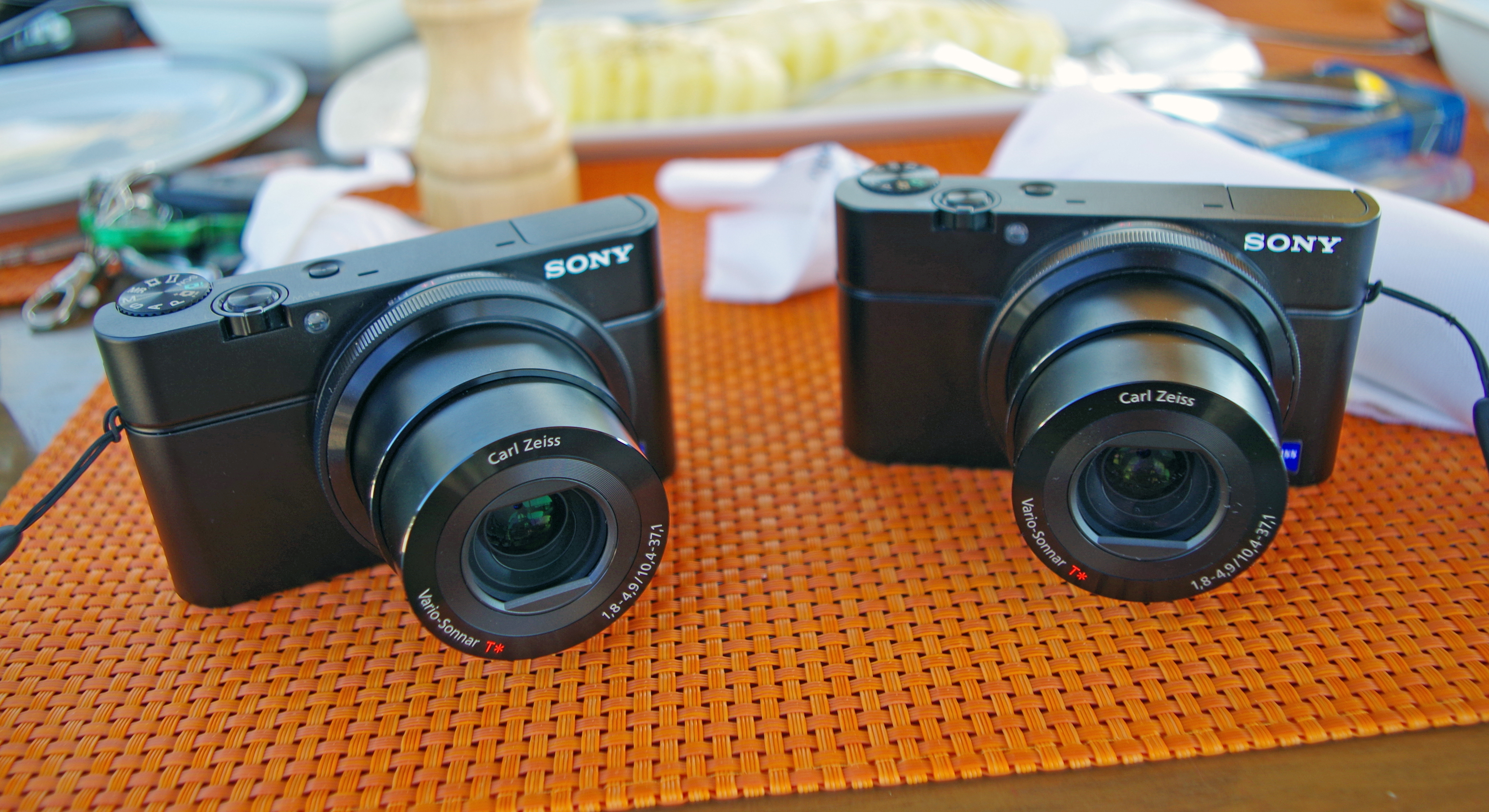
Two Sony Cyber-shot DSC-RX100s

== Cyber-shot DSC-RX100 II ==
In June 2013, Sony unveiled a new edition of the camera called the RX100 II. New features included:

- 20.2-megapixel 1 in. type Exmor R CMOS sensor, notable for being a back-illuminated sensor
- Maximum native ISO mode expanded to 12800 (approx. 40% more light sensitivity)
- Tiltable LCD (+84°/−45°)
- Multi Interface Shoe
- Wi-Fi connectivity
- NFC connectivity
- Full HD video shooting mode (1080/24p)
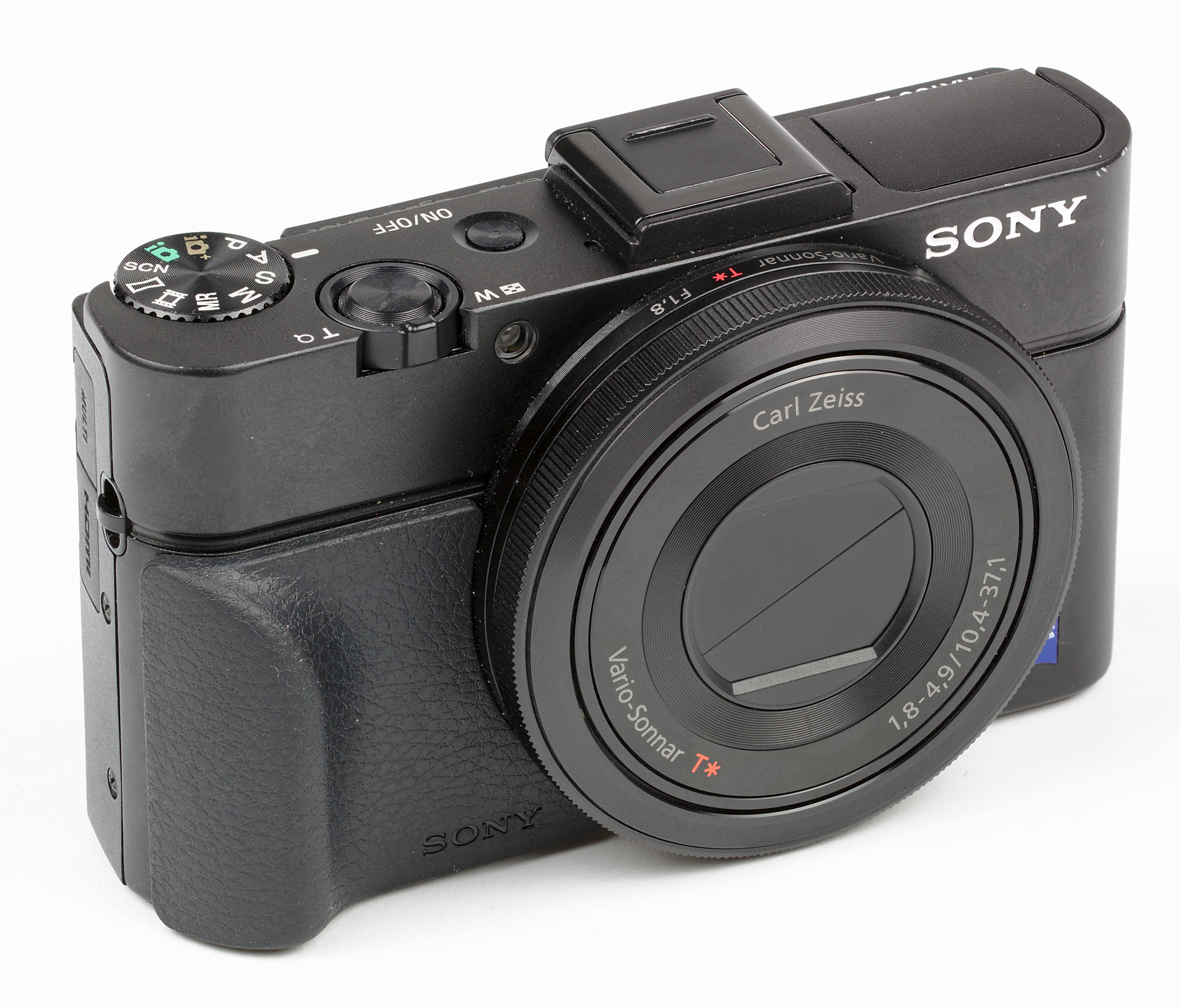
RX100 II with mounted grip

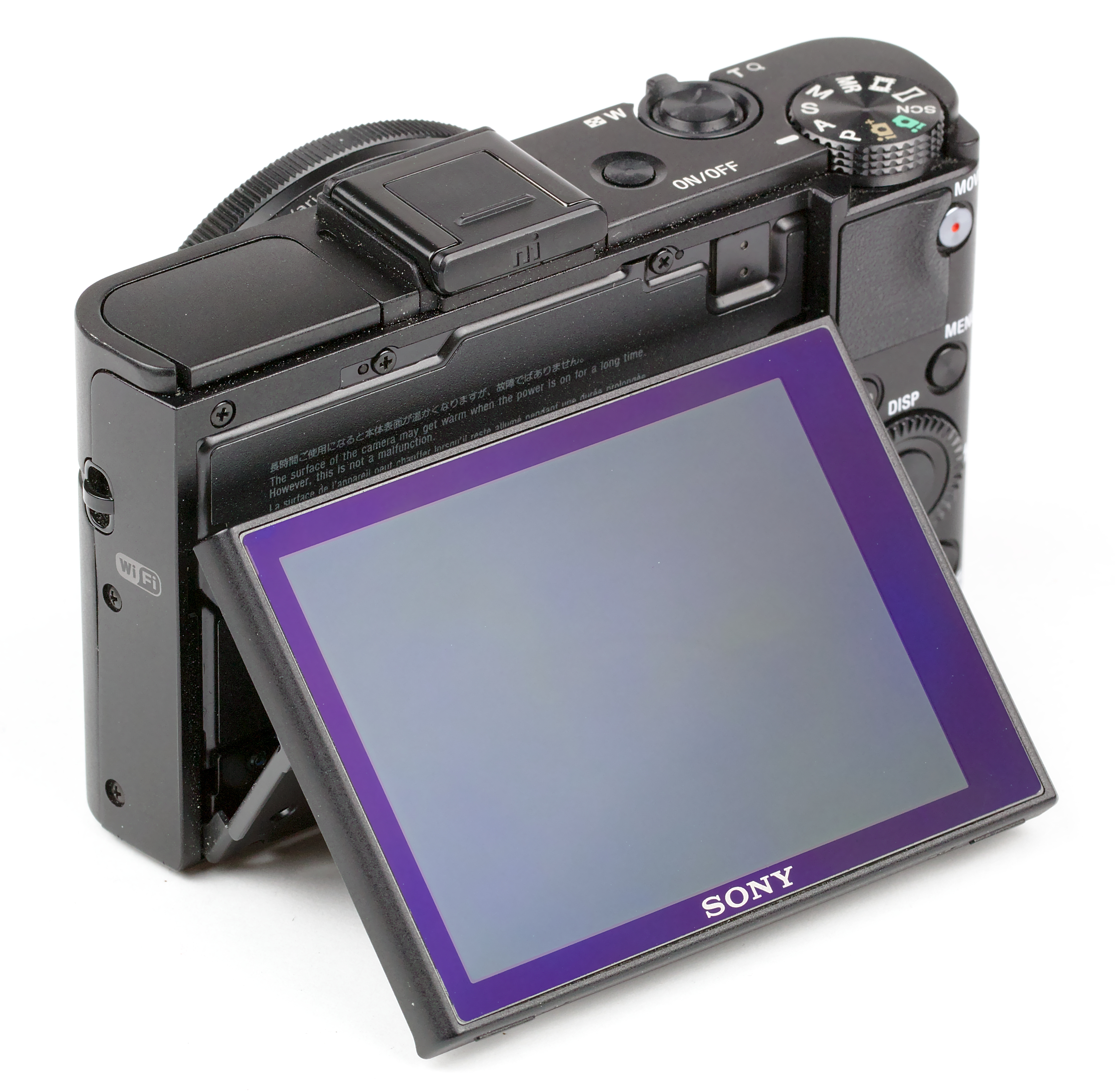

== Hasselblad Stellar and Stellar II ==
On 23 July 2013, Swedish luxury camera manufacturer Hasselblad announced the 'Stellar', a compact camera based on the DSC-RX100, incorporating a wooden or carbon grip. On 1 November 2013, Hasselblad announced another three cosmetic variants of the camera, named the Stellar Special Edition. On 26 November 2014, Hasselblad announced the Stellar II based on the DSC-RX100 II.

== Cyber-shot DSC-RX100 III ==
The Cyber-shot DSC-RX100 III was released in June 2014. The camera had a new Bionz X processor, as used in the Sony Alpha 77 II, and a new Zeiss Vario-Sonnar T* lens (24-70mm (35mm equivalent), f/1.8-2.8) giving a wider angle of view (while curtailing the maximum equivalent focal length from 100mm to 70mm). Unlike its predecessor, the RX100 II, it does not have Sony's multi-interface hotshoe (limiting flash photography to the small built-in unit), but includes a pop-up OLED electronic viewfinder (EVF). The DSC-RX100 III has customizable functions. The viewfinder and rear LCD can be set to different displays. The RX100 III can be set manually with shutter speed and aperture fixed, but with Auto ISO (sensitivity) giving the correct metered exposure.

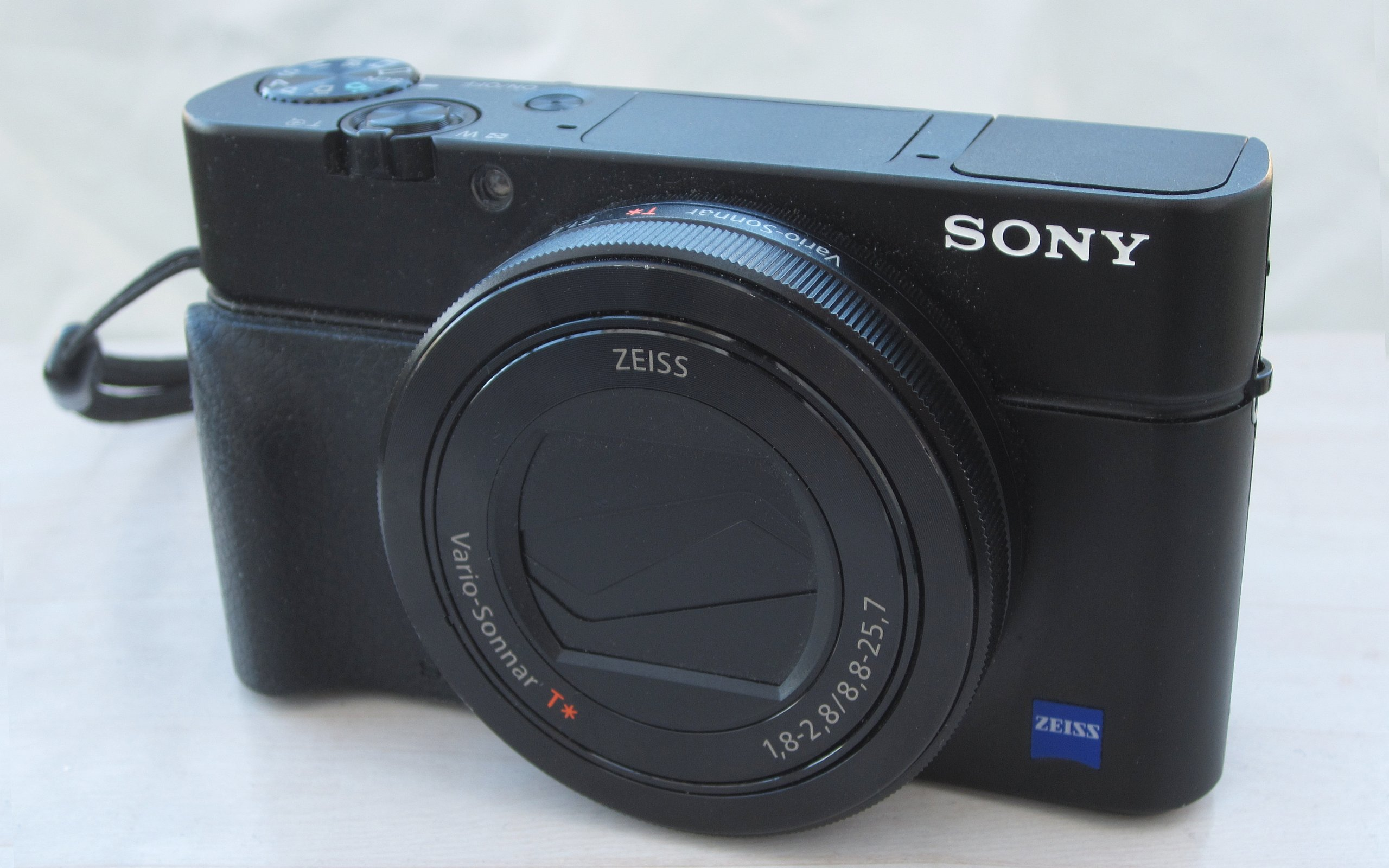
RX100 Mark III with attachment grip

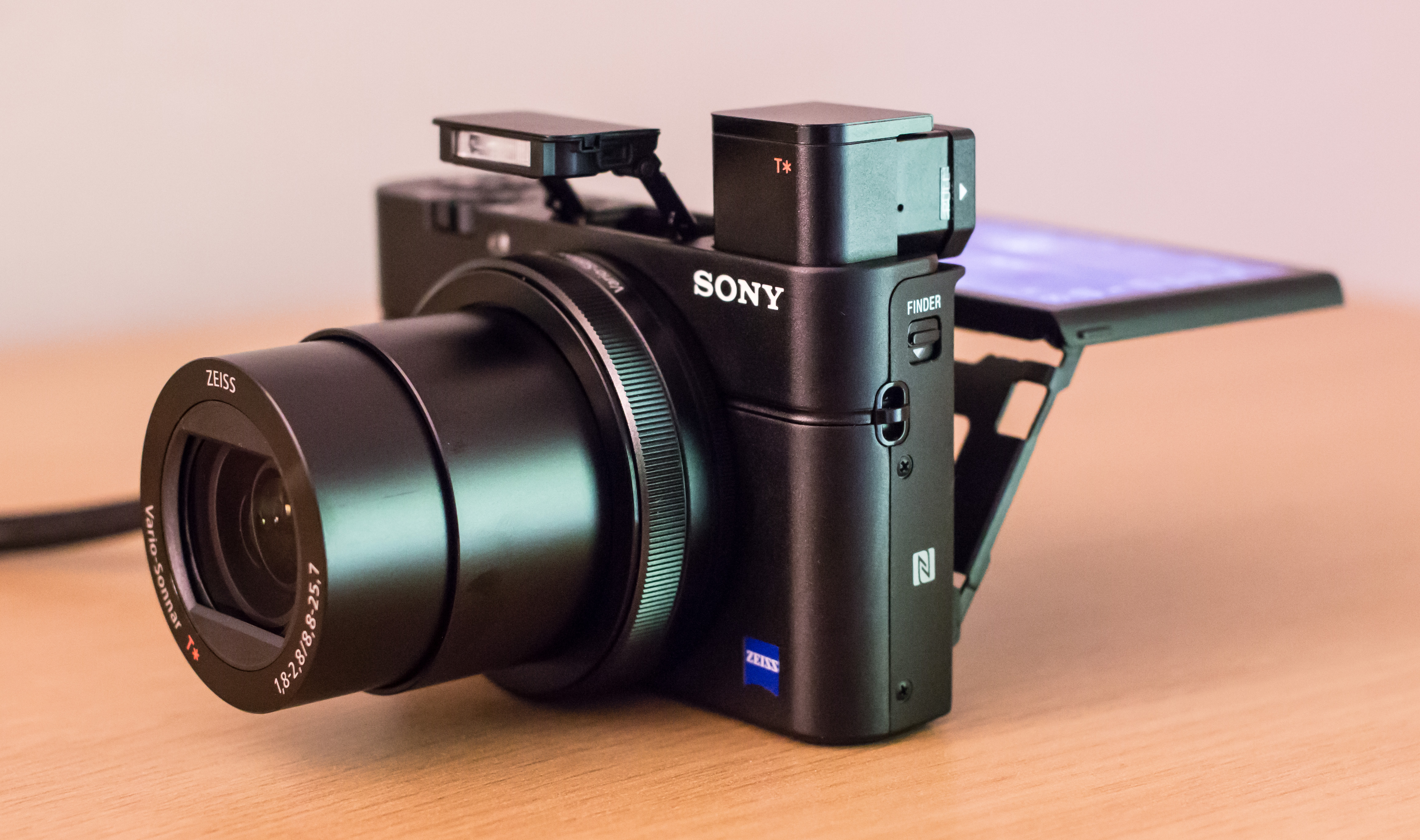
A DSC-RX100 III camera showing the extended positions of the lens, flash, electronic viewfinder, and LCD panel

== Cyber-shot DSC-RX100 IV ==
In June 2015, Sony released the Cyber-shot DSC-RX100 IV. Like its predecessors, it has the same 1.0-type ("1-inch") 20.2 megapixel CMOS sensor and ISO up to 12800. The RX-100 IV can now record 4K video in XAVC-S format with frame rates up to 24, 25, and 30 fps. However, due to extreme write speed and processing power, it can only record 5-minute 4K shots to prevent any serious damage to the camera. It also features Slow-mo video recording and can capture up to 960 fps for NTSC mode and 1000 fps for PAL mode.

== Cyber-shot DSC-RX100 V ==
On 6 October 2016, Sony announced the RX100 V. In this update, Sony improved the performance of the camera claiming the world's fastest auto focus, the world's most auto focus points, and the world's fastest continuous shooting for a compact fixed-lens camera. Sony's claim of fastest auto focusing speed is that the camera can lock in focus in as little as .05 seconds. Sony increased the number of focus points taken per shot to 315, and also improved continuous shooting performance enabling up to 150 continuous shots to be taken at the full 20.1 megapixels at 24 frames per second.

Following the release of the RX100 VI, an updated version of the RX100 V called the RX100 VA was released with improvements such as an increased buffer and processor.

== Cyber-shot DSC-RX100 VI ==
On 5 June 2018, Sony announced the RX100 VI. In this iteration, Sony introduced a new ZEISS Vario-Sonnar T* 24-200mm^{i} f/2.8 – f/4.5 zoom lens. In addition, Sony once again improved the auto focus performance, improving the auto focus speed to .03 seconds. Other performance improvements in continuous shooting and 4K motion video were also made.

== Cyber-shot DSC-RX100 VII ==
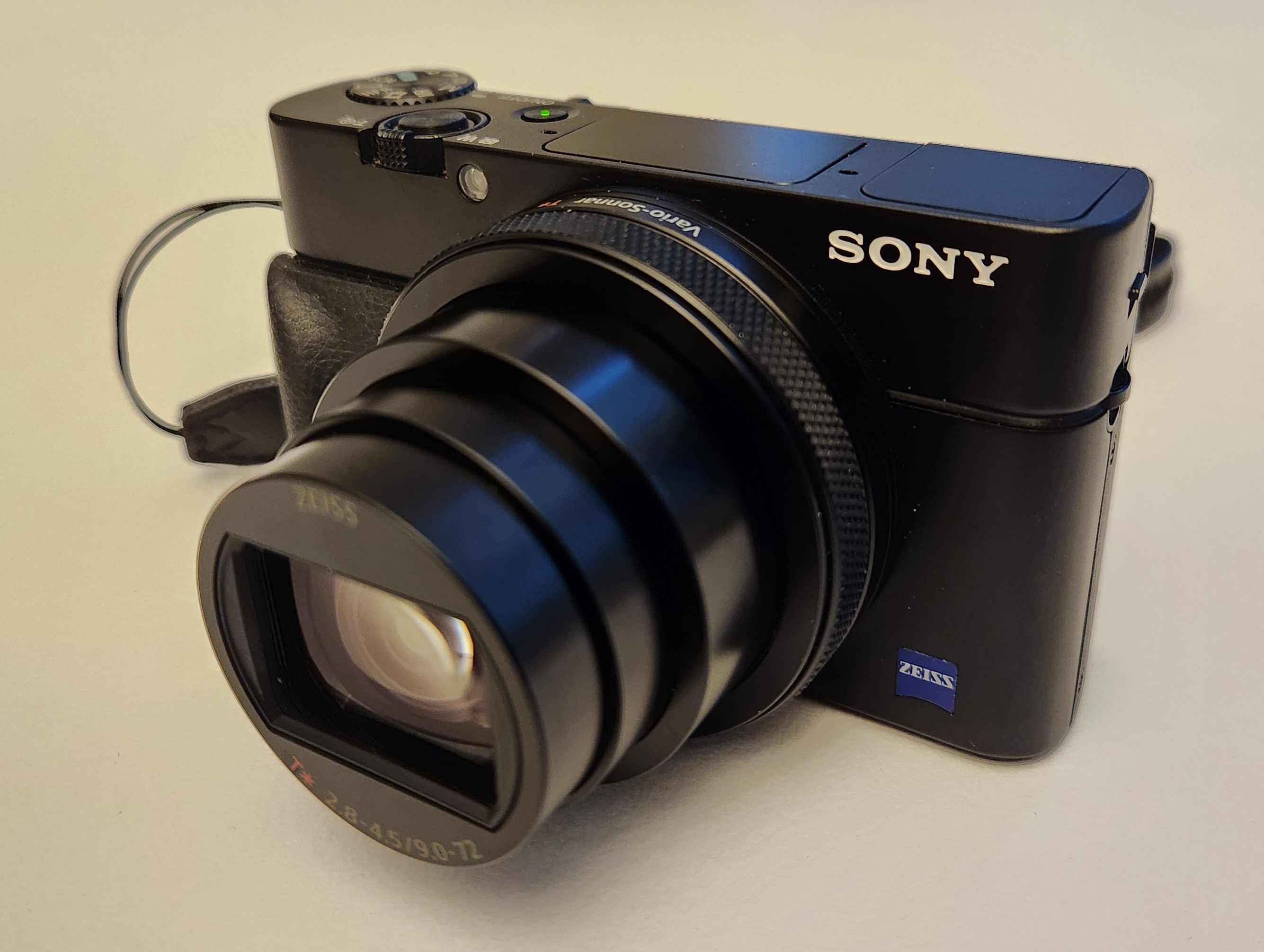
RX100 Mark VII

On 25 July 2019, Sony announced the RX100 VII. New features include unlimited video duration (previously 30 min), a 3.5mm TRS stereo mini jack for connecting an external microphone (previously none), and enhanced autofocus.

== Model comparison ==
Model	RX100	RX100 II	RX100 III	RX100 IV	RX100 V	RX100 VI	RX100 VII
Announced	6 Jun 2012	27 Jun 2013	28 May 2014	10 Jun 2015	6 Oct 2016	5 June 2018	25 Jul 2019
Sensor	20.1Mpx Exmor CMOS; 13.2mm x 8.8mm	20.1Mpx Exmor R BSI-CMOS; 13.2mm x 8.8mm		20.1Mpx Exmor RS; Stacked BSI-CMOS; 13.2mm x 8.8mm			
Processor	Bionz		Bionz X				
Lens focal length	10.4 – 37.1mm (Equiv. 28 – 100mm, f/4.8 – 13.2)		8.8 – 25.7mm (Equiv. 24 – 70mm, f/4.8 – 7.6)			9.0 – 72mm (Equiv. 24 – 200mm, f/7.6 – 12.2)	
Lens max aperture	f/1.8 – 4.9		f/1.8 – 2.8			f/2.8 – 4.5	
Shutter speed	30 ~ 1/2000 sec			30 ~ 1/32000 sec			
Max continuous shooting	10 frames/s			16 frames/s	24 frames/s		20 frames/s
Video record format	MPEG-4, AVCHD (28 Mbit/s); Full HD		MPEG-4, AVCHD (28 Mbit/s), XAVC S (50 Mbit/s) Full HD	MPEG-4, AVCHD (28 Mbit/s), XAVC S (100 Mbit/s) 4K video			
Video duration limit	30 min (RX 100 IV, V and VI: 30 min Full HD, 5 min 4k)						781 min
Video sampling	Line skipping		Full-pixel readout				
Slow motion video	No			Yes (240, 480, 960fps)		Yes (250, 500, 1000fps)	
Professional video edit	No			Picture Profile w/CineGamma, Timecode, Userbit			
Custom minimum shutter speed at Auto ISO	No			Yes			
AF points	25				315		357
AF type	Contrast Detect				Phase Detect		
Flexible spot with lock on AF	No			Yes			
Continuous eye-AF	No			Yes			
LCD	3 inch fixed	3 inch tilting (+90/-40 deg.)	3 inch tilting (+180/-45 deg.)			3 inch tilting (+180/-90 deg.)	
EVF	No	Optional	Built-in				
Hot shoe	No	Multi-Interface	No				
Built-in ND filter	No		3-stops			No	
Microphone input	No						Yes
WiFi and NFC	No	Yes					
Battery-life (CIPA standards)	330 shots	350 shots	320 shots	280 shots	220 shots	240 shots	260 shots
Weight	240g	281g	290g	298g	299g	301g	302g
Dimensions	102 x 58 x 36 mm	102 x 58 x 38 mm	102 x 58 x 41 mm				102 x 58 x 43 mm

== See also ==
- Sony ZV-1
- List of large sensor fixed-lens cameras
- List of superzoom compact cameras
