= Sony Cyber-shot DSC-QX30 =

Digital camera model

Overview
- Maker: Sony
- Type: Lens-style Compact Camera

Lens
- Lens: Sony G Lens (24 - 720 mm equivalent)
- F-numbers: f/3.5 (wide) - f/6.3 (telephoto)

Sensor/medium
- Sensor: Sony Exmor R™
- Sensor type: Backside-Illuminated (BSI) CMOS
- Sensor size: 6.17 x 4.55 mm (1/2.3 inch)
- Sensor maker: Sony
- Maximum resolution: 5184 x 3888 (20.4 megapixels)
- Film speed: ISO 80 - 3200
- Recording medium: microSD, microSDHC, microSDXC, MemoryStick Micro card; hybrid slot

Shutter
- Shutter speeds: 4s to 1/1600s
- Continuous shooting: 10 frames per second

Image processing
- Image processor: Sony Bionz X™
- White balance: No

General
- Battery: Rechargeable & removable Lithium-Ion battery pack (NP-BN)
- Dimensions: 68 x 65 x 58 mm (2.68 x 2.56 x 2.28 inches)
- Weight: 178 g (6 oz) (body only); 193 g (With battery and media)

The Sony Cyber-shot DSC-QX30 is an ultrazoom, mobile device-mountable, lens-style compact camera manufactured by Sony. Announced on September 3, 2014, the QX30 is one of Sony's "Smart Lens" cameras, alongside the QX1, QX10 and QX100, that are designed to be specifically used with a smartphone. It has a 1/2.3 inch backside-illuminated Exmor R™ CMOS sensor with 20.4 effective megapixels, sitting behind an ƒ/3.5 (wide) to ƒ/6.3 (telephoto) Sony G Lens. Its highlight feature is its 30x lossless optical zoom.

Like the other Sony Smart Lens cameras, it is Wi-Fi-controlled using an Android or iOS device though the downloadable Sony Imaging Edge (formerly PlayMemories) Mobile application, utilizing the device's screen as its viewfinder and camera controls, while also serving as additional storage medium via its integrated wireless file transfer feature.

== Specifications ==
=== Technical specifications ===
Sensor	
Sensor Type	1/2.3 inch (7.82 mm) Exmor R™ CMOS sensor, 4:3 aspect ratio
Number of Pixel (Effective)	Approx. 20.4 Megapixels
Number of Pixel (Gross)	Approx. 21.1 Megapixels
Lens	
Lens Type	Sony G Lens, 11 elements in 10 groups (including 5 aspheric elements)
F Number (max. aperture)	ƒ/3.5 (W) – 6.3 (T)
Focal Length	f= 4.3–129 mm
Focus Range (from the front of Lens)	AF approx. 5 cm to infinity (W), approx. 200 cm to infinity (T)
Optical Zoom	30x lossless
Clear Image Zoom (Still Image)	Still images: 20M approx. 60x 10M approx. 85x 5M approx. 120x 0.3M approx. 486x 15M (16:9) approx. 60x 2M (16:9) approx. 162x Movies: approx. 60x
Aperture Type	Iris diaphragm (5 blades)
Focal Length (f= 35 mm format equivalent)	Still images (3:2) f= 25 – 750 mm Still images (4:3) f= 24 – 720 mm Still images (16:9) f= 26 – 780 mm Still images (1:1) f= 28.5 – 855 mm Movie (16:9) f= 26.5 – 1080 mm (SteadyShot Active Mode)
LCD	
Screen Type	Segment LCD
Camera	
Image Processing Engine	BIONZ X™
SteadyShot	Still Images: Optical; Movies: Optical type with electronic compensation
Focus Mode	Single-shot AF; Touch AF; Lock on AF; Multi Point AF
Focus Area	Multi Point AF
Light Metering Mode	Multi Pattern
Exposure Compensation	+/-2.0 EV, 1/3 EV step
ISO Sensitivity (Still Images)	ISO 80 - 3200 (iAuto); ISO 80 - 12800 (Superior Auto); Auto / 80 / 100 / 200 / 400 / 800 / 1600 / 3200 (Program Auto); Auto / 80 / 100 / 200 / 400 / 800 / 1600 / 3200 (Aperture Priority); Auto / 80 / 100 / 200 / 400 / 800 / 1600 / 3200 (Shutter Priority)
ISO Sensitivity (Movie)	Auto (ISO 80 - 1000 equivalent)
Minimum Illumination (Movie)	Auto: 10 lux (Shutter Speed 1/15)
White Balance Modes	Auto; Daylight; Cloudy; Incandescent; Fluorescent (Cool White); Fluorescent (Day White); Fluorescent (Daylight)
Shutter Speed	iAuto (4 – 1/1600); Program Auto (1 – 1/1600); Aperture Priority (8 – 1/1600); Shutter Priority (30 – 1/1600)
Aperture	iAuto (ƒ/3.5 - ƒ/6.3 (W)); Program Auto (ƒ/3.5 - ƒ/6.3 (W)); Aperture Priority (ƒ/3.5 - ƒ/8.0 (W)); Shutter Priority (ƒ/3.5 - ƒ/6.3 (W))
Image Control	Quality (Fine/Standard)
Dynamic Range Functions	Dynamic Range Optimizer
Shooting Modes	Intelligent Auto; Superior Auto; Program Auto; Aperture Priority Mode; Shutter Speed Priority Mode; Movie
Max. Continuous Shooting Speed (with max. recording pixel)	Approx. 10 fps (for up to 10 shots)
Self Timer	2 – 10 seconds delay
Movie Mode	Single, Continuous Shooting
Shooting Functions	Face Detection
Number of Recording Scenes	Still images: Superior Auto - 44, Intelligent Auto - 33; Movie: 44
Recording	
Compatible Recording Media	Memory Stick Micro™ Memory Stick Micro™ (Mark 2) microSD Memory Card microSDHC Memory Card microSDXC Memory Card
Recording Format	Still images: JPEG (DCF Ver. 2.0, Exif Ver. 2.3, MRF Baseline compliant); Movie: MPEG-4; Movie audio: MPEG-4, AAC-LC (2-channels)
Colour Space/Format	Still Image: sRGB; Movie: NTSC
Recording Resolutions	Still Images; 3:2 mode: 18M (5,184 x 3,456); 8.9M (3,648 x 2,432); 4.5M (2,592 x 1,728); 4:3 mode: 20M (5,184 x 3,888); 10M (3,648 x 2,736); 5M (2,592 x 1,944); 0.3M (640 x 480); 16:9 mode: 15M (5,184 x 2,920); 7.5M (3,648 x 2,056); 2.1M (1,920 x 1,080); 1:1 mode: 15M (3,888 x 3,888); 7.5M (2,736 x 2,736); 3.7M (1,920 x 1,920) Movies; MP4: 28M PS (1,920 x 1080 at 60 fps); 16M HQ (1,920 x 1080 at 30 fps)
Interface	
Input And Output Terminals	Multi/Micro USB Terminal, Hi-Speed USB (USB 2.0)
Connectivity	
Wi-Fi®	Yes, Wi-Fi® Connect
NFC® One-touch functionality	Yes (NFC forum Type 3 Tag compatible)
Power	
Power Source	DC 3.6 V (supplied battery); DC 5.0 V (AC adapter)
Battery System	Rechargeable Battery Pack (Lithium-Ion)
Power Consumption (Camera Mode)	Approx. 1.4 W
USB Charging	Yes
USB Power Mode	Yes
Battery Life	(CIPA) Approx. 200 shots, approx. 100 min
Supplied Battery Pack	Sony Rechargeable Battery Pack (NP-BN)
Others	
Operating Temperature	Approx. 0 °C to 40 °C (32 °F to 104 °F)
Dimensions (W x H x D)	68.4 x 65.1 x 57.6 mm
Weight	Approx. 178 g (body only); Approx. 193 g (with battery and media storage)

== See also ==
- Sony QX series
- Sony Cyber-shot
- Sony DSC-QX10
- Sony DSC-QX100
- List of superzoom compact cameras

Family	Level	Format	'10	2011		2012	2013	2014	2015	2016	2017	2018	2019	2020	2021	2022	2023	2024	2025	2026
Alpha (α)	Indust	FF																ILX-LR1 ^{●}		
Alpha (α)	Cine line	FF													_{m} FX6 ^{●}					
Alpha (α)	Cine line	FF													_{m} FX3 ^{AT●}					
Alpha (α)	Cine line	FF																		_{m} FX2 ^{AT●}
Alpha (α)	Flag	FF													_{m} α1 ^{FT●}				_{m} α1 II ^{FAT●}	
Alpha (α)	Speed	FF										_{m} α9 ^{FT●}			_{m} α9 II ^{FT●}				_{m} α9 III ^{FAT●}	
Alpha (α)	Sens	FF							_{m} α7S ^{●}	_{m} α7S II ^{F●}					_{m} α7S III ^{AT●}					
Alpha (α)	Hi-Res	FF						_{m} α7R ^{●}		_{m} α7R II ^{F●}		_{m} α7R III ^{FT●}		_{m} α7R IV ^{FT●}			_{m} α7R V ^{FAT●}			
Alpha (α)	Basic	FF						_{m} α7 ^{F●}	_{m} α7 II ^{F●}				_{m} α7 III ^{FT●}			_{m} α7 IV ^{AT●}				
Alpha (α)	Compact	FF																_{m} α7CR ^{AT●}		
Alpha (α)	Compact	FF													_{m} α7C ^{AT●}			_{m} α7C II ^{AT●}		
Alpha (α)	Vlog	FF																_{m} ZV-E1 ^{AT●}		
Alpha (α)	Cine	APS-C															_{m} FX30 ^{AT●}			
Alpha (α)	Adv	APS-C			_{s} NEX-7 ^{F●}						_{m} α6500 ^{FT●}			_{m} α6600 ^{FT●}				_{m} α6700 ^{AT●}		
Alpha (α)	Mid-range	APS-C				_{m} NEX-6 ^{F●}					_{m} α6300 ^{F●}		_{m} α6400 ^{F+T●}							
Alpha (α)	Mid-range	APS-C						_{m} α6000 ^{F●}						_{m} α6100 ^{FT●}						
Alpha (α)	Vlog	APS-C														_{m} ZV-E10 ^{AT●}			_{m} ZV-E10 II ^{AT●}	
Alpha (α)	Entry-level	APS-C	NEX-5 ^{F●}	NEX-5N ^{FT●}		NEX-5R ^{F+T●}	NEX-5T ^{F+T●}		α5100 ^{F+T●}											
Alpha (α)	Entry-level	APS-C	NEX-3 ^{F●}	NEX-C3 ^{F●}		NEX-F3 ^{F+●}	NEX-3N ^{F+●}	α5000 ^{F+●}												
DSLR-style		APS-C					_{m} α3000 ^{●}		_{m} α3500 ^{●}											
SmartShot		APS-C							QX1 ^{M●}											
CineAlta	Cine line	FF										VENICE				VENICE 2				
CineAlta	Cine line	FF																BURANO		
XDCAM	Cine line	FF												_{m} FX9						
XDCAM	Docu	S35							_{m} FS7		_{m} FS7 II									
XDCAM	Mobile	S35								_{m} FS5			_{m} FS5 II							
NXCAM	Pro	S35		NEX-FS100		NEX-FS700	NEX-FS700R													
NXCAM	APS-C					NEX-EA50														
Handycam	FF					_{m} NEX-VG900														
Handycam	APS-C		_{s} NEX-VG10		_{s} NEX-VG20	_{m} NEX-VG30														
Security		FF									SNC-VB770									
Security		FF									UMC-S3C									
Family	Level	Format																		
Family	Level	Format	'10	2011		2012	2013	2014	2015	2016	2017	2018	2019	2020	2021	2022	2023	2024	2025	2026
