= Sony Cyber-shot DSC-QX100 =

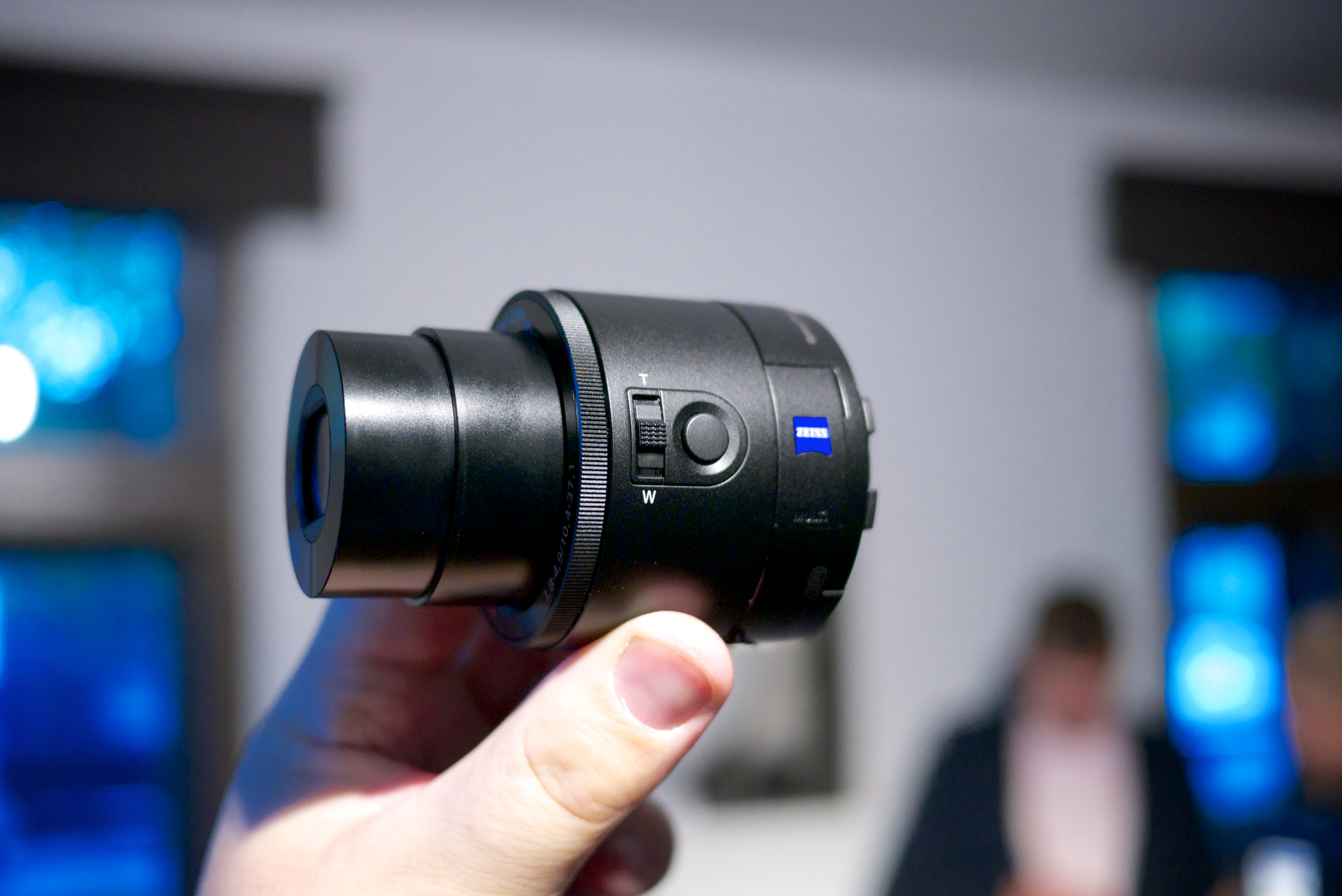

Overview
- Maker: Sony
- Type: Lens-style Compact Camera

Lens
- Lens: Carl Zeiss Vario-Sonnar T* (28–100 mm equivalent)
- F-numbers: ƒ/1.8 to ƒ/4.9

Sensor/medium
- Sensor: Sony Exmor R
- Sensor type: Backside-Illuminated (BSI) CMOS
- Sensor size: 13.2 x 8.8mm (1.0 inch type)
- Sensor maker: Sony
- Maximum resolution: 5184 x 3888 (20.2 megapixels)
- Film speed: ISO 160–6400
- Recording medium: One microSD, microSDHC, microSDXC, or MemoryStick Micro card

Shutter
- Shutter speeds: 4s to 1/1600s
- Continuous shooting: 10 frames per second

Image processing
- Image processor: Bionz image processor
- White balance: No

General
- Dimensions: 63 x 63 x 56mm (2.46 x 2.46 x 2.19 inches)
- Weight: 179 g (6 oz) including battery

The Sony Cyber-shot DSC-QX100 is a mobile device-mountable lens-style compact camera manufactured by Sony. Announced on September 3, 2014, the QX100 is one of Sony's "Smart Lens" cameras, alongside the QX1, QX10 and QX30, that are specifically designed to be used with a smartphone. Its highlight features are its 1-inch (13.2 x 8.8 mm) backside-illuminated Exmor R CMOS sensor, with 20.2 megapixels, ƒ/1.8 to ƒ/4.9 Carl ZEISS® Vario-Sonnar T* lens and a 3.6x (28–100 mm) optical zoom, all taken straight from the Sony RX100 II premium compact camera.

Like the other Sony Smart Lens cameras, it is Wi-Fi-controlled using an Android or iOS device though the downloadable Imaging Edge (formerly PlayMemories) Mobile application, utilizing the device's screen as its viewfinder and camera controls while also serving as additional storage medium via its integrated wireless file transfer feature.

== Specifications ==
=== Technical specifications ===
Sensor	
Sensor Type	1.0 inch (13.2 x 8.8 mm) Exmor R CMOS sensor, 3:2 aspect ratio
Number of Pixel (Effective)	Approx. 20.2 Megapixels
Number of Pixel (Gross)	Approx. 20.9 Megapixels
Lens	
Lens Type	Carl ZEISS® Vario-Sonnar T*, 7 elements in 6 groups (4 aspheric elements including AA lens)
F Number (max. Aperture)	f/1.8 (W) to f/4.9 (T)
Focal Length	f=10.7–37.1 mm
Focus Range (from the front of Lens)	AF approx. 5 cm to infinity (W), approx. 55 cm to infinity (T)
Optical Zoom	3.6x lossless
Digital Zoom	N/A
Aperture Type	Iris diaphragm (7 blades)
Focal Length (f=35mm format equivalent)	Still images (3:2) f=28–100 mm Still images (4:3) f=30–1008 mm Still images (16:9) f= 29–105 mm Still images (1:1) f= 36–127 mm Movie (16:9) f= 33–120 mm (SteadyShot Active Mode)
LCD	
Screen Type	Segment LCD
Camera	
Image Processing Engine	BIONZ
Steadyshot	Still Images: Optical; Movies: Active Mode, Optical type with electronic compensation
Focus Mode	Single-shot AF; Touch AF; Manual Focus; Multi Point AF
Focus Area	Multi Point AF
Light Metering Mode	Multi Pattern
Exposure Compensation	+/-3.0 EV, 1/3 EV step
ISO Sensitivity(Still Images)	ISO 160–6400 (iAuto); ISO 160–25600 (Superior Auto); Auto / 160 / 200 / 400 / 800 / 1600 / 3200 / 6400 / 12800 (Program Auto); Auto / 160 / 200 / 400 / 800 / 1600 / 3200 / 6400 / 12800 (Aperture Priority); Auto / 160 / 200 / 400 / 800 / 1600 / 3200 / 6400 / 12800 (Shutter Priority)
ISO Sensitivity (Movie)	Auto (ISO 160–3200 equivalent)
Minimum Illumination (Movie)	Auto: 3.2 lux (Shutter Speed 1/60)
White Balance Modes	Auto; Daylight; Shade; Cloudy; Incandescent; Fluorescent (Warm White); Fluorescent (Cool White); Fluorescent (Day White); Fluorescent (Daylight); C. Temp.
Shutter Speed	Auto (4–1/2000); Program Auto (1–1/2000); Aperture Priority (8–1/2000); Shutter Priority (30–1/2000)
Aperture	iAuto (f/1.8 – f/11); Program Auto (f/1.8 – f/11), Aperture Priority (f/1.8 – f/11); Shutter Priority (f/1.8 – f/11)
Image Control	Quality (Fine, Standard)
Dynamic Range Functions	Dynamic Range Optimizer
Shooting Modes	Intelligent Auto; Superior Auto; Aperture Priority; Shutter Speed Priority; Program Auto; Movie
Max. Continuous Shooting Speed (with max. recording pixel)	N/A
Self Timer	2–10 sec. delay
Movie Mode	Single
Shooting Functions	Face Detection
Number of Recording Scenes	Still images: 33; Movie: 44
Recording	
Compatible Recording Media	Memory Stick Micro; Memory Stick Micro (Mark 2) microSD Memory Card microSDHC Memory Card microSDXC Memory Card
Recording Format	Still images: JPEG; Movies: MP4
Colour Space/Format	Still Image: sRGB; Movies Mode: NTSC
Recording Resolutions	Still Image: 3:2 mode: 20 MP (5472 x 3648); 5 MP (2736 x 1824) 4:3 mode: 18 M (4864 x 3648); 5 MP (2592 x 1944) 16:9 mode: 17 MP (5472 x 3080); 4.2 MP (2720 x 1528) 1:1 mode: 13 MP (3648 x 3648); 3.7 MP (1920 x 1920) Movies: MP4; 16 MP (1,920 x 1080 at 30 fps)
Interface	
Input And Output Terminals	Multi/Micro USB Terminal, Hi-Speed USB (USB 2.0)
NFC® One-touch functionality	Yes (NFC forum Type 3 Tag compatible)
Wi-Fi®	Yes, Wi-Fi® Connect
Power	
Power Source	DC 3.6 V (Supplied battery); DC 5.0 V (AC adapter)
Battery System	Rechargeable Battery Pack (Lithium-Ion)
Power Consumption (Camera Mode)	Approx. 1.1 W
USB Charging	Yes
USB Power Mode	Yes
Battery Life	(CIPA) Approx. 220, approx. 110min
Supplied Battery Pack	Sony Rechargeable Battery Pack (NP-BN)
Others	
Operating Temperature	Approx. 0 °C to 40 °C (32 °F to 104 °F)
Dimensions (W x H x D)	63 x 63 x 56 mm (2.46 x 2.46 x 2.19 in)
Weight (with battery and media storage)	179 g (0.39 lb / 6.31 oz)

== See also ==
- Sony QX series
- Sony Cyber-shot
- Sony DSC-QX10
- Sony DSC-QX30
- List of large sensor fixed-lens cameras

Family	Level	Format	'10	2011		2012	2013	2014	2015	2016	2017	2018	2019	2020	2021	2022	2023	2024	2025	2026
Alpha (α)	Indust	FF																ILX-LR1 ^{●}		
Alpha (α)	Cine line	FF													_{m} FX6 ^{●}					
Alpha (α)	Cine line	FF													_{m} FX3 ^{AT●}					
Alpha (α)	Cine line	FF																		_{m} FX2 ^{AT●}
Alpha (α)	Flag	FF													_{m} α1 ^{FT●}				_{m} α1 II ^{FAT●}	
Alpha (α)	Speed	FF										_{m} α9 ^{FT●}			_{m} α9 II ^{FT●}				_{m} α9 III ^{FAT●}	
Alpha (α)	Sens	FF							_{m} α7S ^{●}	_{m} α7S II ^{F●}					_{m} α7S III ^{AT●}					
Alpha (α)	Hi-Res	FF						_{m} α7R ^{●}		_{m} α7R II ^{F●}		_{m} α7R III ^{FT●}		_{m} α7R IV ^{FT●}			_{m} α7R V ^{FAT●}			
Alpha (α)	Basic	FF						_{m} α7 ^{F●}	_{m} α7 II ^{F●}				_{m} α7 III ^{FT●}			_{m} α7 IV ^{AT●}				_{m} α7 V ^{FAT●}
Alpha (α)	Compact	FF																_{m} α7CR ^{AT●}		
Alpha (α)	Compact	FF													_{m} α7C ^{AT●}			_{m} α7C II ^{AT●}		
Alpha (α)	Vlog	FF																_{m} ZV-E1 ^{AT●}		
Alpha (α)	Cine	APS-C															_{m} FX30 ^{AT●}			
Alpha (α)	Adv	APS-C			_{s} NEX-7 ^{F●}						_{m} α6500 ^{FT●}			_{m} α6600 ^{FT●}				_{m} α6700 ^{AT●}		
Alpha (α)	Mid-range	APS-C				_{m} NEX-6 ^{F●}					_{m} α6300 ^{F●}		_{m} α6400 ^{F+T●}							
Alpha (α)	Mid-range	APS-C						_{m} α6000 ^{F●}						_{m} α6100 ^{FT●}						
Alpha (α)	Vlog	APS-C														_{m} ZV-E10 ^{AT●}			_{m} ZV-E10 II ^{AT●}	
Alpha (α)	Entry-level	APS-C	NEX-5 ^{F●}	NEX-5N ^{FT●}		NEX-5R ^{F+T●}	NEX-5T ^{F+T●}		α5100 ^{F+T●}											
Alpha (α)	Entry-level	APS-C	NEX-3 ^{F●}	NEX-C3 ^{F●}		NEX-F3 ^{F+●}	NEX-3N ^{F+●}	α5000 ^{F+●}												
DSLR-style		APS-C					_{m} α3000 ^{●}		_{m} α3500 ^{●}											
SmartShot		APS-C							QX1 ^{M●}											
CineAlta	Cine line	FF										VENICE				VENICE 2				
CineAlta	Cine line	FF																BURANO		
XDCAM	Cine line	FF												_{m} FX9						
XDCAM	Docu	S35							_{m} FS7		_{m} FS7 II									
XDCAM	Mobile	S35								_{m} FS5			_{m} FS5 II							
NXCAM	Pro	S35		NEX-FS100		NEX-FS700	NEX-FS700R													
NXCAM	APS-C					NEX-EA50														
Handycam	FF					_{m} NEX-VG900														
Handycam	APS-C		_{s} NEX-VG10		_{s} NEX-VG20	_{m} NEX-VG30														
Security		FF									SNC-VB770									
Security		FF									UMC-S3C									
Family	Level	Format																		
Family	Level	Format	'10	2011		2012	2013	2014	2015	2016	2017	2018	2019	2020	2021	2022	2023	2024	2025	2026
