= Pocket Operators =

Affordable synthesizer series

Pocket Operator
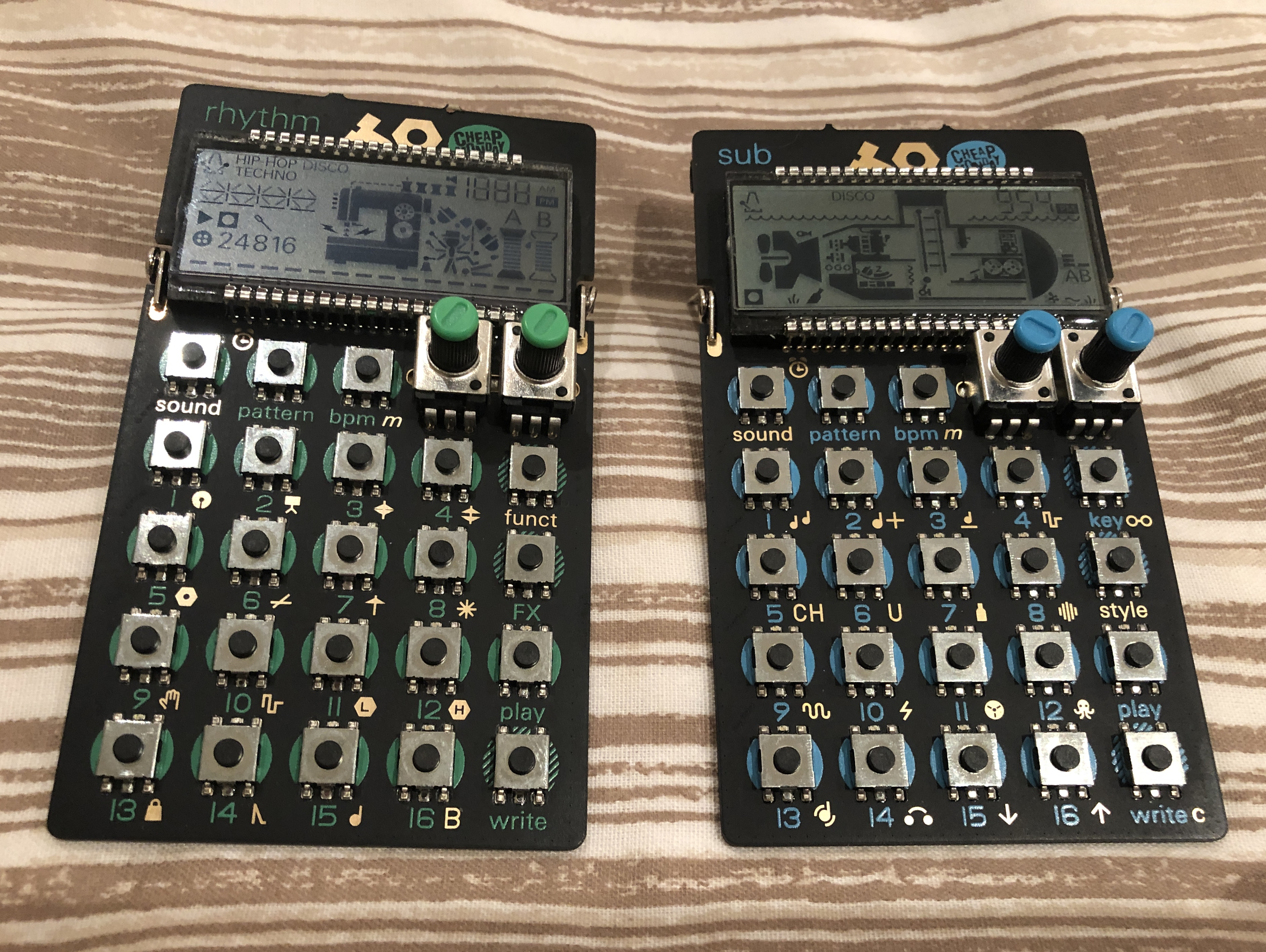
- Two Pocket Operators
- Manufacturer: Teenage Engineering

Technical specifications
- Timbrality: Multitimbral
- Synthesis type: Digital synthesis
- Storage memory: 16 pattern slots
- Effects: 16 punch-in effects

Input/output
- Keyboard: 4 × 4 button matrix
- External control: CV in/out/thru

Pocket Operators are a line of miniature synthesizers, drum machines and grooveboxes, produced by the Swedish company Teenage Engineering. They were originally released in 2015 as a collaborative effort with the clothing brand Cheap Monday. They are inexpensive, with all main line models retailing for under $100. As of 2022, there are nine models in the main series, along with four limited edition models and an app. They use custom segmented liquid crystal displays.

== Overview ==
Pocket Operators are made by the Swedish music technology manufacturer Teenage Engineering. They are known for their costly products like the OP-1, so the announcement of the Pocket Operator was a surprise to the music industry. The series was a collaboration with the Swedish clothing brand Cheap Monday until their closure in 2018, with Teenage Engineering continuing the series after the collaboration ended.

Each Pocket Operator has an identification number that tells you which series it is from. The number is chronological, with the PO-10 series being the oldest. Limited edition releases are all numbered over 100.

All Pocket Operators share the same design, consisting of a bare PCB with a stand, 23 buttons, 2 dials and a screen. They are powered by AAA batteries. All models have a 16-step sequencer of sorts, with 16 pattern slots. Patterns can be chained to create longer songs. Some models can also play live using the buttons as a keyboard. There is also a section of 16 effects that can be applied on each model. The screen of each model is different and displays a built-in alarm clock.

== Main series ==
=== PO-10 series ===
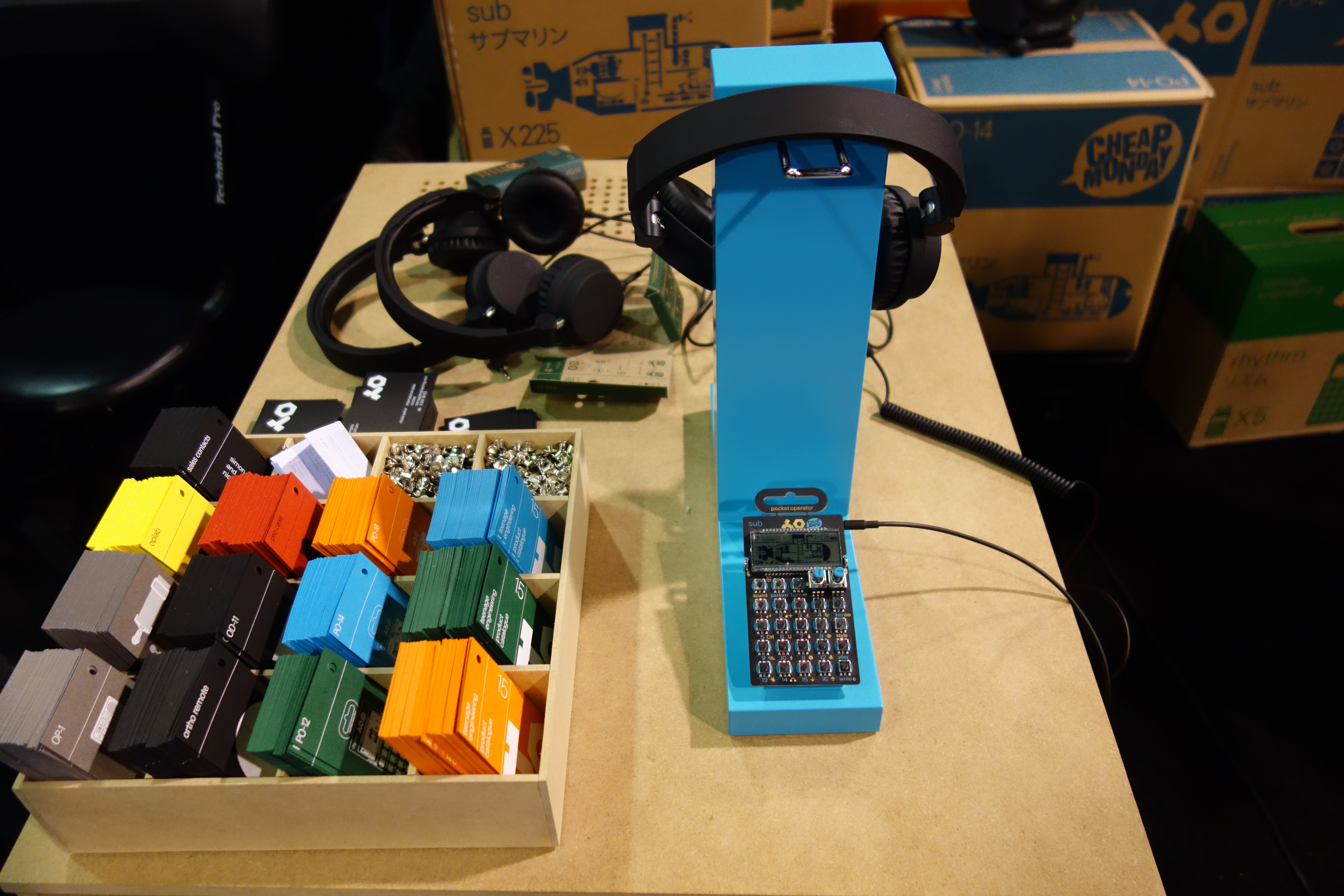
The PO-14 Sub at the 2015 NAMM release

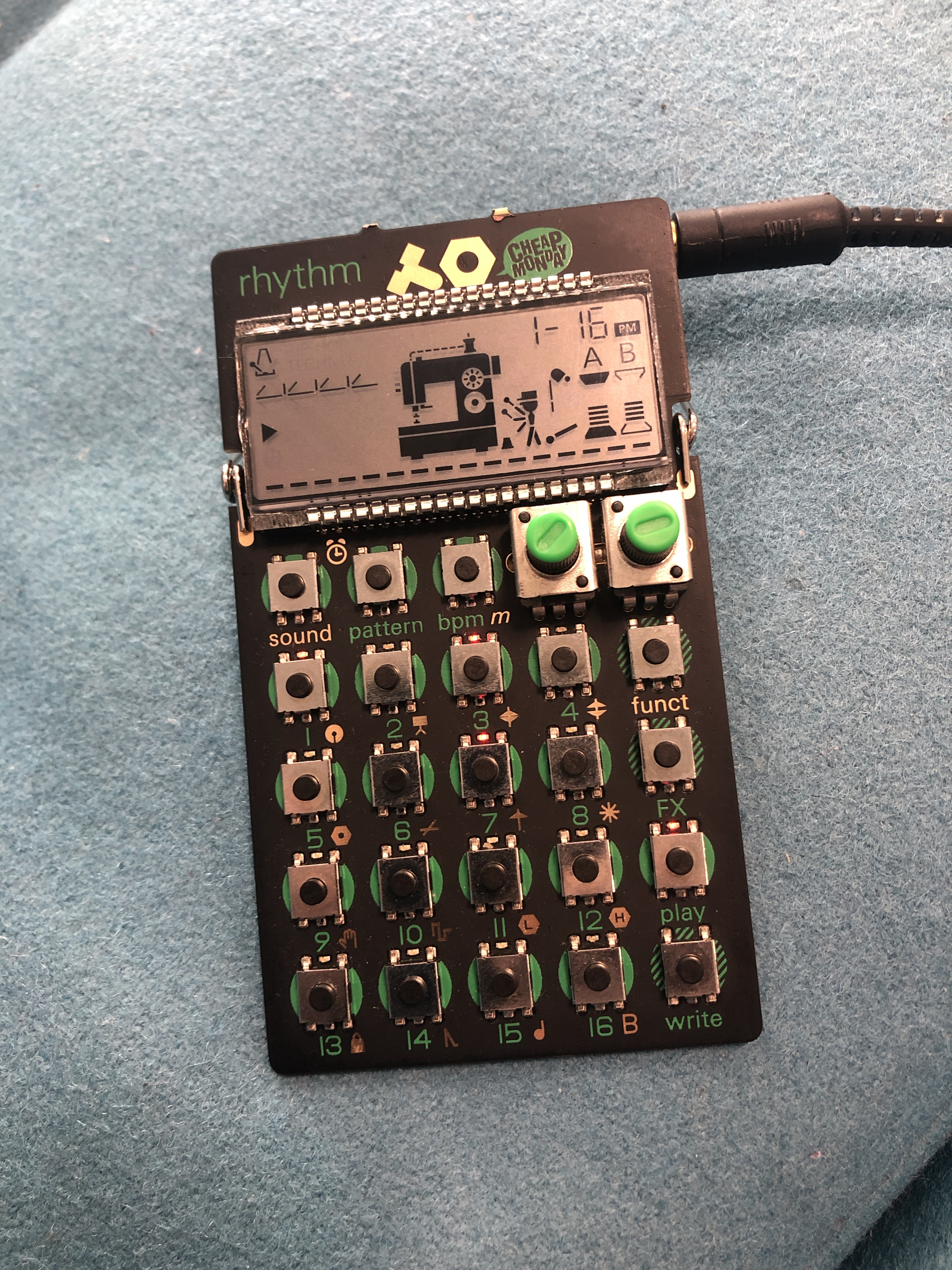
A PO-12 Rhythm drum machine

In collaboration with Cheap Monday, the PO-10 series was unveiled at the 2015 NAMM Show. It consists of three models, an approach Teenage Engineering would repeat for the other two batches.

The original trio consist of:

- PO-12 Rhythm – a basic drum machine with 16 sounds and 16 effects. Two of the sounds are melodic, and can be sequenced in scales. It has a maximum multitimbrality of six parts at a time. Its design is of a sewing machine.
- PO-14 Sub – a bass synthesizer with 15 sounds that also includes a micro drum machine with 16 parts. You can play the sounds over two octaves using the buttons as a keyboard. Its design is of a submarine.
- PO-16 Factory – a melodic lead synthesizer with 15 lead sounds and (like the PO-14) a micro drum machine with 16 sounds. It focuses on robotic sounds. Lead sounds are able to be played diatonically in either C major or A minor, using the buttons as a keyboard. Its design is of a construction site.

The PO-10 series have ebooks written about them by the Swedish music producer Peter Anderson. The ebooks, entitled Masterclass, provide insight into how to use the Pocket Operators. Anderson self published the books in 2015. The Masterclass ebooks are all under 30 pages.

=== PO-20 series ===
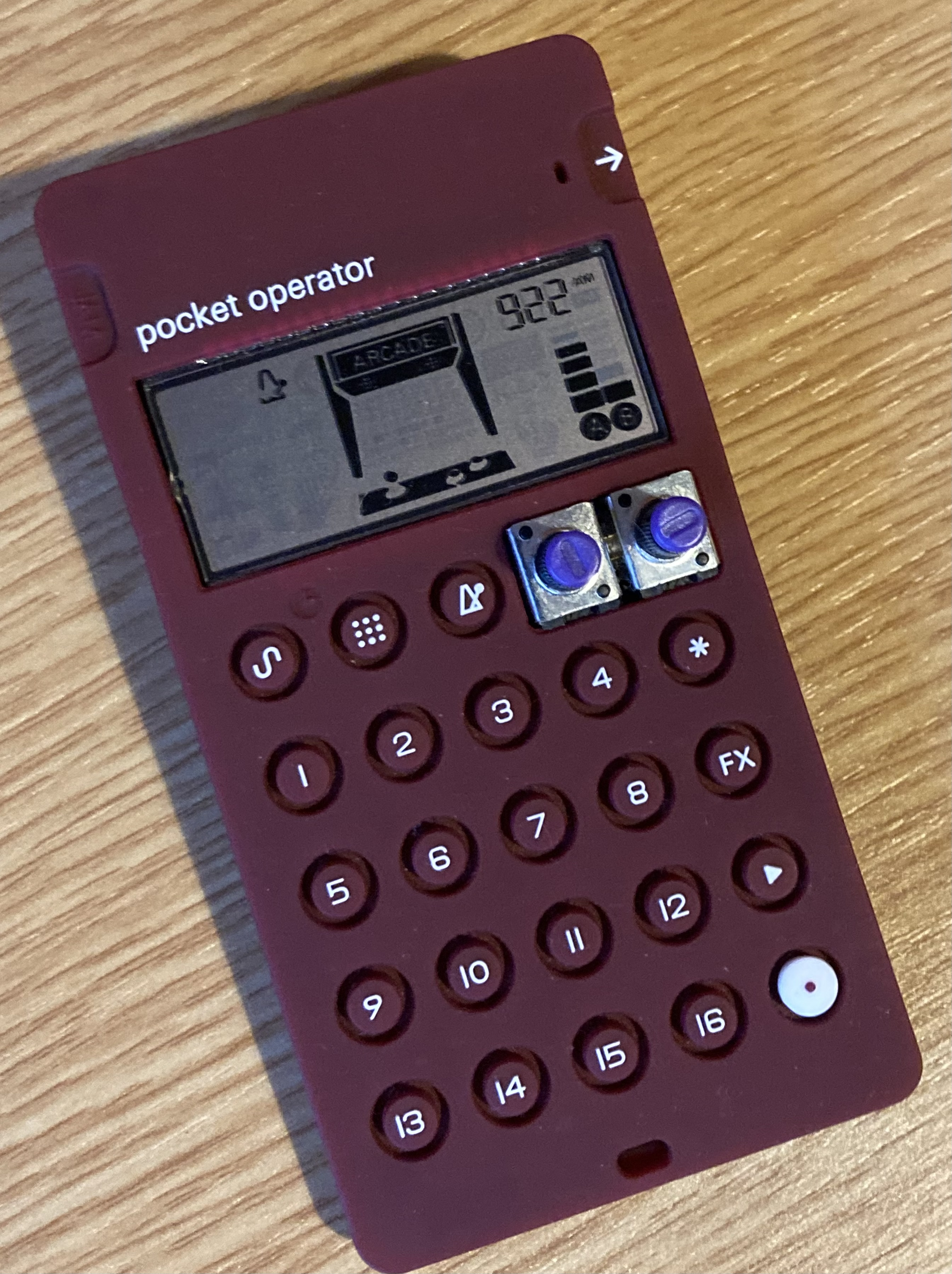
The PO-20 in a silicone case

Following on from the positive reception of the Pocket Operators, Teenage Engineering released the PO-20 series one year later at the 2016 NAMM Show. The PO-20 series is based around 8-bit sounds, taking inspiration from old chiptune synthesizers. The PO-20s were again made in collaboration with Cheap Monday.

There are three models in the PO-20 series:

- PO-20 Arcade – described by MusicRadar as a "Chiptune groovebox", the PO-20 features 16 drum and melodic parts based on sounds from old arcade machines. It has a chord mode, with 16 different chords able to be chained together like patterns. The melodic scale that the sounds play in changes in accordance with the current chord. Based on chord mode, the PO-20 also has a "chord machine" function which plays a drone of whatever chord is active. The drone is able to be sidechained to the kick sound. The PO-20 contains 16 effects. The PO-20's design is of an arcade cabinet.
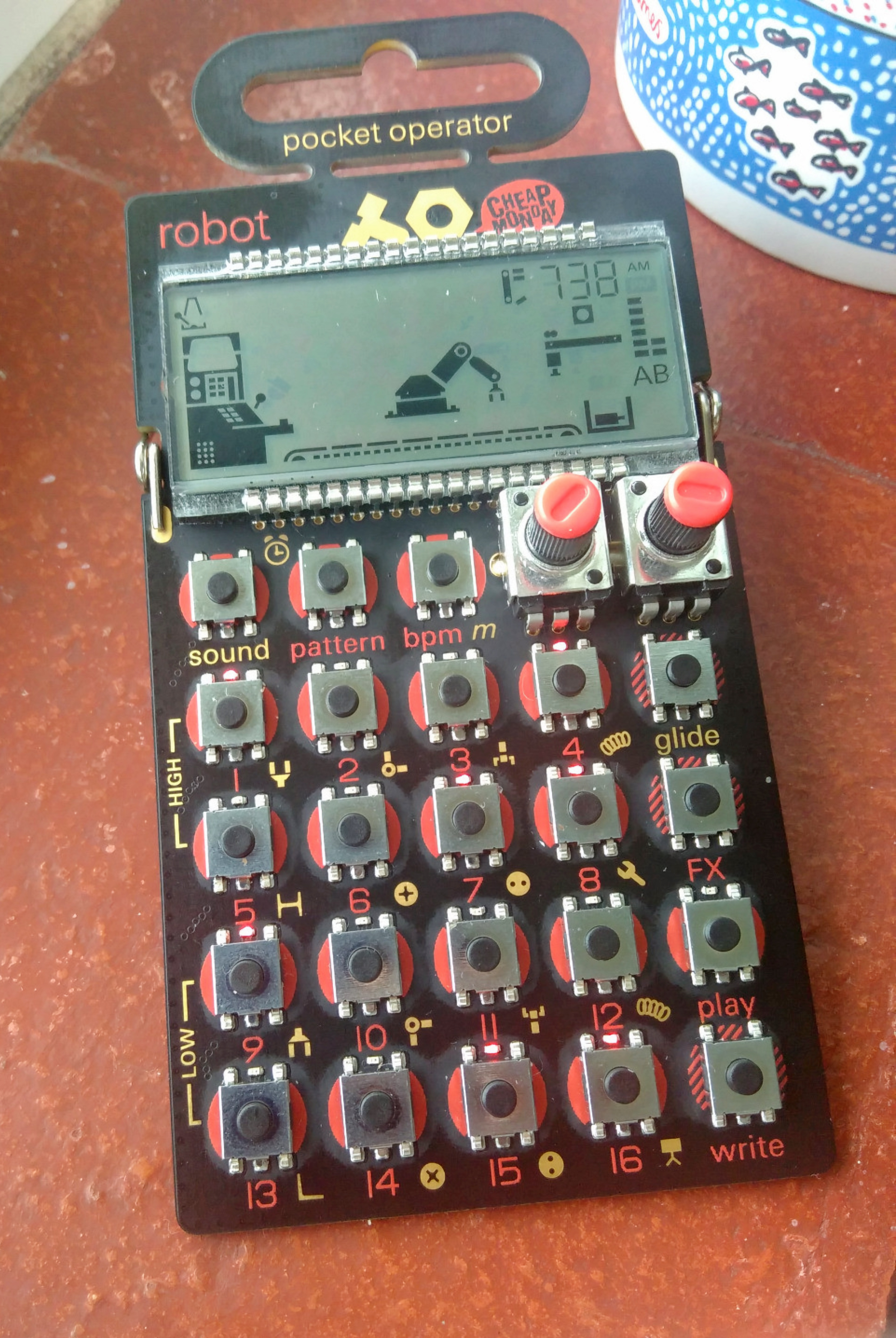
- PO-28 Robot
  PO-24 Office – a groovebox inspired by vintage office equipment. It combines both real samples of office hardware and original synthesizer engines. It has a solo function, which mutes all other parts for the duration of a 16 step pattern. It also includes a "step multiplier" which acts like a stutter effect, repeating the note. The PO-24's design is of a typewriter.
- PO-28 Robot – a lead synthesizer based on 8-bit sounds. It features 15 different lead synthesizer engines and a 16-part micro drum machine. It can be played live by using the buttons as a keyboard but also features a sequencer. The Robot has a glide function that can add portamento between notes or function as vibrato. Its design is of a robot arm.

=== PO-30 series ===
The PO-30 series of Pocket Operators was released at two times. The PO-32 Tonic was released at NAMM 2017; the PO-33 K.O! and PO-35 Speak were released a year later in 2018. The PO-30 series is also known as the Metal Series - their packaging is in the colour of precious metals (Speak is bronze, K.O! is silver, Tonic is gold). Each model in the Metal series has a microphone to provide connections to external devices:

- PO-32 Tonic – a drum machine based on the MicroTonic VST plugin made in collaboration with its developer Magnus Lidström. It has control over each part's pitch and morph (blend between two sounds). Tonic can have sounds and patches replaced by data transferred from MicroTonic using the microphone/line in. Its design is of people drinking at a bar and was made by Ivana Kouthoofd, the nine-year-old daughter of Teenage Engineering's CEO.
- PO-33 K.O! – a sampler. Samples can be recorded through line in or microphone and sorted into one of eight melodic tracks or one of eight drum tracks. Melodic tracks are capable of playing chromatically while drum tracks are played as hits. The K.O! has a maximum timbrality of four samples, but all samples are monophonic. Each track has a multi-mode digital filter (with control over resonance) which can be controlled by the sequencer. The K.O! can back-up and load data as audio. The design is of a boxing match.
- PO-35 Speak – a speech synthesizer. It has 16 tracks, of which 1-15 use the speech synthesis engine and 16 uses a monophonic 16 part version of the PO-32's sound engine. Sounds are used in the PO-35 by recording through the microphone or line-in. The PO-35 has a total of 120 seconds of recording memory: Eight seconds per slot. There are eight voices to choose from for the speech engine: Natural, Autotune, Retro, Noise, Robot, Fifth, Vocoder and Synth. Control over each engine is made using the Pitch, Formant, Start point and Speed parameters. Unlike other Pocket Operators, the Speech only has eight effects. The PO-35 can play in four scales named Major, Minor, Blues and Arab. Its design is of an infant speaking to their parents.

== Limited editions and other products ==
- In April 2019, a limited edition run was created of the PO-33 K.O!. A commission by the record label Ghostly International for their 20th anniversary, it features built-in samples by the artist Steve Hauschildt. Other than that, an increased price to $135 and an updated color scheme, the PO-33 Ghostly Edition is functionally the same as the regular PO-33.
- In May 2019, Teenage Engineering released the PO-137 Rick and Morty, a collaboration with the co-creator of the Adult Swim series Justin Roiland. A design based on the PO-35 speak, the PO-137 is a vocal synthesizer and features a microphone to sample into 8 voice types. It differs by the fact that it has custom voice lines pre-loaded. All are voiced by Roiland.
- In October 2020, a duo of limited edition Pocket Operators were released. In a collaboration with Capcom, the PO-128 Megaman and the PO-133 Street Fighter are based on the PO-28 and PO-33 respectively. Like the other limited edition releases, the PO-128 has Megaman songs loaded as patterns in the sequencer, while the PO-133 has sampled sounds from the original game in its memory. Their designs are also inspired by the original games.
- In June 2022, Teenage Engineering released Pocket Operator for Pixel, a free app in collaboration with Google. It is made for and only available on Google's Pixel phones. The workflow is similar to the hardware Pocket Operators, with the ability to sample audio and video (using TensorFlow technology) into the sequencer to create music.

== See also ==
- Korg Volca – a similar line of affordable electronic musical instruments
- Roland AIRA Compact – a similar line of affordable electronic musical instruments
