= Teenage Engineering =

Swedish electronics company

- Industry: Consumer electronics
- Founded: 2005; 21 years ago
- Founders: Jesper Kouthoofd; David Eriksson; Jens Rudberg; David Möllerstedt
- Headquarters: Stockholm, Sweden
- Area served: Worldwide
- Products: OP-1; Pocket Operators
- Number of employees: 55 (2019)
- Website: teenage.engineering

Teenage Engineering is a Swedish consumer electronics, design company, and manufacturer specializing in synthesizers, drum machines, and grooveboxes. In addition to musical instruments, Teenage Engineering occasionally produces or designs consumer goods such as speakers, instant cameras, and computer cases. Teenage Engineering was founded in 2005 by Jesper Kouthoofd, David Eriksson, Jens Rudberg and David Möllerstedt and is based in Stockholm. Its core products are the OP-1 and OP-1 Field.

== History ==
Teenage Engineering was founded in 2005 by Jesper Kouthoofd, Jens Rudberg and David Eriksson, the three of whom had previously led the computer games company Netbabyworld from 1999–2003. They were later joined by David Möllerstedt, who previously headed the audio department at EA DICE.

Their first product, the OP-1, was introduced at the NAMM Show in 2010. Shortly after release, Teenage Engineering produced several "accessories", which could be used to manipulate the unit's input knobs.

Following the success of the OP-1, the company began working with the Stig Carlsson Foundation to develop the OD-11 speaker, inspired by a speaker of the same name manufactured by Sonab and designed by Swedish designer Stig Carlsson in 1974. It was well received for its minimalist design, a faithful reproduction of the original, and for its sound quality. Despite two early appearances at the Consumer Electronics Show and an original release date of Summer 2013, it was not released until 2014. Teenage Engineering aimed to maintain Carlsson's goal of designing a speaker for use in a "regular home", rather than one designed to be used in an unrealistically ideal, noiseless environment.

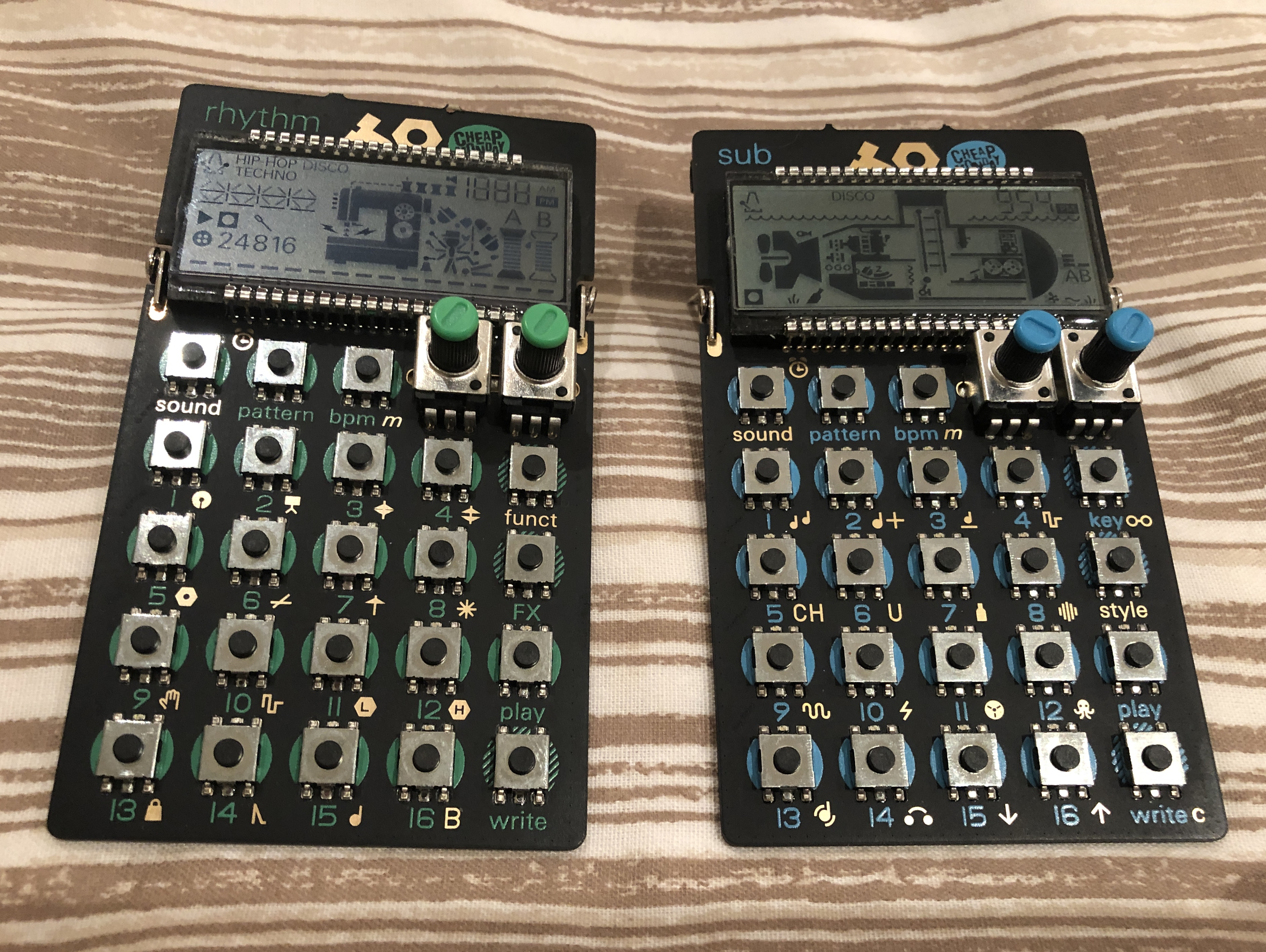
Two Pocket Operators

In 2013, the company collaborated with the Swedish clothing company Cheap Monday after ordering new work uniforms from them; Kouthoofd had previously collaborated with creative director, Ann-Sofie Back. The companies jointly announced the Pocket Operator (PO-10) synthesizer series in January 2015. The series includes three models: PO-12 rhythm, a drum machine; PO-14 sub, a bass synthesizer; and PO-16 factory, a lead synthesizer. Each model doubles as a 16-step sequencer. According to CEO Jesper Kouthoofd, Teenage Engineering sought to design synthesizers that would retail for US$49; however, each PO actually retails from US$59 to US$99. The POs target musicians seeking a less expensive alternative to the OP-1, which currently retails for US$1,399. The series uses a minimalist design, evoking pocket calculators and, according to Kouthoofd, Nintendo's Game & Watch games. Sonically, they emulate vintage synthesizers, in response to the contemporary surge in the popularity of retro style electronic music gear. The synthesizers debuted at the 2015 NAMM Show. The Pocket Operators were a success at NAMM, and sales were estimated by third parties to be as high as 40,000 units, which delayed shipments by up to three months.

The PO-20 series of the Pocket Operators were introduced at the 2016 NAMM show. The PO-20 synthesizers have some additional effects and functionality that were not present in the original PO-10 series, but maintain the US$59 price point. The PO-30 series further elaborates upon the original Pocket operators by adding a drum synthesizer made in collaboration with MicroTonic, a sampler, and a voice synthesizer. These were released starting in late 2017 at a slightly increased price from previous series. PO-30 devices feature a microphone for use in recording audio samples and for transferring data.

In 2018, Teenage Engineering announced a new line of audio equipment products, Frekvens, in collaboration with IKEA. The modular system takes visual cues from Bauhaus design. Founder Kouthoofd had previously collaborated with IKEA on Knäppa, a camera made of cardboard.

On 22 May 2019, Panic announced Playdate, a new handheld video game console designed in collaboration with Teenage Engineering. The device features a mechanical crank which is specifically credited to Teenage Engineering.

On 25 February 2021, Teenage Engineering announced that it will partner with the British electronics company, Nothing, to produce the design aesthetic of the brand and their products. Teenage Engineering later worked on the audio for the "ear (1)", Nothing's first product.

On 9 January 2024, Rabbit Inc. announced the release of the Rabbit r1, co-designed with Teenage Engineering, a pocket assistant device that leverages a machine learning model to automate various tasks.

== Awards and accolades ==
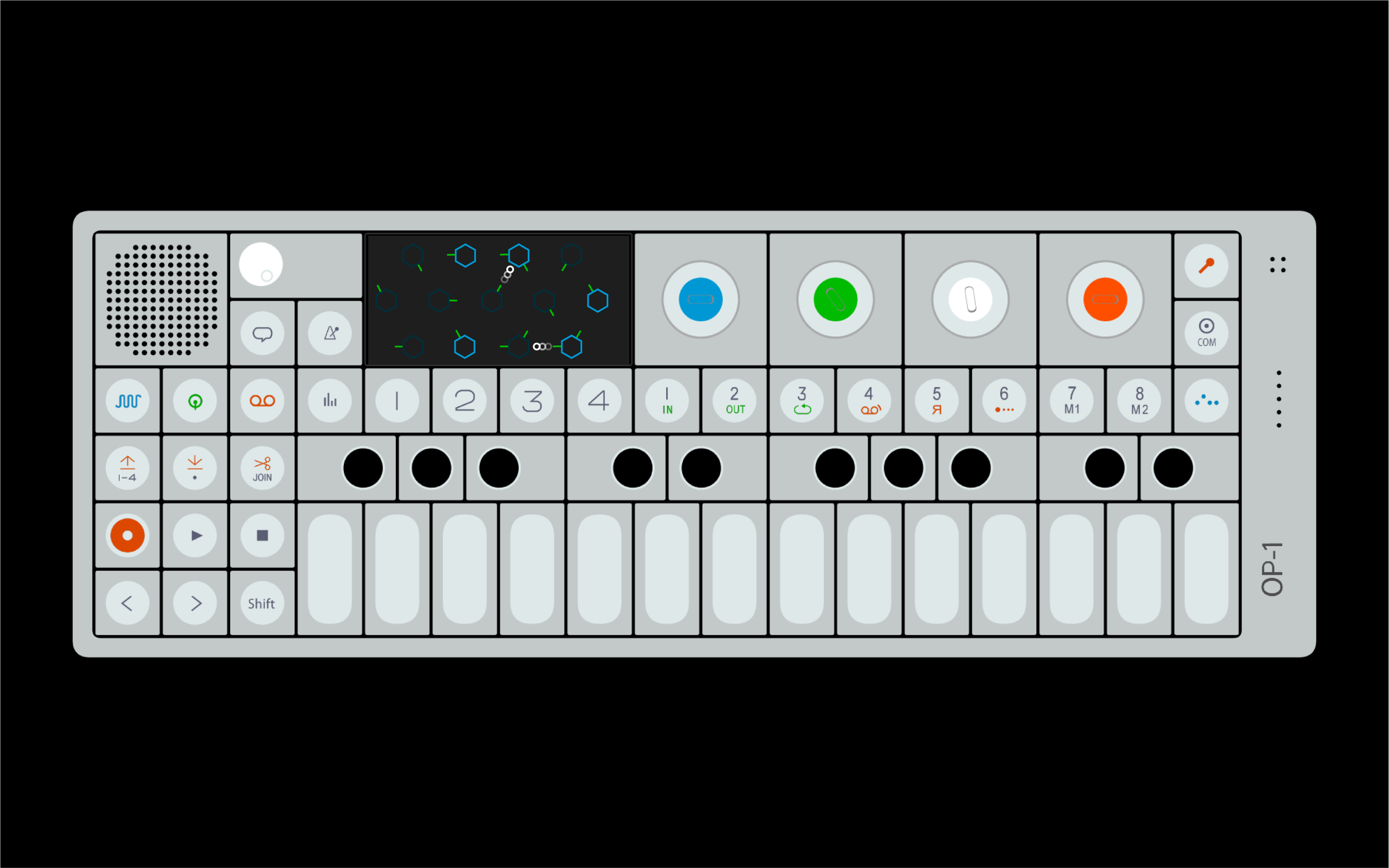
The OP-1 has won awards for its design and sound engines.

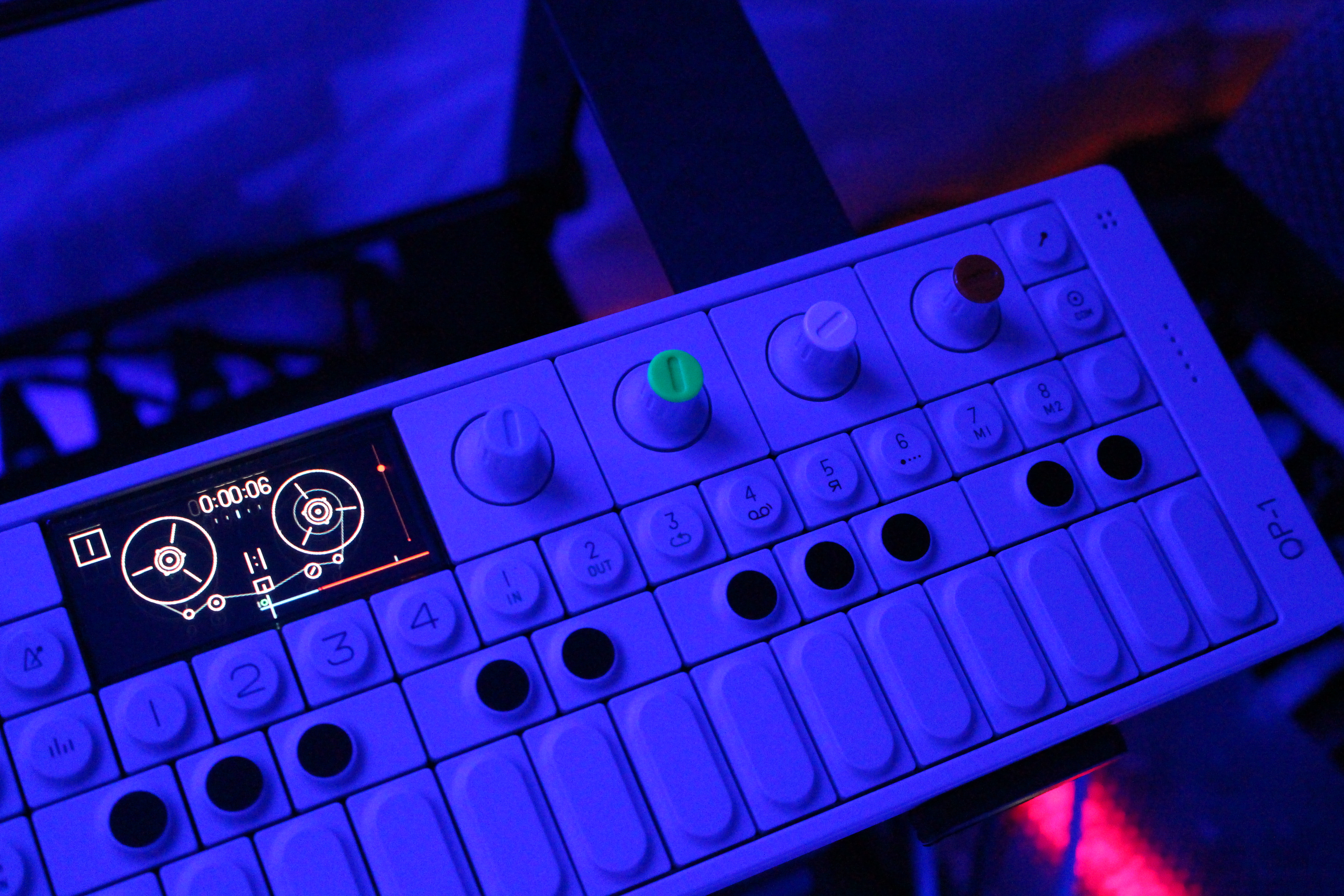
OP-1 detail

The OP-1 synthesizer won one of ten of Sweden's Design S Awards in 2012. The award committee described the OP-1 as "A technological product which through a clever colour scheme and fantastic graphics is intuitive, easily accessible and incredibly inviting. Music and machine in one".

In 2014, the OP-1 was awarded second prize in Georgia Tech's Margaret Guthman Musical Instrument Competition.

In 2017, the Pocket Operator series was awarded a Good Design Award by the Japan Institute of Design Promotion. The Institute noted that while the functions of the devices were not immediately clear, the format "inspires a desire to press the buttons".

Musicians who have used the OP-1 include Bon Iver, Beck, Depeche Mode, Jean Michel Jarre, Caroline Rose, and Ivan Dorn.

== Products ==
- OP-1 synthesizer/sampler/sequencer (introduced January 2010)
- PX-0 earbuds (introduced 2011, collaboration with AIAIAI, discontinued)
- Oplab MIDI and CV/gate interface (introduced January 2012)
- OD-11 wireless loudspeaker (introduced January 2013)
- ortho remote remote controller (introduced January 2013)
- PO-12 Rhythm drum machine/sequencer, PO-14 Sub synthesizer/sequencer & PO-16 Factory synthesizer/sequencer (introduced January 2015; collaboration with Cheap Monday)
- Impossible I-1 instant camera (introduced May 2016; designed by Teenage Engineering for The Impossible Project)
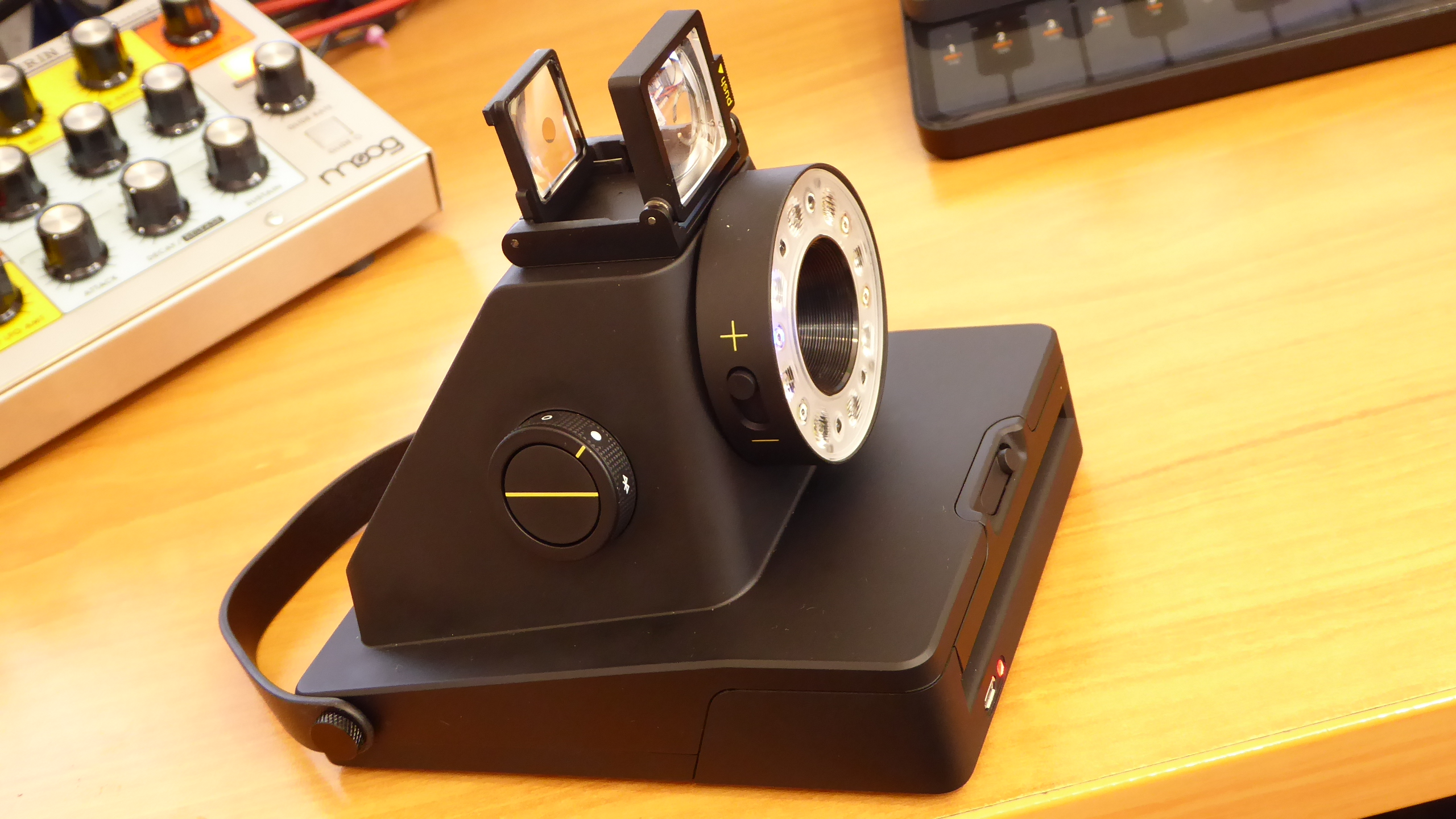
  Impossible I-1 analog instant camera
- PO-20 Arcade synthesizer/sequencer, PO-24 Office drum machine/sequencer & PO-28 Robot synthesizer/sequencer (introduced January 2016; collaboration with Cheap Monday)
- PO-32 Tonic drum synthesizer and sequencer (introduced January 2017)
- H smart speaker and R smart display (introduced November 2017; designed by Teenage Engineering for Baidu Raven)
- PO-33 KO! sampler/sequencer and PO-35 speak voice synthesizer/sequencer (introduced January 2018)
- Frekvens audio and lighting collection (introduced April 2018; designed by Teenage Engineering for IKEA)
- OP-Z synthesizer and sequencer (introduced September 2018)
- pocket operator modular series (POM-16 keyboard/sequencer, POM-170 analog synthesizer/sequencer & POM-400 analog synthesizer) (introduced January 2019)
- PO-137 Rick and Morty synthesizer/sequencer (introduced July 2019; collaboration with Adult Swim based on Rick and Morty)
- Playdate game console (introduced May 2019; designed by teenage engineering for Panic Inc.)
- M-1 headphones (introduced December 2019)
- OB-4 radio (introduced September 2020)
- PO-128 Mega Man & PO-133 Streetfighter (introduced October 2020; collaboration with Capcom)
- ear (1) earbuds (introduced July 2021; audio designed by Teenage Engineering for Nothing)
- Mayku Multiplier vacuum forming machine (introduced September 2021; designed by Teenage Engineering for Mayku)
- computer-1 computer case (introduced October 2021)
- TX-6 field mixer (introduced April 2022)
- OP-1 Field synthesizer (introduced May 2022)
- PO-80 portable record player and engraver (introduced October 2022; collaboration with Yuri Suzuki)
- CH-8 singing wooden dolls (introduced November 2022)
- CM-15 microphone (introduced April 2023)
- TP-7 field recorder (introduced May 2023)
- EP-133 K.O. II sampler (introduced November 2023)
- Rabbit r1 (introduced January 2024; designed by Teenage Engineering for rabbit inc.)
- EP-1320 Medieval sampler (introduced August 2024)
- OP-XY sequencer/synthesizer (introduced November 2024)
- B-1 generative film deck (designed for live screenings of Eno (2024 film).)
- EP-40 Riddim sampler (introduced November 2025)
- EP-2350 Ting microphone (introduced November 2025)
