= Sony ILCE-QX1 =

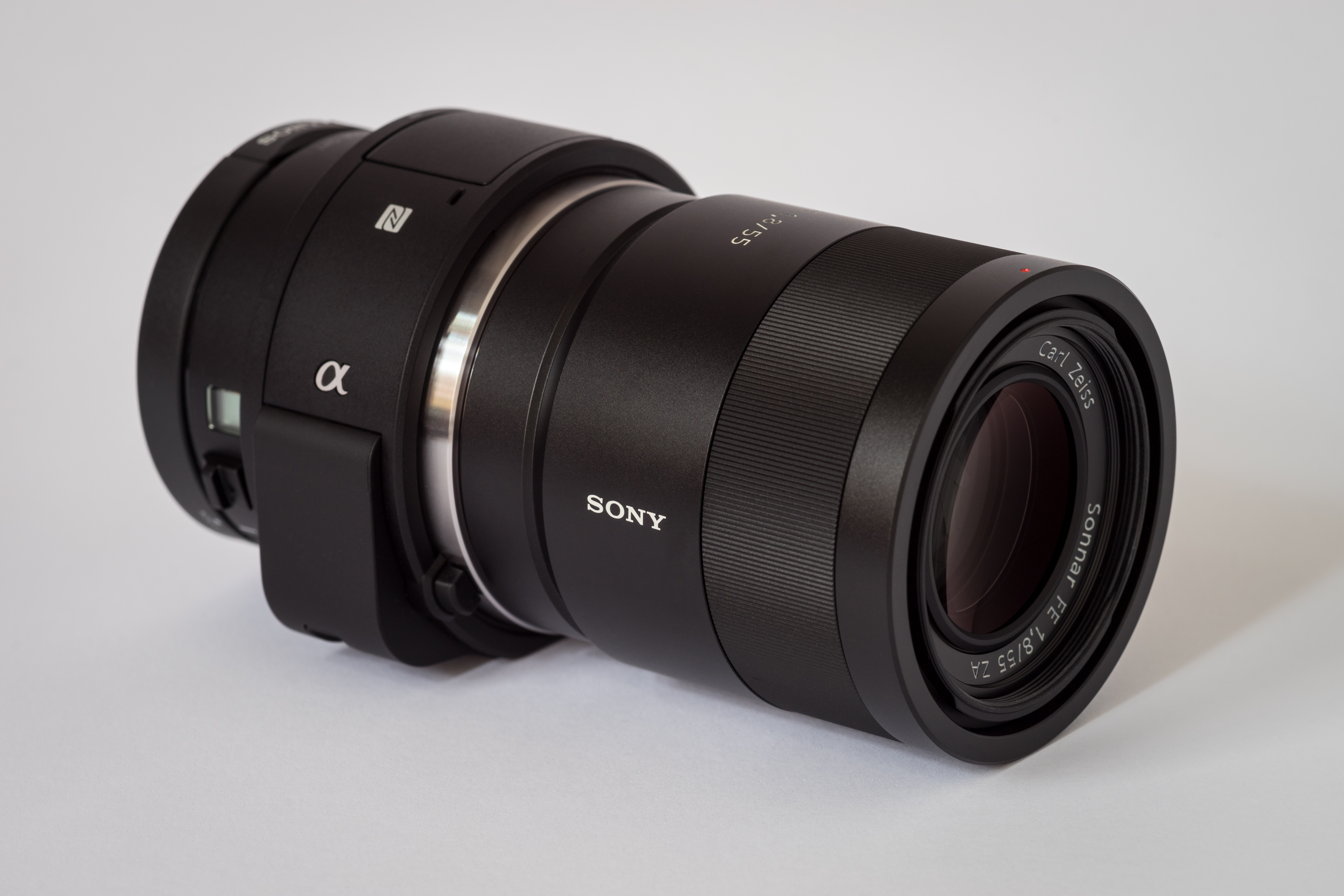
- Sony Alpha ILCE-QX1

Overview
- Maker: Sony

Lens
- Lens mount: Sony E-mount

Sensor/medium
- Sensor type: CMOS
- Sensor size: 23.2 × 15.4 mm (APS-C type)
- Maximum resolution: 5456 × 3632 (20 megapixels)
- Film speed: 100-16000
- Recording medium: One microSD, microSDHC, microSDXC, or MemoryStick Micro card

Focusing
- Focus areas: 25 focus points

Shutter
- Shutter speeds: 1/4000 s to 30 s
- Continuous shooting: 3.5 frames per second in speed priority mode, 2.5 fps in standard continuous mode

Image processing
- Image processor: Bionz X
- White balance: No

General
- Dimensions: 74 × 70 × 53 mm (2.91 × 2.76 × 2.09 inches)
- Weight: 216 g (8 oz) including battery

The Sony ILCE-QX1 is a mobile device mountable, Wi-Fi-controlled, lens-style compact camera manufactured by Sony and was announced on 3 September 2014. Part of the Sony α family, it is one of Sony's "Smart Lens" cameras, alongside the QX10, QX30 and QX100, that are designed to be specifically used with a smartphone. It has a 20.1 megapixel APS-C-size sensor, uses an interchangeable E-mount lens as its highlight feature, supports power zoom but no in-body image stabilization, and has a pop-up flash unlike its other QX siblings.

== Features ==
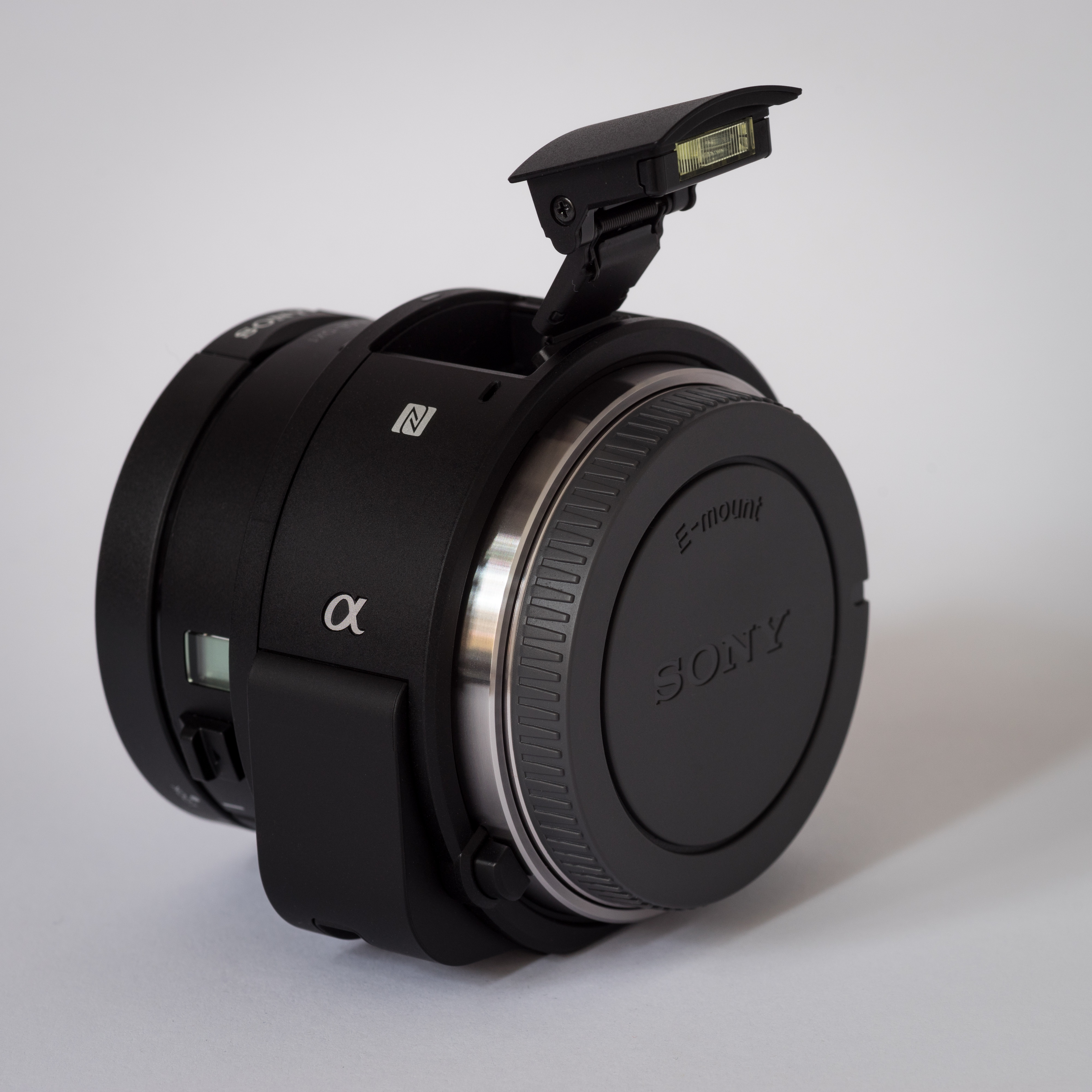
Sony ILCE-QX1 with flash extended.

On the ILCE-QX1 itself, there are buttons for on/off, flash pop-up, lens release and shutter, which are enough for standalone shooting. But due to its lens-style design, the camera module requires an iOS or Android device, connected through the camera's Wi-Fi via the Imaging Edge (formerly PlayMemories) Mobile application, to utilize the device's screen as its viewfinder and camera controls, while also serving as additional storage medium via its integrated wireless file transfer feature.

The ILCE-QX1 allows capture in RAW format, but RAW files can only be directly wirelessly transferred to Android devices and not to iOS devices as of September 2014. Video capture is possible in Full HD at 30 fps, and battery life for still capture is rated at 440 shots.

== See also ==
- Olympus Air
- Sony ILCE camera
- Sony QX series
- List of Sony E-mount cameras
- List of lightest mirrorless cameras

Family	Level	Format	'10	2011		2012	2013	2014	2015	2016	2017	2018	2019	2020	2021	2022	2023	2024	2025	2026
Alpha (α)	Indust	FF																ILX-LR1 ^{●}		
Alpha (α)	Cine line	FF													_{m} FX6 ^{●}					
Alpha (α)	Cine line	FF													_{m} FX3 ^{AT●}					
Alpha (α)	Cine line	FF																		_{m} FX2 ^{AT●}
Alpha (α)	Flag	FF													_{m} α1 ^{FT●}				_{m} α1 II ^{FAT●}	
Alpha (α)	Speed	FF										_{m} α9 ^{FT●}			_{m} α9 II ^{FT●}				_{m} α9 III ^{FAT●}	
Alpha (α)	Sens	FF							_{m} α7S ^{●}	_{m} α7S II ^{F●}					_{m} α7S III ^{AT●}					
Alpha (α)	Hi-Res	FF						_{m} α7R ^{●}		_{m} α7R II ^{F●}		_{m} α7R III ^{FT●}		_{m} α7R IV ^{FT●}			_{m} α7R V ^{FAT●}			
Alpha (α)	Basic	FF						_{m} α7 ^{F●}	_{m} α7 II ^{F●}				_{m} α7 III ^{FT●}			_{m} α7 IV ^{AT●}				
Alpha (α)	Compact	FF																_{m} α7CR ^{AT●}		
Alpha (α)	Compact	FF													_{m} α7C ^{AT●}			_{m} α7C II ^{AT●}		
Alpha (α)	Vlog	FF																_{m} ZV-E1 ^{AT●}		
Alpha (α)	Cine	APS-C															_{m} FX30 ^{AT●}			
Alpha (α)	Adv	APS-C			_{s} NEX-7 ^{F●}						_{m} α6500 ^{FT●}			_{m} α6600 ^{FT●}				_{m} α6700 ^{AT●}		
Alpha (α)	Mid-range	APS-C				_{m} NEX-6 ^{F●}					_{m} α6300 ^{F●}		_{m} α6400 ^{F+T●}							
Alpha (α)	Mid-range	APS-C						_{m} α6000 ^{F●}						_{m} α6100 ^{FT●}						
Alpha (α)	Vlog	APS-C														_{m} ZV-E10 ^{AT●}			_{m} ZV-E10 II ^{AT●}	
Alpha (α)	Entry-level	APS-C	NEX-5 ^{F●}	NEX-5N ^{FT●}		NEX-5R ^{F+T●}	NEX-5T ^{F+T●}		α5100 ^{F+T●}											
Alpha (α)	Entry-level	APS-C	NEX-3 ^{F●}	NEX-C3 ^{F●}		NEX-F3 ^{F+●}	NEX-3N ^{F+●}	α5000 ^{F+●}												
DSLR-style		APS-C					_{m} α3000 ^{●}		_{m} α3500 ^{●}											
SmartShot		APS-C							QX1 ^{M●}											
CineAlta	Cine line	FF										VENICE				VENICE 2				
CineAlta	Cine line	FF																BURANO		
XDCAM	Cine line	FF												_{m} FX9						
XDCAM	Docu	S35							_{m} FS7		_{m} FS7 II									
XDCAM	Mobile	S35								_{m} FS5			_{m} FS5 II							
NXCAM	Pro	S35		NEX-FS100		NEX-FS700	NEX-FS700R													
NXCAM	APS-C					NEX-EA50														
Handycam	FF					_{m} NEX-VG900														
Handycam	APS-C		_{s} NEX-VG10		_{s} NEX-VG20	_{m} NEX-VG30														
Security		FF									SNC-VB770									
Security		FF									UMC-S3C									
Family	Level	Format																		
Family	Level	Format	'10	2011		2012	2013	2014	2015	2016	2017	2018	2019	2020	2021	2022	2023	2024	2025	2026
