= Yuri Suzuki (designer) =

Japanese designer

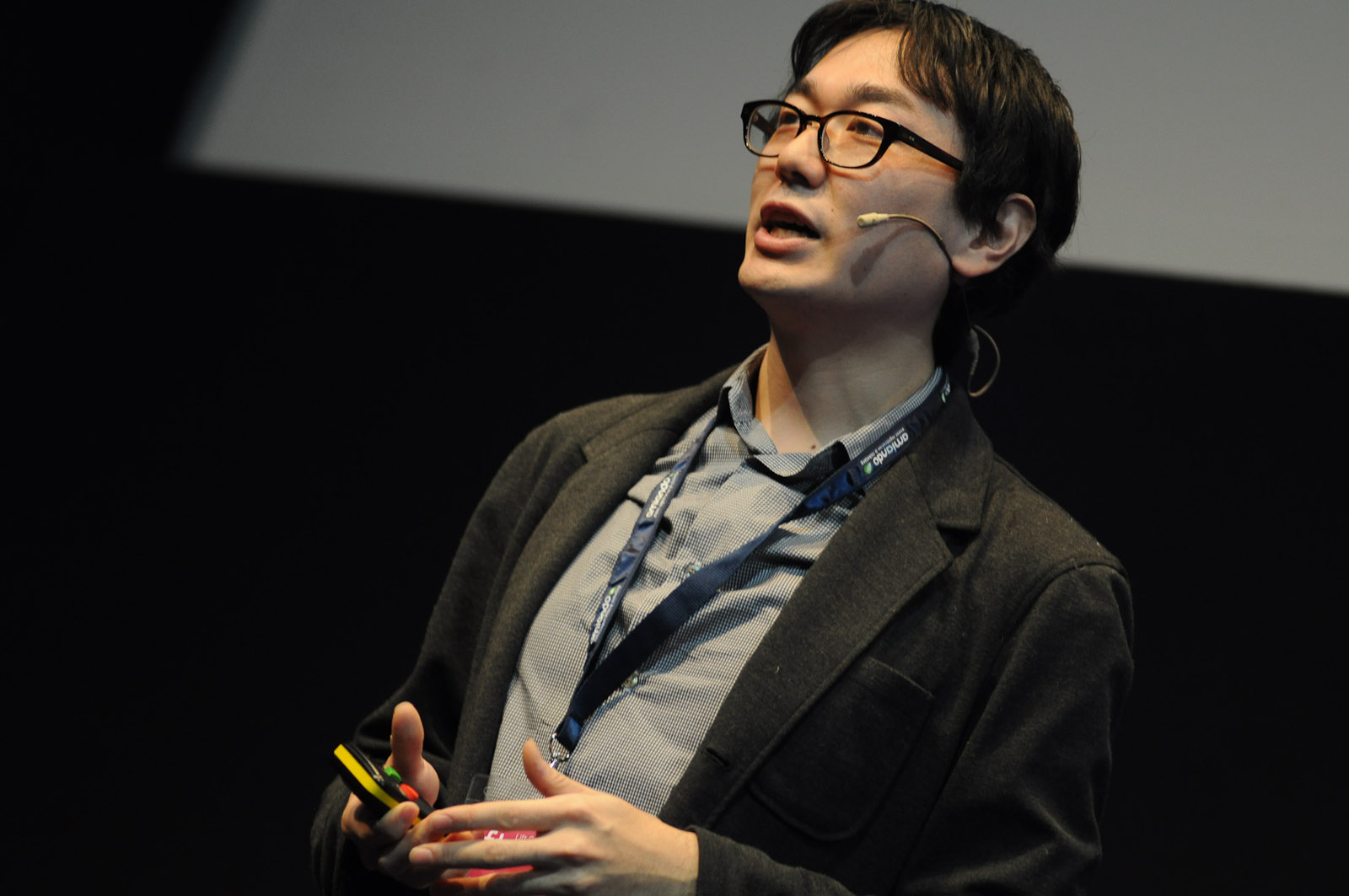
- Suzuki in 2011
- Born: 1980 (age 45–46); Tokyo, Japan
- Education: Royal College of Art
- Occupations: Artist, Designer, Musician
- Employer: Pentagram
- Website: yurisuzuki.com

Yuri Suzuki (スズキ ユウリ, Suzuki Yūri) (born 1980) is a Japanese artist, designer and musician. Primarily known for his work in sound design, Suzuki was a partner of the London office of Pentagram between November 2018 and May 2024. In April 2025, Suzuki was appointed Visiting Professor at Nihon University.

== Early life and education ==
Yuri Suzuki was born in 1980 in Tokyo, Japan and grew up in Shibuya ward. While at Wako Gakuen High School, he became a fan of the product design artist collective Maywa Denki and started making replicas of their music instruments. Maywa Denki soon noticed Suzuki's activity and in 1999 made him an assistant. He continued working and performing as a part of the collective throughout his BA Product Design studies at Nihon University. In 2005, Suzuki moved to London and to study in the MA Design Products program at the Royal College of Art.

== Career ==
After completing his graduate education, Suzuki started to work on his sound installations and experimental product designs as well as participating in artist-in-residence programmes in Japan, UK and India.

Alongside his activities as an artist and designer, Suzuki also worked for Teenage Engineering in Stockholm and Research Department of Disney in California, and fully relocated back to London in 2012. In 2013, Suzuki launched Ototo, a circuit board that turns any conductive materials into a music instrument.

Suzuki designed and produced musical instruments for will.i.am and Jeff Mills, and organized a workshop-based music video brief with Damian Kulash from OK Go.

Suzuki taught at the Royal College of Art and School of Architecture Interactive Architecture Lab, University College London as a visiting tutor, gave lectures and held workshops at numerous art colleges in Europe. In November 2018, Suzuki joined the London office of Pentagram as a partner.

September 2020 saw Suzuki launch the experimental music label MSG with the inaugural release Scott’s Dream – Music From A Reimagined Digital Electronium paying tribute to the work of Raymond Scott.

In 2024, Suzuki collaborated with Japanese musician Cornelius (Keigo Oyamada) on The Ambient Machine – Cornelius edition, a special edition of Suzuki's sound device The Ambient Machine produced with E&Y. The edition included a bespoke ambient sound work by Oyamada and a redesigned visual identity for the object.

Suzuki worked on the art direction and packaging for OK Go's 2025 album And the Adjacent Possible, with Damian Kulash, Claudio Ripol, Wombi Rose and Hà Trịnh Quốc Bảo credited as co-art directors. The album was nominated for Best Recording Package at the 68th Annual Grammy Awards.

== Exhibitions ==
- 2014: solo exhibition at Pola Museum Annex, Tokyo.
- 2019: retrospective exhibition titled Sound in Mind: Yuri Suzuki at London's Design Museum
- 2025: UTOOTO interactive installation held at London's Camden Arts Projects

== Collections ==
- Museum of Modern Art, New York
- Art Institute of Chicago

== Recognition and awards ==
- Designer of the Future Award Design Miami /Swarovski (2016)
- Honorary mention (Sound Art) Prix Ars Electronica (2016)
- Honorary mention (Interactive Art) Prix Ars Electronica (2016)
- Designers in Residence Design Museum, London (2012)
- Honorary mention (Interactive Art) Prix Ars Electronica (2009)
