= Cheap Monday =

Swedish clothing label

- Original Cheap Monday logo, designed by Vår
- Type: Private
- Industry: Fashion
- Founded: 2004
- Founders: Örjan Andersson and Adam Friberg
- Headquarters: Stockholm, Sweden
- Products: Jeans, sneakers, shirts, flannel
- Parent: H&M

Cheap Monday is a Swedish clothing label known for its skinny jeans and association with 2000s youth culture. Founded in 2004 by Örjan Andersson and Adam Friberg, it was originally established as Weekday, a second-hand store in a Stockholm suburb. The brand then began selling its own designs, its name derived from the fact that the original store was only open on Sundays.

Cheap Monday eventually expanded beyond jeans to include sneakers, flannel, and shirts. Its collections were distributed worldwide in a variety of stores such as Urban Outfitters and Barneys New York, as well as online retailers like The Iconic, SurfStitch, and ASOS. In addition to franchise locations, the label had four standalone stores in London, Paris, Beijing, and Shenyang, and launched several pop-up shops in Stockholm, Utrecht, Los Angeles, and Hong Kong.

== Collaborations ==
Teenage Engineering approached now former Cheap Monday designer Ann-Sofie Back to create an affordable synthesizer. This partnership led to the Pocket Operator series, which debuted at the 2015 NAMM Trade Show and has since sold around 1 million units.

== Acquisition ==
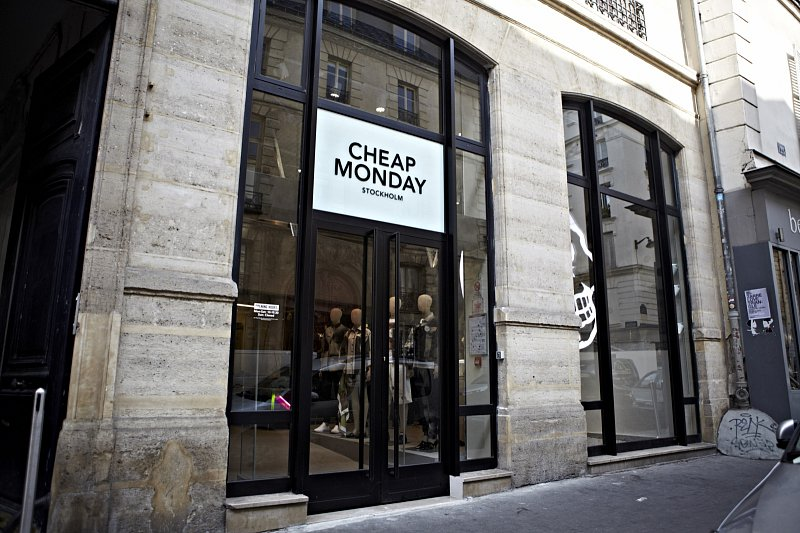
Cheap Monday branch in Paris

On March 6, 2008 it was announced that retailer H & M Hennes & Mauritz AB (H&M) would acquire the company Fabric Scandinavien AB, maker of Cheap Monday jeans and operator of the Weekday store. H&M bought 60 percent of Fabric Scandinavien for 564 million Swedish kronor (US$92 million at the time) from the founders of the company: Adam Friberg, Lars Karlsson, Örjan Andersson and Linda Friberg. H&M had "the possibility/obligation to acquire the remaining shares in the company within three to five years."

== Closure and Relaunch ==
As of November 2018, H&M announced that they would be closing their Cheap Monday brand due to poor sales. The closure of the business was completed in June 2019. In April 2024, H&M Group announced the brand would be relaunched and sold through their Weekday retail stores.
