= Teenage Engineering OP-1 =

Portable synthesizer and sequencer

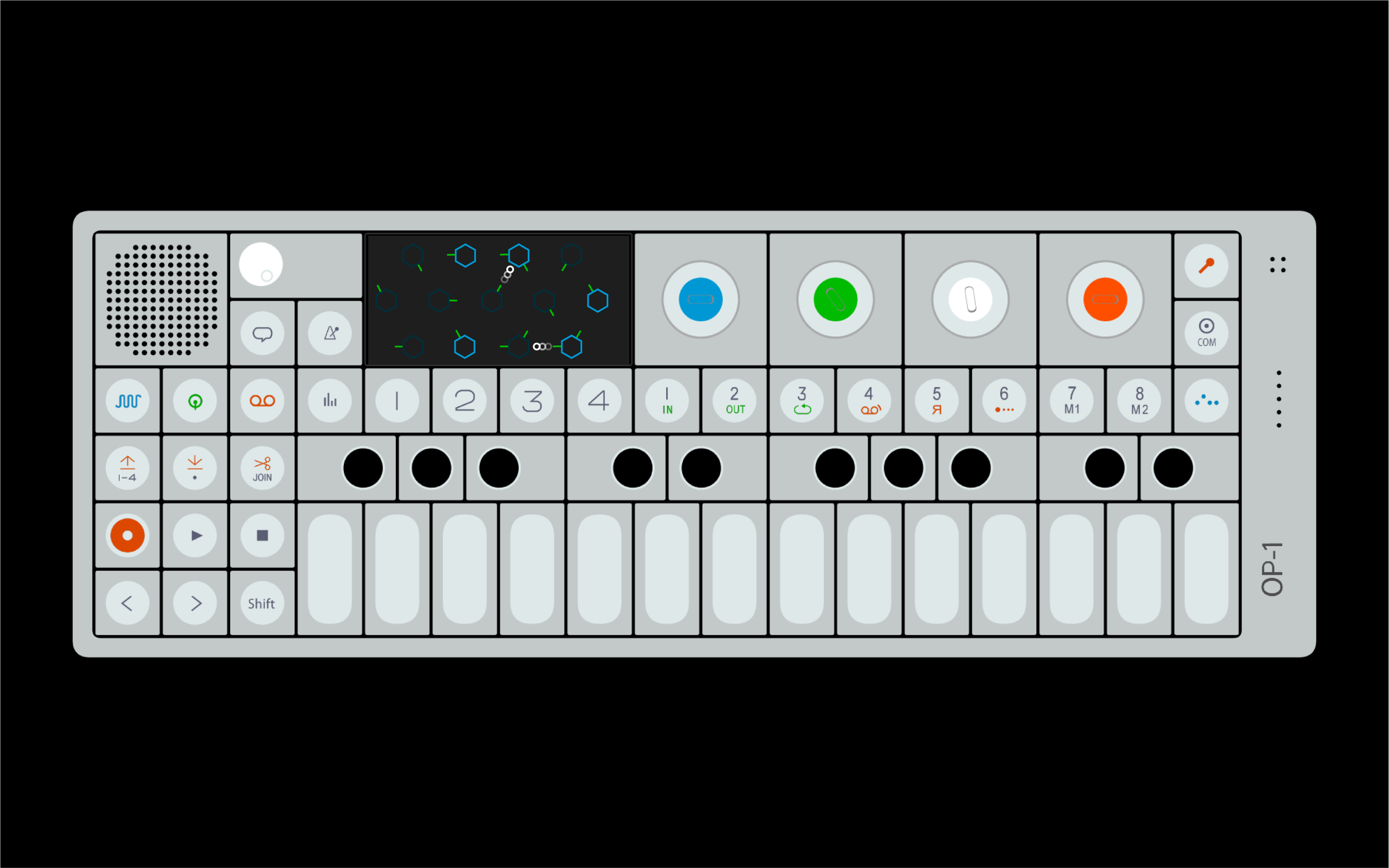
- Manufacturer: Teenage Engineering
- Dates: 2011–Present
- Price: €1,999; US$2,340; kr 21,973

Technical specifications
- Polyphony: 6
- Timbrality: Monotimbral
- Oscillator: 1 DCO per voice (pulse, saw, square)
- LFO: Multiple
- Synthesis type: 10 engines with exchangeable architecture
- Attenuator: ADSR envelope generator
- Aftertouch expression: No
- Velocity expression: No
- Storage memory: 512 MB Nand Flash storage
- Effects: Delay, Phone (bit crusher), Punch (low-pass filter), Grid (feedback plate reverb), Spring (spring reverb), Nitro (band-pass filter), CWO (frequency-shifting delay)

Input/output
- Keyboard: 24 keys
- External control: USB MIDI in and out

The Teenage Engineering OP-1 is a synthesizer, sampler and sequencer designed and manufactured by the Stockholm-based company Teenage Engineering. The OP-1 was Teenage Engineering's first product; it was released in 2011 following an introduction at the NAMM Show. It is also considered their core product.

The OP-1 is well known for its unconventional design, AMOLED display, and the depth of its synthesis engines.

== Development ==
Teenage Engineering was founded in 2005 by Jesper Kouthoofd, David Eriksson, Jens Rudberg and David Mollerstedt. The OP-1 is the first product developed by the company. At the time, the team consisted of nine engineers and software developers. Following an announcement at Frankfurt Musikmesse in 2009, they presented a prototype of the OP-1 at the 2010 NAMM Show in Anaheim, and it was released in the following year.

The design of the OP-1 was influenced by the VL-Tone, a synthesizer and pocket calculator manufactured by Casio in 1979. The VL-1 is known for its toy-like novelty sounds and cheap build quality, as well as its inorganic design. In an interview with Damian Kulash of OK Go, CEO Kouthoofd explained that he worked in a music store when he was young, and he was inspired by Japanese synthesizers of the 1980s, such as the VL-Tone and the Casio SK-1, an inexpensive sampler. Kouthoofd has also stated that "limitations are OP-1's biggest feature". The synthesizer's designers attempted to use the limitation of physical hardware to encourage the unit to stimulate creativity, which might become unfocused in a limitless environment, such as a digital audio workstation.

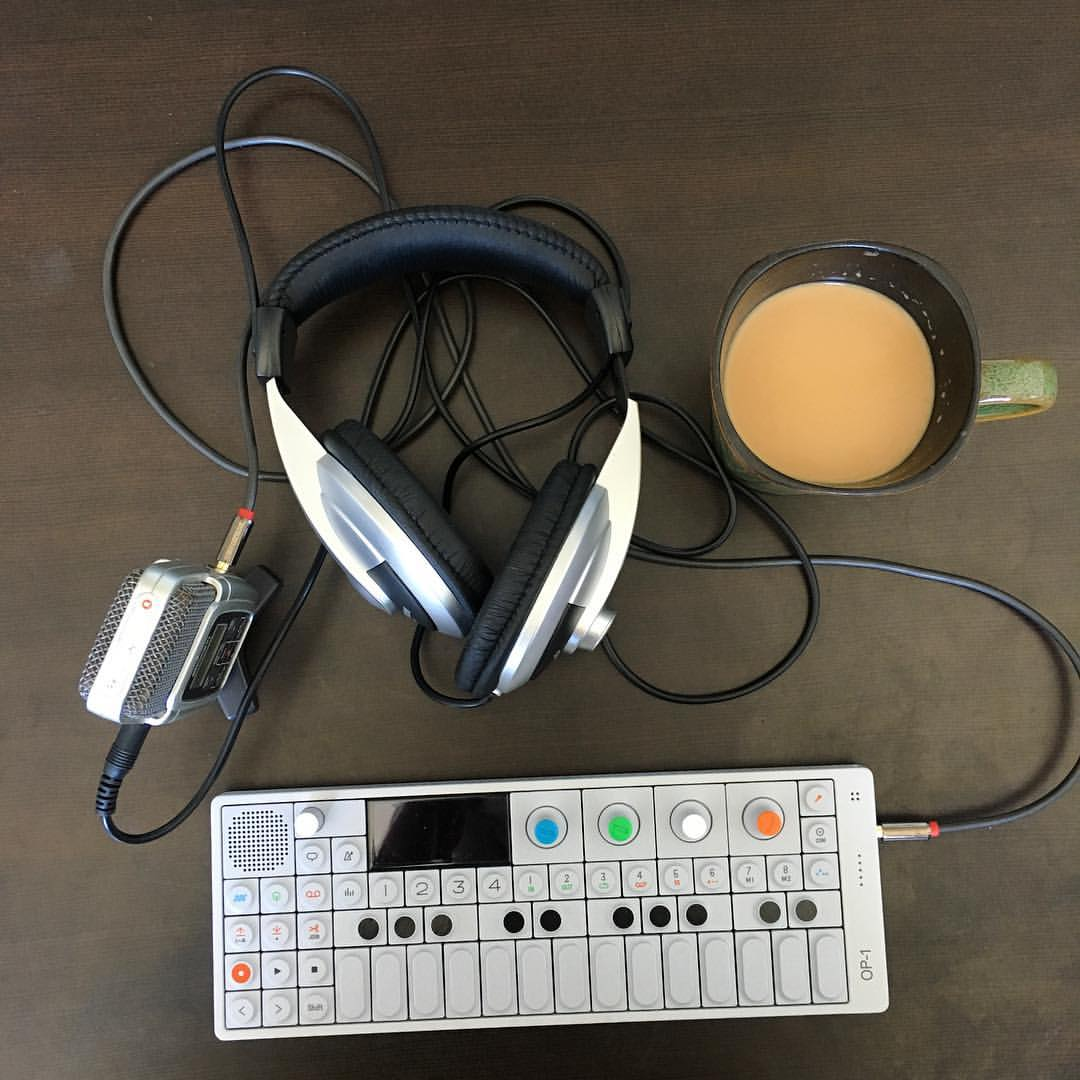
The OP-1 by Teenage Engineering

In 2012, Teenage Engineering introduced several "accessories" for the OP-1. These can be used to manipulate the unit's macro effect knobs. One of the accessories makes the OP-1 compatible with Lego gears and motors, which can be used to mechanically modulate low-frequency oscillators and other effects.

The OP-1 became unavailable for a period from late 2018 to early 2019 due to Teenage Engineering exhausting their stock of the AMOLED display screen. Due to rumors that the synthesizer had been permanently discontinued, the resell value of the OP-1 dramatically increased to surpass its original retail price. In February, Teenage Engineering announced that they would resume production of the OP-1; however, the retail price increased by approximately 35% to cover the new parts and redesigned hardware. The price increase was met with criticism due to a perception of poor resource planning.

== Features ==
=== Sound synthesis ===
The OP-1 includes eleven synthesis engines. For each engine, the OP-1's four knobs act as different macro controllers. In addition to a sampler, the OP-1 is preloaded with sampled drum hits. The synthesizer is monotimbral, with six voices of polyphony. It also includes an FM radio, which can be recorded into the sampler or used to modulate effects. The operating system was updated in 2014 adding additional effects and features.

The OP-1's eleven synthesis engines are FM, Cluster, Digital, DNA, DSynth, Dr Wave, String, Phase, Pulse, Sampler, and Voltage. Each is represented by a different graphic on the display screen. The FM engine is a simple FM synthesizer. The Cluster engine produces a distorted sound reminiscent of the Roland JP-8000 supersaw. DNA is a noise generator. Dr Wave resembles the sound of a talk box. Digital provides ring modulation and wave shape parameters to distort the sound signal. String creates string instrument emulation, ranging from bass to string pads. Pulse is a square wave engine. Phase provides two pulse waves that can be modulated and distorted. DSynth provides a dual oscillator synthesizer with multiple filter types. Voltage is a multi-oscillator synthesizer. The Sampler interface is a sampler, which can take input from the OP-1's built-in microphone, an external audio input, or the built-in FM radio.

=== Display screen ===
One of the key features of the OP-1 is its 320 x 160-pixel OLED display, which shows a graphical representation of the device's current mode. Although some of the displays use traditional symbols, such as the fairly straightforward ADSR envelope, others use more literal or unconventional graphics. For example, the "punch" effect (a low-pass filter) is represented by a line art illustration of a boxer.

=== Keyboard ===
The OP-1 has a fixed-velocity keyboard with 24 keys. Arrow keys are provided to transpose up or down octaves while in synthesizer or drum mode. Four octave shifts up and four shifts down are available giving the user a total range of ten octaves.

== Reception ==
Reception for the OP-1 was largely positive, citing its powerful synthesizer engines and unconventional format and design. However, it has received some criticism for its small size and simplicity, which make it resemble a toy. It also lacks velocity sensitivity, making it minimally expressive.

The OP-1 won one of Sweden's Design S Awards in 2012. The award committee described the OP-1 as "A technological product which through a clever colour scheme and fantastic graphics is intuitive, easily accessible and incredibly inviting. Music and machine in one". In 2014 it was awarded second prize in Georgia Tech's Margaret Guthman Musical Instrument Competition.

The San Francisco Museum of Modern Art includes an OP-1, donated by Teenage Engineering, in its permanent collection.

Musicians who have used the OP-1 include Amason, Beck, Depeche Mode, Jean-Michel Jarre, Tourist, Chvrches, Justin Vernon of Bon Iver, Efrim Menuck of Godspeed You! Black Emperor, and Ivan Dorn.
