= Baidu Raven =

Brand of smart speakers by Baidu

Raven is a brand of smart speakers, developed by Chinese web services company Baidu. The devices connect to the voice-controlled intelligent personal assistant service DuerOS. The products are a result of Baidu's acquisition of Raven Tech in February 2017. The Raven H went on sale in December 2017, the first of three planned products under the brand.

== Products ==
=== Raven H ===
The Raven H is a smart speaker consisting of eight metal plates. The top detachable orange metal plate is capable of rising up and down, as well as a LED display touch controller. DuerOS is capable of voice interaction, music playback, providing weather, and hailing a vehicle from Didi Chuxing on the device. It was first introduced in November 2017 at the annual Baidu World conference in Beijing. On board, the device has a Tymphany speaker. In China, the device became available in December 2017 for RMB 1,699.

=== Raven R ===
The Raven R is a planned smart speaker with six moveable joints, used to perform simple function and express emotions on an LED display.

=== Raven Q ===
The Raven Q is a planned home robot that will be able to move around a house, in addition to acting as a virtual assistant.
