= Sony Cyber-shot DSC-QX10 =

Ultra-compact camera by Sony

Overview
- Maker: Sony
- Type: Lens-style Compact Camera

Lens
- Lens: Sony G Lens (25 - 250 mm equivalent)
- F-numbers: f/3.5 (wide) - f/6.3 (telephoto)

Sensor/medium
- Sensor: Sony Exmor R™
- Sensor type: Backside-Illuminated (BSI) CMOS
- Sensor size: 6.17 x 4.55 mm (1/2.3 inch)
- Sensor maker: Sony
- Maximum resolution: 5184 x 3888 (18.2 megapixels)
- Film speed: ISO 100 - 3200
- Recording medium: microSD, microSDHC, microSDXC, MemoryStick Micro card; hybrid slot

Shutter
- Shutter speeds: 1/1600s to 4s
- Continuous shooting: 10 frames per second

Image processing
- Image processor: Sony Bionz X™
- White balance: No

General
- Dimensions: 62.4×61.8×33.3 mm (2.46×2.43×1.31 in)
- Weight: 105 g (4 oz) (including the battery)

The Sony Cyber-shot DSC-QX10 is an ultra-compact, mobile device-mountable lens-style compact camera manufactured by Sony. Announced on September 3, 2014, the QX10 is one of Sony's "Smart Lens" cameras, alongside the QX1, QX30 and QX100 which are designed to be specifically used with a smartphone. It has a 1/2.3 inch backside-illuminated Exmor R CMOS sensor with 18.2 effective megapixels, sitting behind an ƒ/3.5 (wide) to ƒ/6.3 (telephoto) Sony G Lens. It has a 10x lossless optical zoom in a compact pancake lens-style body.

== Specification ==
=== Technical specifications ===
Sensor	
Sensor Type	1/2.3 type (7.76mm) Exmor R CMOS sensor, aspect ratio 4:3
Number of Pixel (Effective)	Approx. 18.2 Megapixels
Number of Pixel (Gross)	Approx. 18.9 Megapixels
Lens	
Lens Type	Sony G Lens, 9 elements in 7 groups (including 4 aspheric elements)
F Number (max. Aperture)	F3.3 (W) – 5.9 (T)
Focal Length	f=4.45-44.5mm
Focus Range (from the front of Lens)	AF approx. 5 cm to infinity (W), approx. 150 cm to infinity (T)
Optical Zoom	10x
Digital Zoom	N/A
Aperture Type	Iris diaphragm (5 blades)
Focal Length (f=35mm format equivalent)	Still images 3:2 f=25–250 mm, Still images 16:9 f=27.5-,275 mm, Movie16:9 f=27.5–385 mm (SteadyShot Active Mode)
LCD	
Screen Type	Segment LCD
Camera	
Image Processing Engine	BIONZ
Steadyshot	Still Images: Optical; Movies:Active Mode, Optical type with electronic compensation
Focus Mode	Single-shot AF, Touch AF, Multi Point AF
Focus Area	Multi Point AF
Light Metering Mode	Multi Pattern
Exposure Compensation	+/-2.0 EV, 1/3 EV step
ISO Sensitivity(Still Images)	ISO100-3200 (iAuto), ISO100-12800*4 (Superior Auto), Auto/100/200/400/800/1600/3200 (Program Auto)
ISO Sensitivity (Movie)	Auto (ISO 100-1000 equivalent)
Minimum Illumination (Movie)	Auto: 20 lux (Shutter Speed 1/15)
White Balance Modes	Auto, Daylight, Shade, Cloudy, Incandescent, Fluor (White Balance 0), Fluor (White Balance 1), Flour (White Balance 2)
Shutter Speed	iAuto (4-1/1600), Program Auto (1-1/1600)
Aperture	iAuto (F3.3/F8.0 (W)), Program Auto (F3.3/F8.0 (W))
Image Control	Quality (Fine/Standard)
Dynamic Range Functions	Dynamic Range Optimizer
Shooting Modes	Intelligent Auto, Superior Auto, Program Auto, Movie
Self Timer	2-10sec. delay
Shooting Functions	Face Detection
Number of Recording Scenes	Still images: Superior Auto 44, Intelligent Auto 33; Movie: 44
Recording	
Compatible Recording Media	Memory Stick Micro, Memory Stick Micro (Mark2), microSD memory card, microSDHC memory card, microSDXC memory card
Recording Format	Still images: JPEG; Movies: MP4
Colour Space/Format	Still Image: sRGB; Movies Mode: NTSC
Recording Resolutions	Still Image: 4:3 mode: 18 M (4,896 x 3672)/5 M (2,592 x 1,944), 16:9 mode: 13 M (4,896 x 2,752)/2 M (1,920 x 1,080); Movies: MP4; 16M (1,920 x 1080/30 fps)
Interface	
Input And Output Terminals	Multi/Micro USB Terminal (8), Hi-Speed USB (USB2.0)
NFC®	Yes (NFC forum Type 3 Tag compatible)
Wi-Fi®	YES
Wi-Fi® Connectivity	NFC One-touch functionality, Wi-Fi Connect
Power	
Power Source	DC 3.6V(Supplied battery), DC 5.0V(AC adapter)
Battery System	Rechargeable Battery Pack Sony NP-BN
Power Consumption (Camera Mode)	Approx. 1.1W
USB Charging	YES
USB Power Mode	YES
Battery Life	Still images: approx. 220 / approx. 110min *Movie (actual shooting): approx. 25min. *Movies (continuous shooting) : approx. 65min. (In [MP4 28M PS] mode, max. continuous shooting time is approx. 15 min. and max. file size is 2GB.)
Supplied Battery Pack	Sony Rechargeable Battery Pack NP-BN.
Others	
Operating temperature	Approx. 0–40 °C (32–104 °F)
Dimensions (W x H x D)	Approx. 62.4 x 61.8 x 33.3 mm
Weight	Approx. 90 g (Body only), Approx. 105 g (With battery and Memory Stick micro)

== See also ==
- Sony SmartShot
- Sony Cyber-shot

Family	Level	Format	'10	2011		2012	2013	2014	2015	2016	2017	2018	2019	2020	2021	2022	2023	2024	2025	2026
Alpha (α)	Indust	FF																ILX-LR1 ^{●}		
Alpha (α)	Cine line	FF													_{m} FX6 ^{●}					
Alpha (α)	Cine line	FF													_{m} FX3 ^{AT●}					
Alpha (α)	Cine line	FF																		_{m} FX2 ^{AT●}
Alpha (α)	Flag	FF													_{m} α1 ^{FT●}				_{m} α1 II ^{FAT●}	
Alpha (α)	Speed	FF										_{m} α9 ^{FT●}			_{m} α9 II ^{FT●}				_{m} α9 III ^{FAT●}	
Alpha (α)	Sens	FF							_{m} α7S ^{●}	_{m} α7S II ^{F●}					_{m} α7S III ^{AT●}					
Alpha (α)	Hi-Res	FF						_{m} α7R ^{●}		_{m} α7R II ^{F●}		_{m} α7R III ^{FT●}		_{m} α7R IV ^{FT●}			_{m} α7R V ^{FAT●}			
Alpha (α)	Basic	FF						_{m} α7 ^{F●}	_{m} α7 II ^{F●}				_{m} α7 III ^{FT●}			_{m} α7 IV ^{AT●}				
Alpha (α)	Compact	FF																_{m} α7CR ^{AT●}		
Alpha (α)	Compact	FF													_{m} α7C ^{AT●}			_{m} α7C II ^{AT●}		
Alpha (α)	Vlog	FF																_{m} ZV-E1 ^{AT●}		
Alpha (α)	Cine	APS-C															_{m} FX30 ^{AT●}			
Alpha (α)	Adv	APS-C			_{s} NEX-7 ^{F●}						_{m} α6500 ^{FT●}			_{m} α6600 ^{FT●}				_{m} α6700 ^{AT●}		
Alpha (α)	Mid-range	APS-C				_{m} NEX-6 ^{F●}					_{m} α6300 ^{F●}		_{m} α6400 ^{F+T●}							
Alpha (α)	Mid-range	APS-C						_{m} α6000 ^{F●}						_{m} α6100 ^{FT●}						
Alpha (α)	Vlog	APS-C														_{m} ZV-E10 ^{AT●}			_{m} ZV-E10 II ^{AT●}	
Alpha (α)	Entry-level	APS-C	NEX-5 ^{F●}	NEX-5N ^{FT●}		NEX-5R ^{F+T●}	NEX-5T ^{F+T●}		α5100 ^{F+T●}											
Alpha (α)	Entry-level	APS-C	NEX-3 ^{F●}	NEX-C3 ^{F●}		NEX-F3 ^{F+●}	NEX-3N ^{F+●}	α5000 ^{F+●}												
DSLR-style		APS-C					_{m} α3000 ^{●}		_{m} α3500 ^{●}											
SmartShot		APS-C							QX1 ^{M●}											
CineAlta	Cine line	FF										VENICE				VENICE 2				
CineAlta	Cine line	FF																BURANO		
XDCAM	Cine line	FF												_{m} FX9						
XDCAM	Docu	S35							_{m} FS7		_{m} FS7 II									
XDCAM	Mobile	S35								_{m} FS5			_{m} FS5 II							
NXCAM	Pro	S35		NEX-FS100		NEX-FS700	NEX-FS700R													
NXCAM	APS-C					NEX-EA50														
Handycam	FF					_{m} NEX-VG900														
Handycam	APS-C		_{s} NEX-VG10		_{s} NEX-VG20	_{m} NEX-VG30														
Security		FF									SNC-VB770									
Security		FF									UMC-S3C									
Family	Level	Format																		
Family	Level	Format	'10	2011		2012	2013	2014	2015	2016	2017	2018	2019	2020	2021	2022	2023	2024	2025	2026
