= Segmented liquid-crystal display =

Type of liquid-crystal display

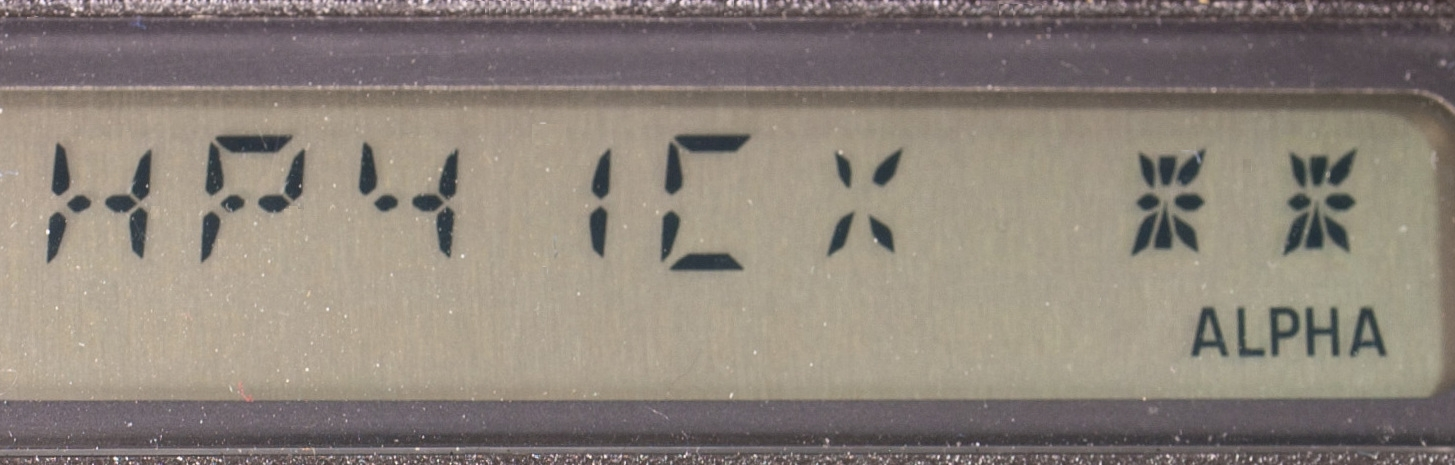
A segmented LCD in a calculator

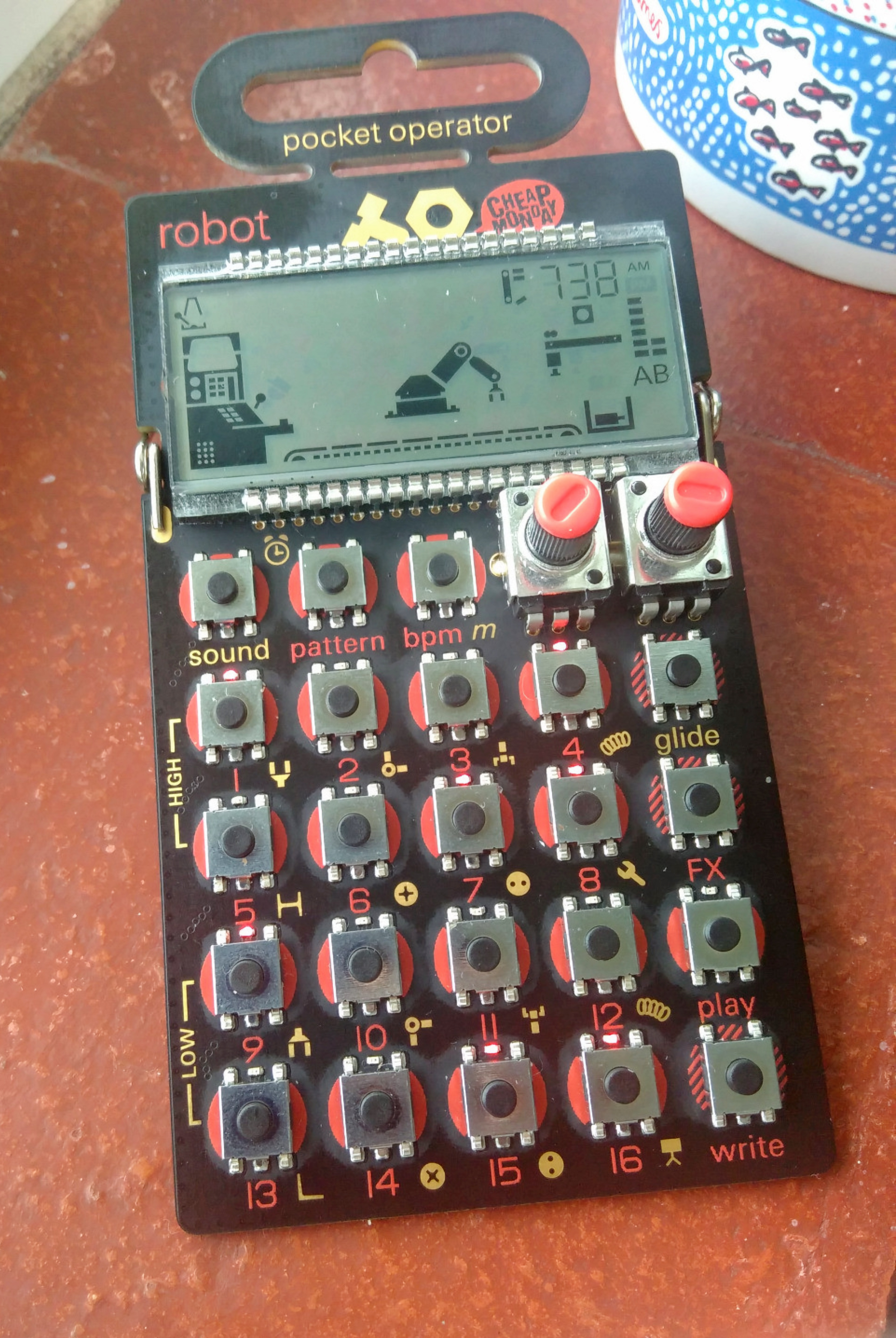
Segmented LCD in a Pocket Operator, showing various shapes of segments

A segmented liquid-crystal display (segmented LCD) is a type of liquid-crystal display commonly used for showing numerical or limited character information, primarily in devices like calculators and digital watches.

Segmented LCDs often display information in a one-line format. They can have 7-segment digits, or 14- or 16-segment characters. Segments can be arbitrary shapes and sizes.

Segmented LCDs were built into the Game & Watch series of handheld electronic games.

HP produced segmented LCDs for the HP-41C series of calculators.

== Construction ==
8- and 16-segment LCDs are made as a stack of two glass sheets, each patterned with transparent electrodes, typically using indium tin oxide (ITO). Liquid crystal is filled between the two sheets. Typically, the rear glass is all one common electrode.

=== Layers ===
Layers of a reflective twisted nematic liquid crystal display

1. Polarizing filter film with a vertical axis to polarize light as it enters.
2. Glass substrate with ITO electrodes. The shapes of these electrodes will determine the shapes that will appear when the LCD is switched ON. Vertical ridges etched on the surface are smooth.
3. Twisted nematic liquid crystal. It normally rotates the light's polarization by 90°. But if the surrounding electrodes are charged, the light's polarization won't be rotated.
4. Glass substrate with common electrode film (ITO) with horizontal ridges to line up with the horizontal filter.
5. Polarizing filter film with a horizontal axis. Light whose polarization was rotated by the liquid crystal will pass through, but light that wasn't rotated will be blocked.
6. Reflective surface to send light back to viewer. (In a backlit LCD, this layer is replaced or complemented with a light source.)

== History ==
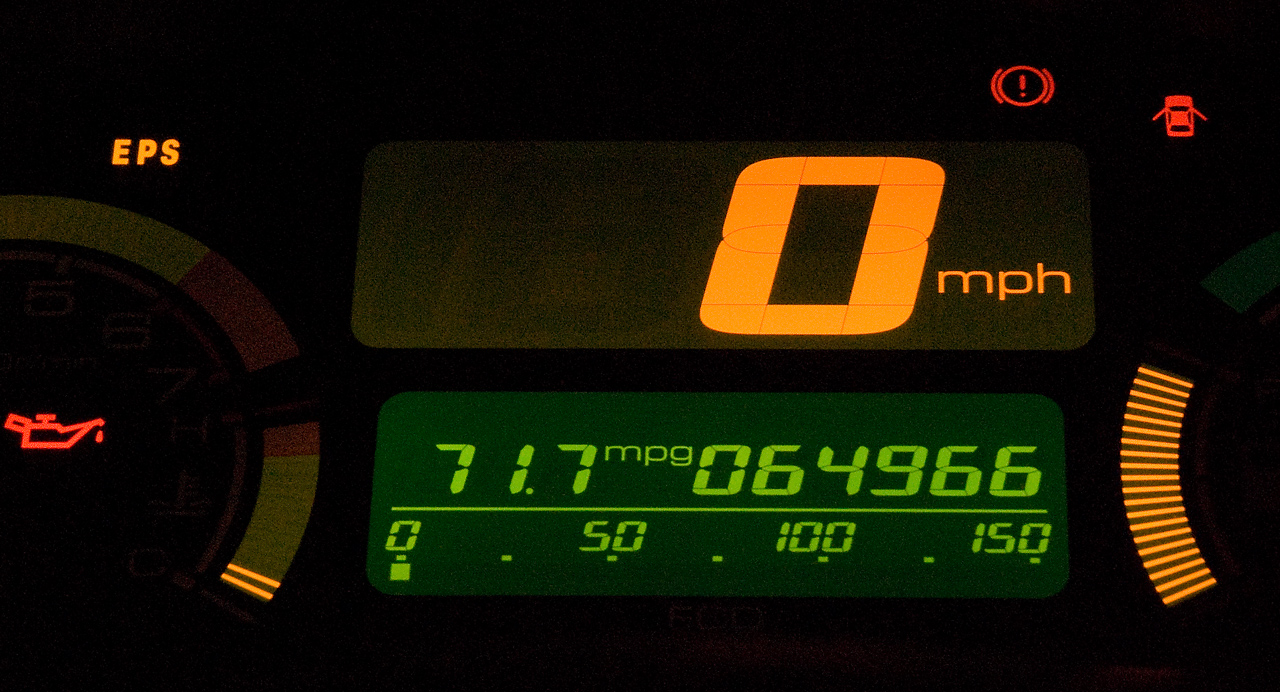
Segmented LCD, showing a variety of segment sizes and shapes

The first liquid crystal display was developed in the 1960s by a team of engineers led by George Heilmeier.
