= List of cameras which provide geotagging =

There are several methods to create a Geotagged photograph (see also Geotagging). The application of this is to allow photo management applications to use this information to manage images.

Some of the existing methods for embedding location information to a captured image are:

- A camera that has built-in GPS;
- A camera with interface for an external GPS (the interface could be a physical connector or a bluetooth adapter to a remote GPS logger, or WiFi and an app to allow the camera to sync GPS from a smartphone);
- A storage media (CF or SD card) that has GPS or WiFi built-in (products like Eye-Fi provides cards like this, only supported for some cameras).

== List of cameras ==
Manufacturer	Camera model	Camera type	Year	Method of geotagging
Altek	Digital Camera	Compact	2008	Built-in GPS
Canon	EOS-1D X Mark II	DSLR	2016	Built-in GPS
Canon	EOS-1D X Mark III	DSLR	2020	Built-in GPS
Canon	EOS 5D Mark III	DSLR	2012	External (Canon GP-E2)
Canon	EOS 5D Mark IV	DSLR	2016	Built-in GPS
Canon	EOS 6D	DSLR	2012	Built-in GPS
Canon	EOS 6D Mark II	DSLR	2017	Built-in GPS
Canon	EOS 7D Mark II	DSLR	2014	Built-in GPS
Canon	EOS 70D	DSLR	2013	External (Canon GP-E2)
Canon	EOS 77D	DSLR	2017	External (Canon GP-E2)
Canon	EOS 80D	DSLR	2016	External (Canon GP-E2)
Canon	PowerShot S100	Compact	2011	Built-in GPS
Canon	PowerShot SX230 HS	Compact	2011	Built-in GPS
Canon	PowerShot SX260 HS	Compact	2012	Built-in GPS
Canon	PowerShot SX280 HS	Compact	2013	Built-in GPS
Canon	PowerShot D20	Rugged	2013	Built-in GPS
Canon	PowerShot D30	Rugged	2014	Built-in GPS
Casio	Exilim EX-H20G	Compact	2010	Built-in GPS
Fujifilm	FinePix F550EXR	Compact	2011	Built-in GPS
Fujifilm	FinePix F600EXR	Compact	2011	Built-in GPS
Fujifilm	FinePix F770EXR	Compact	2012	Built-in GPS
Fujifilm	FinePix S5 Pro	DSLR	2007	External (Barcode reader/GPS unit)
Fujifilm	FinePix XP30	Rugged	2011	Built-in GPS
Fujifilm	FinePix XP150	Rugged	2012	Built-in GPS
Hasselblad	X1D-50c	Medium Format Mirrorless	2016	External (Hasselblad X1D Hot Shoe GPS Module)
Hasselblad	X1D II 50C	Medium Format Mirrorless	2019	Built-in GPS
Leica	M (Typ 240)	Digital Rangefinder	2012	External (Leica Multifunctional Handgrip M)
Leica	M10-D	Digital Rangefinder	2018	External (Leica Visoflex electronic accessory viewfinder)
Leica	M10-P	Digital Rangefinder	2018	External (Leica Visoflex electronic accessory viewfinder)
Leica	S	Medium Format	2012	Built-in GPS
Leica	SL (Typ 601)	Mirrorless Full-Frame	2015	Built-in GPS
Leica	TL2	MILC	2017	External (Leica Visoflex electronic accessory viewfinder)
Leica	V-Lux 20	Compact	2010	Built-in GPS
Leica	V-Lux 30	Compact	2011	Built-in GPS
Leica	V-Lux 40	Compact	2012	Built-in GPS
Nikon	Coolpix A	Compact	2013	External (Nikon GP-1, GP-1A)
Nikon	Coolpix S800c	Compact	2012	Built-in GPS
Nikon	Coolpix S810c	Compact	2014	Built-in GPS
Nikon	Coolpix S9300	Compact	2012	Built-in GPS
Nikon	Coolpix S9500	Compact	2013	Built-in GPS
Nikon	Coolpix S9700	Compact	2014	Built-in GPS
Nikon	Coolpix S9900	Compact	2015	Built-in GPS
Nikon	Coolpix P330	Compact	2013	Built-in GPS
Nikon	Coolpix P510	Bridge	2012	Built-in GPS
Nikon	Coolpix P520	Bridge	2013	Built-in GPS
Nikon	Coolpix P610	Bridge	2015	Built-in GPS
Nikon	Coolpix P900	Bridge	2015	Built-in GPS
Nikon	Coolpix P6000	Compact	2008	Built-in GPS
Nikon	Coolpix P7700	Compact	2012	External (Nikon GP-1, GP-1A)
Nikon	Coolpix P7800	Compact	2013	External (Nikon GP-1, GP-1A)
Nikon	D7000	DSLR	2010	External (Nikon GP-1, GP-1A)
Nikon	D7100	DSLR	2013	External (Nikon GP-1, GP-1A, many third party)
Nikon	D7200	DSLR	2015	External (Nikon GP-1, GP-1A, many third party)
Nikon	D5000	DSLR	2009	External (Nikon GP-1, GP-1A, many third party)
Nikon	D5100	DSLR	2011	External (Nikon GP-1, GP-1A, many third party)
Nikon	D5200	DSLR	2012	External (Nikon GP-1, GP-1A, many third party)
Nikon	D5300	DSLR	2013	Built-in GPS or external (Nikon GP-1, GP-1A, many third party)
Nikon	D5500	DSLR	2015	External (Nikon GP-1, GP-1A, many third party)
Nikon	D5600	DSLR	2016	External (Nikon GP-1, GP-1A, many third party)
Nikon	D3000	DSLR	2009	External (Nikon GP-1, GP-1A, many third party)
Nikon	D3100	DSLR	2010	External (Nikon GP-1, GP-1A, many third party)
Nikon	D3200	DSLR	2012	External (Nikon GP-1, GP-1A, many third party)
Nikon	D3300	DSLR	2014	External (Nikon GP-1, GP-1A, many third party)
Nikon	D3400	DSLR	2016	External (Nikon GP-1, GP-1A, many third party)
Nikon	D1H	DSLR	2001	External (RS-232C interface to a GPS receiver, such as Garmin GPS III, Garmin GPS III Plus, Garmin eTrek, Magellan ColorTrack, Magellan MAP 315 or Magellan MAP 330)
Nikon	D1X	DSLR	2001	External (RS-232C interface to a GPS receiver, such as Garmin GPS III, Garmin GPS III Plus, Garmin eTrek, Magellan ColorTrack, Magellan MAP 315 or Magellan MAP 330)
Nikon	D5	DSLR	2016	External (Nikon GP-1, GP-1A, many third party)
Nikon	D6	DSLR	2020	Built-in GPS
Nikon	Df	DSLR	2013	External (Nikon GP-1, GP-1A, many third party)
Nikon	D600	DSLR	2012	External (Nikon GP-1, GP-1A, many third party)
Nikon	D610	DSLR	2013	External (Nikon GP-1, GP-1A, many third party)
Nikon	D750	DSLR	2014	External (Nikon GP-1, GP-1A, many third party)
Nikon	D800, D800E	DSLR	2012	External (GP-1, AK-4NIII)
Nikon	D810, D810A	DSLR	2014	External (Nikon GP-1, GP-1A, Aokatec AK-4NIII)
Nikon	1 AW1	MILC	2013	Built-in GPS
Nikon	Coolpix AW100	Rugged	2011	Built-in GPS
Nikon	Coolpix AW110	Rugged	2013	Built-in GPS
Nikon	Coolpix AW120	Rugged	2014	Built-in GPS
Nikon	Coolpix AW130	Rugged	2015	Built-in GPS
Nikon	Coolpix W300	Rugged	2017	Built-in GPS
Nikon	Z9	MILC	2021	Built-in GPS
Olympus	OM-D E-M1 Mark III	MILC	2020	Wi-Fi GPS log transfer via Olympus's smartphone app
Olympus	OM-D E-M5 Mark III	MILC	2019	Wi-Fi GPS log transfer via Olympus's smartphone app
Olympus	PEN E-PL10	MILC	2019	Wi-Fi GPS log transfer via Olympus's smartphone app
Olympus	OM-D E-M1X	MILC	2019	Built-in GPS
Olympus	PEN E-PL9	MILC	2018	Wi-Fi GPS log transfer via Olympus's smartphone app
Olympus	OM-D E-M10 Mark III	MILC	2017	Wi-Fi GPS log transfer via Olympus's smartphone app
Olympus	OM-D E-M1 Mark II	MILC	2016	Wi-Fi GPS log transfer via Olympus's smartphone app
Olympus	PEN E-PL8	MILC	2016	Wi-Fi GPS log transfer via Olympus's smartphone app
Olympus	PEN F	MILC	2016	Wi-Fi GPS log transfer via Olympus's smartphone app
Olympus	OM-D E-M10 Mark II	MILC	2015	Wi-Fi GPS log transfer via Olympus's smartphone app
Olympus	OM-D E-M5 Mark II	MILC	2015	Wi-Fi GPS log transfer via Olympus's smartphone app
Olympus	PEN E-PL7	MILC	2014	Wi-Fi GPS log transfer via Olympus's smartphone app
Olympus	OM-D E-M10	MILC	2014	Wi-Fi GPS log transfer via Olympus's smartphone app
Olympus	OM-D E-M1	MILC	2013	Wi-Fi GPS log transfer via Olympus's smartphone app
Olympus	PEN E-P5	MILC	2013	Wi-Fi GPS log transfer via Olympus's smartphone app
Olympus	SH-25MR	Compact	2012	Built-in GPS
Olympus	Tough TG-810	Rugged	2011	Built-in GPS
Olympus	Tough TG-830	Rugged	2013	Built-in GPS
Olympus	Stylus Tough TG-860	Rugged	2015	Built-in GPS
Olympus	Stylus TG-870 Tough	Rugged	2016	Built-in GPS
Olympus	Tough TG-1 iHS	Rugged	2012	Built-in GPS
Olympus	Stylus TG-2 Tough	Rugged	2013	Built-in GPS
Olympus	Stylus TG-3 Tough	Rugged	2014	Built-in GPS
Olympus	Stylus TG-4 Tough	Rugged	2015	Built-in GPS
Olympus	Tough TG-5	Rugged	2017	Built-in GPS
Olympus	Tough TG-6	Rugged	2019	Built-in GPS
OM System	OM-1	MILC	2022	Bluetooth tethering to OM System's smartphone app
OM System	OM-3	MILC	2025	Bluetooth tethering to OM System's smartphone app
OM System	OM-5	MILC	2022	Bluetooth tethering to OM System's smartphone app
Panasonic	Lumix DMC-TS3 (Lumix DMC-FT3)	Rugged	2011	Built-in GPS
Panasonic	Lumix DMC-TS4 (Lumix DMC-FT4)	Rugged	2012	Built-in GPS
Panasonic	Lumix DMC-TS5 (Lumix DMC-FT5)	Rugged	2013	Built-in GPS
Panasonic	Lumix DMC-TS6 (Lumix DMC-FT6)	Rugged	2015	Built-in GPS
Panasonic	Lumix DMC-TZ10 (Lumix DMC-ZS7)	Compact	2010	Built-in GPS
Panasonic	Lumix DMC-TZ20 (Lumix DMC-ZS10 / Lumix DMC-TZ22)	Compact	2011	Built-in GPS
Panasonic	Lumix DMC-TZ30 (Lumix DMC-ZS20 / Lumix DMC-TZ31)	Compact	2012	Built-in GPS
Panasonic	Lumix DMC-TZ40 (Lumix DMC-ZS30)	Compact	2013	Built-in GPS
Panasonic	Lumix DMC-TZ60 (Lumix DMC-ZS40)	Compact	2014	Built-in GPS
Panasonic	Lumix DC-G9	MILC	2018	Bluetooth tethering to Panasonic's smartphone app
Pentax	Optio WG-1 GPS	Rugged	2011	Built-in GPS
Pentax	Optio WG-2 GPS	Rugged	2012	Built-in GPS
Pentax	WG-3 GPS	Rugged	2013	Built-in GPS
Pentax	K-3 II	DSLR	2015	Built-in GPS
Pentax	K-3 III	DSLR	2021	Wi-Fi GPS log transfer via Olympus's smartphone app
Pentax	K-1	DSLR	2016	Built-in GPS
Pentax	K-1 Mark II	DSLR	2018	Built-in GPS
Pentax	All DSLRs since 2010	DSLR		External (O-GPS1)
Polaroid	SC1630	Compact	2012	Built-in GPS
Ricoh	Caplio 500SE	Rugged	2007	External (GPS module (such as EKA Designs SE-2G or SE-2C) or Bluetooth connection to a Bluetooth GPS unit)
Ricoh	Caplio Pro G3	Compact	2005	External (CompactFlash WAAS GPS Card)
Ricoh	G700SE	Rugged	2010	External (Ricoh GP-1 GPS module)
Ricoh	G900	Rugged	2019	Built-in GPS
Ricoh	WG-4 GPS	Rugged	2014	Built-in GPS
Ricoh	WG-5 GPS	Rugged	2015	Built-in GPS
Ricoh	WG-6	Rugged	2019	Built-in GPS
Samsung	CL65 (ST1000)	Compact	2009	Built-in GPS
Samsung	Galaxy Camera 2	Compact	2014	Built-in GPS
Samsung	Galaxy NX	MILC	2013	Built-in GPS
Samsung	WB650 (HZ35W)	Compact	2010	Built-in GPS
Samsung	WB850F	Compact	2012	Built-in GPS
Sony	Alpha 55V (SLT-A55V)	DSLR	2010	Built-in GPS
Sony	Alpha 65V (SLT-A65V)	DSLR	2011	Built-in GPS
Sony	Alpha 77V (SLT-A77V)	DSLR	2011	Built-in GPS
Sony	Alpha 99V (SLT-A99V)	DSLR	2012	Built-in GPS
Sony	DSC-HX400V	Bridge	2014	Built-in GPS
Sony	DSC-HX200V	Bridge	2012	Built-in GPS
Sony	DSC-HX100V	Bridge	2011	Built-in GPS
Sony	DSC-HX90V	Compact	2015	Built-in GPS
Sony	DSC-HX60V	Compact	2014	Built-in GPS
Sony	DSC-HX50V	Compact	2013	Built-in GPS
Sony	DSC-HX30V	Compact	2012	Built-in GPS
Sony	DSC-HX20V	Compact	2012	Built-in GPS
Sony	DSC-HX10V	Compact	2012	Built-in GPS
Sony	DSC-HX9V	Compact	2011	Built-in GPS
Sony	DSC-HX7V	Compact	2011	Built-in GPS
Sony	DSC-HX5V	Compact	2010	Built-in GPS
Sony	Cyber-shot DSC-TX100V	Compact	2011	Built-in GPS
Sony	Cyber-shot DSC-TX200V	Compact	2012	Built-in GPS

Type	Sensor	Class	00	01	02	03	04	05	06	07	08	09	10	11	12	13	14	15	16	17	18	19	20	21	22	23	24	25	26
DSLR	Full-frame	Flagship				1Ds		1Ds Mk II			1Ds Mk III					1D C													
DSLR	Full-frame	Flagship				1Ds		1Ds Mk II			1Ds Mk III				1D X					1D X Mk II ^{T}			1D X Mk III ^{T}						
DSLR	APS-H	Flagship			1D			1D Mk II	1D Mk II N		1D Mk III		1D Mk IV																
DSLR	Full-frame	Professional																	5DS / 5DS R										
DSLR	Full-frame	Professional							5D			_{x} 5D Mk II			_{x} 5D Mk III					5D Mk IV ^{T}									
DSLR	Full-frame	Advanced														_{x} 6D					_{x} 6D Mk II ^{AT}								
DSLR	APS-C	Advanced											_{x} 7D					_{x} 7D Mk II											
DSLR	APS-C	Mid-range						20Da								_{x} 60Da ^{A}													
DSLR	APS-C	Mid-range		D30	D60	10D		20D	30D		40D	_{x} 50D		_{x} 60D ^{A}			_{x} 70D ^{AT}		80D ^{AT}				90D ^{AT}						
DSLR	APS-C	Mid-range																	760D ^{AT}		77D ^{AT}								
DSLR	APS-C	Entry-level					300D	350D		400D	450D	_{x} 500D	_{x} 550D	_{x} 600D ^{A}		_{x} 650D ^{AT}	_{x} 700D ^{AT}		_{x} 750D ^{AT}		800D ^{AT}			850D ^{AT}					
DSLR	APS-C	Entry-level															_{x} 100D ^{T}		_{x} 200D ^{AT}				250D ^{AT}						
DSLR	APS-C	Entry-level										1000D		_{x} 1100D			_{x} 1200D			1300D		2000D							
DSLR	APS-C	Value																				4000D							
Early models			Canon EOS DCS 5 (1995); Canon EOS DCS 3 (1995); Canon EOS DCS 1 (1995); Canon EOS D2000 (1998); Canon EOS D6000 (1998)																										
Type	Sensor	Spec																											
Type	Sensor	Spec	00	01	02	03	04	05	06	07	08	09	10	11	12	13	14	15	16	17	18	19	20	21	22	23	24	25	26

Sensor	Class	1999	2000	2001	2002	2003	2004	2005	2006	2007	2008	2009	2010	2011	2012	2013	2014	2015	2016	2017	2018	2019	2020	2021	2022	2023	2024	2025	2026
FX (Full-frame)	Flagship											D3X ^{−P}																	
FX (Full-frame)	Flagship										D3 ^{−P}		D3S ^{−P}		D4		D4S		D5^{T}					D6^{T}					
FX (Full-frame)	Professional											D700 ^{−P}			D800/D800E			D810/D810A			D850 ^{AT}								
FX (Full-frame)	Enthusiast																Df												
FX (Full-frame)	Enthusiast																	D750 ^{A}					D780 ^{AT}						
FX (Full-frame)	Enthusiast															D600	D610												
DX (APS-C)	Flagship		D1^{−E}	D1X^{−E}				D2X^{−E}		D2Xs^{−E}																			
DX (APS-C)	Flagship		D1^{−E}	D1H ^{−E}			D2H^{−E}	D2Hs^{−E}																					
DX (APS-C)	Professional				D100^{−E}				D200^{−E}		D300^{−P}		D300S^{−P}						D500 ^{AT}										
DX (APS-C)	Enthusiast						D70^{−E}		D70s^{−E}	D80^{−E}		D90^{−E}		D7000 ^{−P}			D7100	D7200			D7500 ^{AT}								
DX (APS-C)	Upper-entry								D50^{−E}	D40X^{−E*}	D60^{−E*}		D5000^{A−P*}		D5100^{A−P*}	D5200^{A−P*}	D5300^{A*}	D5500^{AT*}		D5600 ^{AT*}									
DX (APS-C)	Entry-level									D40^{−E*}			D3000^{−E*}	D3100^{−P*}		D3200^{−P*}	D3300^{*}			D3400^{*}		D3500^{*}							
Early models		SVC (prototype; 1986); QV-1000C (1988); NASA F4 (1991); E2/E2S (1995); E2N/E2NS (1996); E3/E3S (1998)																											
Sensor	Class																												
Sensor	Class	1999	2000	2001	2002	2003	2004	2005	2006	2007	2008	2009	2010	2011	2012	2013	2014	2015	2016	2017	2018	2019	2020	2021	2022	2023	2024	2025	2026

Type	Sensor	Class	2003	2004	2005	2006		2007	2008	2009	2010	2011	2012	2013	2014	2015	2016	2017	2018	2019	2020	2021	2022	2023	2024	2025
DSLR	MF	Professional										645D				645Z										
DSLR	FF	Professional																K-1		K-1 II						
DSLR	APS-C	High-end															K-3 II						K-3 III			
DSLR	APS-C	High-end													K-3											
DSLR	APS-C	Advanced									K-7	K-5		K-5 II / K-5 IIs												
DSLR	APS-C	Advanced		*ist D			K10D		K20D									KP								
DSLR	APS-C	Midrange					K100D	100DS	K200D					K-30	K-50			K-70						KF		
DSLR	APS-C	Entry-level			*ist DS	*ist DS2						K-r			K-500	K-S2										
DSLR	APS-C	Entry-level			*ist DL	DL2	K110D			K-m/K2000	K-x					K-S1										
MILC	APS-C	K-mount											K-01													
MILC	1/1.7"	Q-mount													Q7											
MILC	1/1.7"	Q-mount														Q-S1										
MILC	1/2.3"	Q-mount											Q	Q10												
DSLR	Prototypes		MZ-D (2000); 645D Prototype (2006); AP 50th Anniv. (2007)																							
Type	Sensor	Class																								
Type	Sensor	Class	2003	2004	2005	2006		2007	2008	2009	2010	2011	2012	2013	2014	2015	2016	2017	2018	2019	2020	2021	2022	2023	2024	2025

== See also ==
- List of digital camera brands

== Smartphone apps providing geotagging ==
In addition to dedicated cameras, many smartphones can geotag photos using built-in GPS and third-party apps. Examples include:

- GPS Map Camera – An Android app that adds GPS coordinates and location stamps to photo metadata and image overlays.
