= Sony DSC =

Sony DSC may refer to:

- Sony Cyber-shot, family of fixed-lens digital compact cameras by Sony
- Sony SmartShot, family of lens-style digital cameras by Sony
- SONY DSC, Exif data of some Sony Cyber-shot digital cameras
