= PMB =

PMB can stand for:

- Phenylmagnesium bromide, a reagent
- p-Methoxybenzyl, in the benzyl group
- Nickname of Pietermaritzburg, KwaZulu-Natal, South Africa
- Picture Motion Browser, Sony software
- PMB (software), a library system
- Postmenopausal bleeding, a menstrual condition
- Print Measurement Bureau, a Canadian media surveying company
- Private mail bag, a service provided by some postal authorities
- Private mailbox at a commercial mail receiving agency
- Pro-Música Brasil, record label body
- Brazilian Woman's Party, brazilian right-wing party
- Pierre-Marc Bouchard (born 1984), Canadian ice hockey player
- Brazilian Music Award or Prêmio da Música Brasileira
- Philippine Mobile Belt, a tectonic boundary zone
