= Nikon D7500 =

Digital single-lens reflex camera

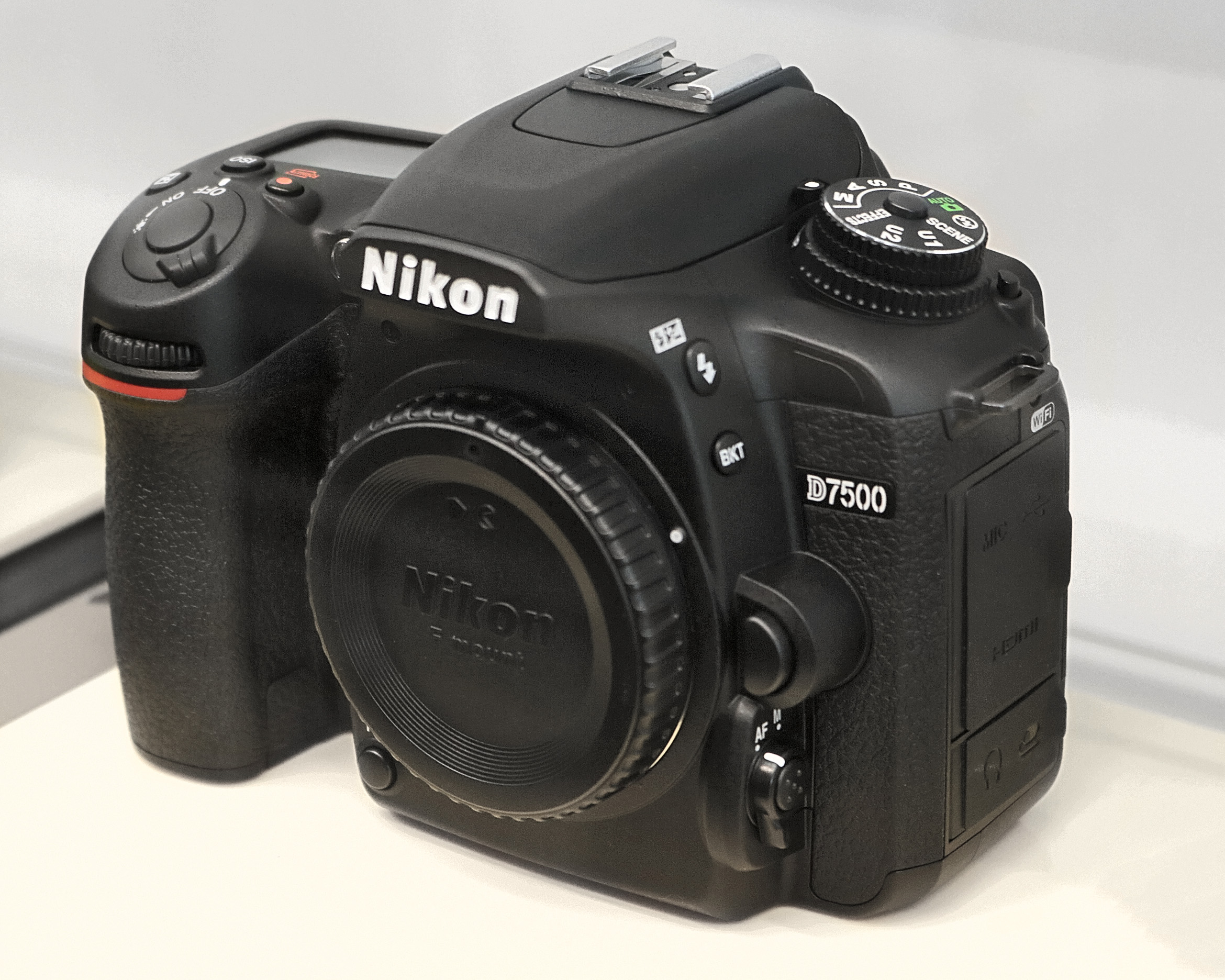

Overview
- Maker: Nikon
- Type: Digital single-lens reflex
- Released: 2 June 2017
- Intro price: US$1,249.95

Lens
- Lens mount: Nikon F-mount
- Lens: Interchangeable

Sensor/medium
- Sensor: Nikon DX format, 23.5 mm x 15.7 mm CMOS; 4.2 μm pixel size
- Maximum resolution: 5,568 × 3,712 (20.9 M pixels sensor)
- Film speed: 100–51,200 in 1, 1/2 or 1/3 EV steps (down to 50 and up to 1,640,000 as expansion)
- Recording medium: SD/SDHC/SDXC

Focusing
- Focus modes: Instant single-servo AF (S), continuous-servo AF (C), manual (M)
- Focus areas: 51 points, 15 cross-type sensors

Exposure/metering
- Exposure modes: Programmed Auto [P] with flexible program; Shutter-Priority Auto [S]; Aperture-Priority Auto [A]; Manual [M]
- Exposure metering: Three-mode through-the-lens (TTL) exposure metering

Flash
- Flash: Yes

Shutter
- Shutter: Electronically controlled vertical-travel focal plane shutter
- Shutter speed range: 30 s – 1/8000 s, bulb
- Continuous shooting: 8 frame/s, up to 50 frames (RAW)

Viewfinder
- Viewfinder: Optical, 100% frame coverage

Image processing
- Image processor: EXPEED 5

General
- Video recording: 4K up to 30 fps 1080p up to 60 fps
- LCD screen: 3.2-inch tilting TFT LCD with 922K dots with touchscreen
- Battery: EN-EL15a
- Weight: 640 g (23 oz) (1.41 lb) body only
- Latest firmware: 1.12 / 25 April 2024; 2 years ago
- Made in: Thailand

Chronology
- Predecessor: Nikon D7200

The Nikon D7500 is a 20.9-megapixel digital single-lens reflex camera using an APS-C sensor. It was announced by Nikon Corporation on 12 April 2017, and started shipping on 2 June 2017. It is the successor to the Nikon D7200 as Nikon's DX format midrange DSLR.

== Features ==
The D7500 uses the same sensor and processor as the Nikon D500, whereas other features previously available in the D7200 or D500 have been omitted (single SD card slot instead of two, and no Nikon battery grip). The D7500 is the first D7XXX series without metering support for old manual focus Nikon AI type (Non-CPU) lenses.

- Nikon DX format 20.9 megapixel CMOS sensor
- 4K UHD video in 30p, 25p, and 24p
- 1.5x field of view crop
- Viewfinder with 100% frame coverage and 0.94x magnification
- Nikon EXPEED5 image processor
- Monocoque design with composite carbon fiber with weather sealing against moisture and dust.
- Nikon F-mount lenses
- Active D-Lighting (three levels)
- 180K pixel RGB metering system.
- Retouch menu includes filter type, hue, crop, D-lighting, Mono (Black and White, Cyanotype or Sepia)
- Multi-CAM 3500FX II autofocus module with 51 sensors in normal mode with 15 cross-type sensors. Of these points, 1 will work with any lens/teleconverter combination with a maximum aperture of f/8 or larger.
- Focus points' low-light performance: -3EV 51 AF points 15 of which are cross-type
- Auto AF fine-tune achieves focus tuning in live view through the automatic setting of adjustment value with a few button operations.
- Live View Mode
- Built-in sensor cleaning (using ultrasound) helps to remove the dust from sensor
- 8 frame-per-second continuous shooting for up to 50 RAW images (14-bit lossless compressed RAW)
- 3.2 inch 922,000 dots tilting LCD touchscreen
- ISO 100–51,200, selectable in 1/3-, 1/2- or 1-stop increments. Additionally, ISO 50 to ISO 1,640,000 are available with ISO Boost.
- Selectable in-camera ISO noise reduction applied in post-processing.
- Built-in flash.
- File formats include JPEG, TIFF, NEF (Nikon's raw image format compressed and lossless compressed), and JPEG+NEF (JPEG size/quality selectable)
- Single memory card slot (SD / SDHC/ SDXC)
- Wi-Fi
  - The D7500 shipped with firmware that only allowed for Wi-Fi communications to work with Nikon's proprietary SnapBridge mobile application. This also applies to the other cameras of the same generation such as the D500, D850 and D5600. After some backlash from users, a firmware update released in May 2019 enabled Wi-Fi communications for third-party applications.

== Feature reductions ==
The following features, which are available for the D7200 and D500, and which typically target professional photography, have been removed, so that the D7500 is set off against the D500's and D7200's market segment:

- No battery grip will be available from Nikon nor from 3rd parties as an accessory, due to missing connectors. There are 3rd party workarounds depending on connecting a thin and fragile cable, where daily usage could damage the cable and its connector sockets easily.
- No dual memory card slot, which protected professionals against card failure losses
- No metering supported for older manual focus Nikkor AI (non-CPU) lenses
- No magnesium alloy used to strengthen the body internally, now substituted with "monocoque carbon fiber composite"
- No 24 Megapixels (6000x4000), now 20.7 (5568 x 3712) (also applies to the D500 having the same sensor as the D7500)

| Sensor | Class | '99 | '00 | '01 | '02 | '03 | '04 | '05 | '06 | '07 | '08 | '09 | '10 | '11 | '12 | '13 | '14 | '15 | '16 | '17 | '18 | '19 | '20 | '21 | '22 | '23 | '24 | '25 | '26 |
|---|---|---|---|---|---|---|---|---|---|---|---|---|---|---|---|---|---|---|---|---|---|---|---|---|---|---|---|---|---|
| FX (Full-frame) | Flagship | | | | | | | | | | | D3X ^{−P} | | | | | | | | | | | | | | | | | |
| FX (Full-frame) | Flagship | | | | | | | | | | D3 ^{−P} | | D3S ^{−P} | | D4 | | D4S | | D5^{T} | | | | | D6^{T} | | | | | |
| FX (Full-frame) | Professional | | | | | | | | | | | D700 ^{−P} | | | D800/D800E | | | D810/D810A | | | D850 ^{AT} | | | | | | | | |
| FX (Full-frame) | Enthusiast | | | | | | | | | | | | | | | | Df | | | | | | | | | | | | |
| FX (Full-frame) | Enthusiast | | | | | | | | | | | | | | | | | D750 ^{A} | | | | | D780 ^{AT} | | | | | | |
| FX (Full-frame) | Enthusiast | | | | | | | | | | | | | | | D600 | D610 | | | | | | | | | | | | |
| DX (APS-C) | Flagship | | D1^{−E} | D1X^{−E} | | | | D2X^{−E} | | D2Xs^{−E} | | | | | | | | | | | | | | | | | | | |
| DX (APS-C) | Flagship | | D1^{−E} | D1H ^{−E} | | | D2H^{−E} | D2Hs^{−E} | | | | | | | | | | | | | | | | | | | | | |
| DX (APS-C) | Professional | | | | D100^{−E} | | | | D200^{−E} | | D300^{−P} | | D300S^{−P} | | | | | | D500 ^{AT} | | | | | | | | | | |
| DX (APS-C) | Enthusiast | | | | | | D70^{−E} | | D70s^{−E} | D80^{−E} | | D90^{−E} | | D7000 ^{−P} | | | D7100 | D7200 | | | D7500 ^{AT} | | | | | | | | |
| DX (APS-C) | Upper-entry | | | | | | | | D50^{−E} | D40X^{−E*} | D60^{−E*} | | D5000^{A−P*} | | D5100^{A−P*} | D5200^{A−P*} | D5300^{A*} | D5500^{AT*} | | D5600 ^{AT*} | | | | | | | | | |
| DX (APS-C) | Entry-level | | | | | | | | | D40^{−E*} | | | D3000^{−E*} | D3100^{−P*} | | D3200^{−P*} | D3300^{*} | | | D3400^{*} | | D3500^{*} | | | | | | | |
| Early models | | SVC (prototype; 1986); QV-1000C (1988); NASA F4 (1991); E2/E2S (1995); E2N/E2NS (1996); E3/E3S (1998) | | | | | | | | | | | | | | | | | | | | | | | | | | | |
| Sensor | Class | | | | | | | | | | | | | | | | | | | | | | | | | | | | |
| Sensor | Class | '99 | '00 | '01 | '02 | '03 | '04 | '05 | '06 | '07 | '08 | '09 | '10 | '11 | '12 | '13 | '14 | '15 | '16 | '17 | '18 | '19 | '20 | '21 | '22 | '23 | '24 | '25 | '26 |
