= Cyber-shot =

Brand of Sony digital cameras introduced in 1996

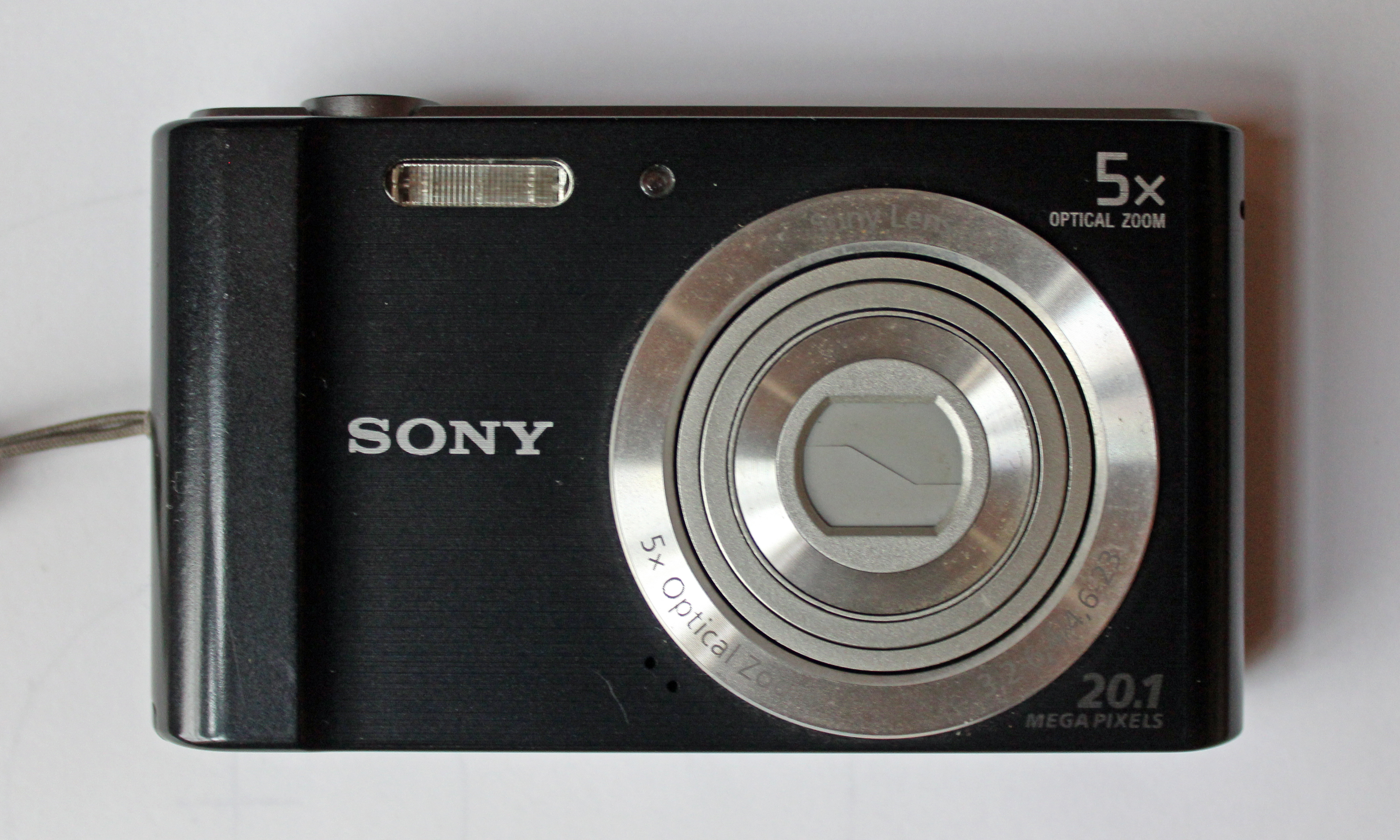
An example of a digital camera in the Cyber-shot line (W800)

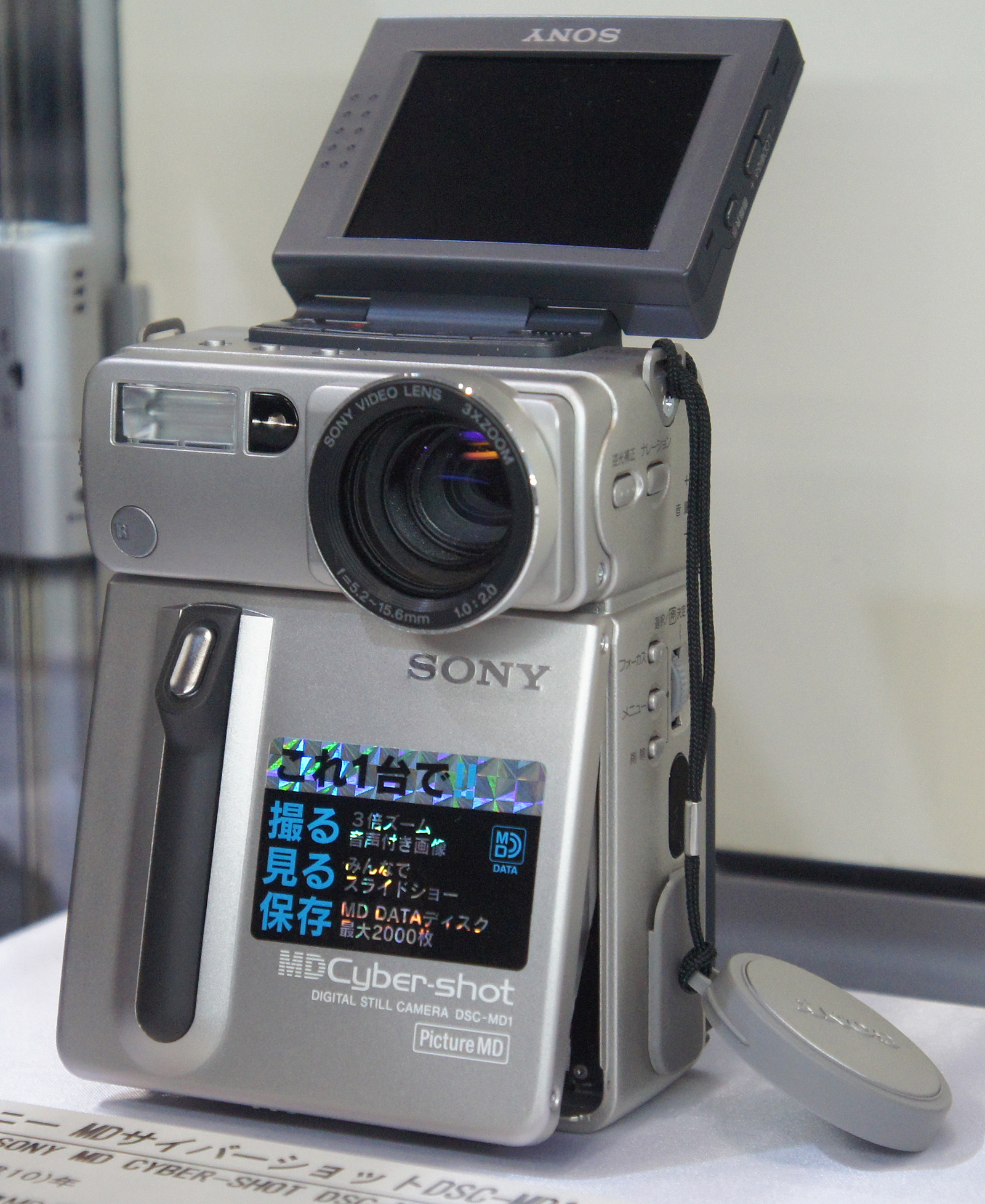
The Sony Cyber-shot DSC-MD1 was the only Cyber-shot using Mini Disc.

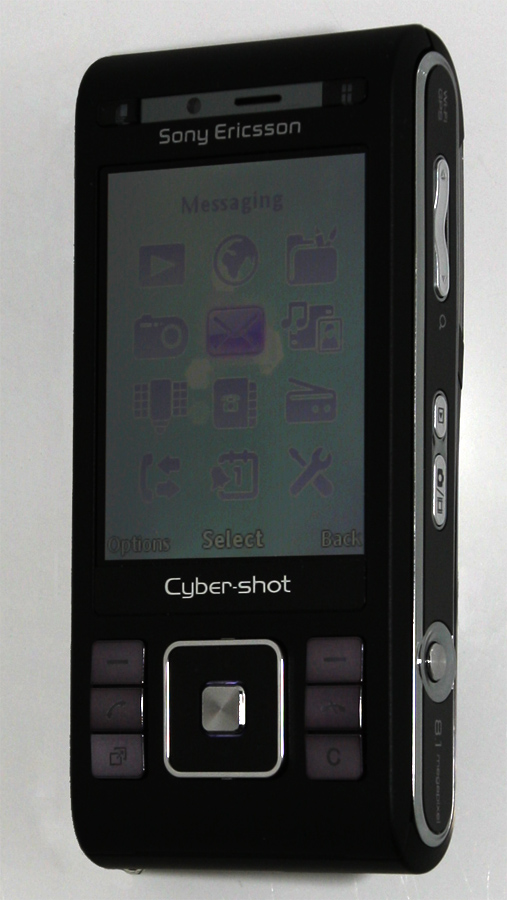
Sony Ericsson C905 cyber-shot mobile phone

Cyber-shot is Sony's line of point-and-shoot digital cameras introduced in 1996. Cyber-shot model names use a DSC prefix, which is an initialism for "Digital Still Camera". Many Cyber-shot models feature Carl Zeiss trademarked lenses, while others use Sony, or Sony G lenses.

All Cyber-shot cameras accept Sony's proprietary Memory Stick or Memory Stick PRO Duo flash memory, except the DSC-MD1 which only accepts MiniDisc. Select models have also supported CompactFlash. Current Cyber-shot cameras support Memory Stick PRO Duo, SD, SDHC, and SDXC. From 2006 to 2009, Sony Ericsson used the Cyber-shot brand in a line of mobile phones.

== Models ==
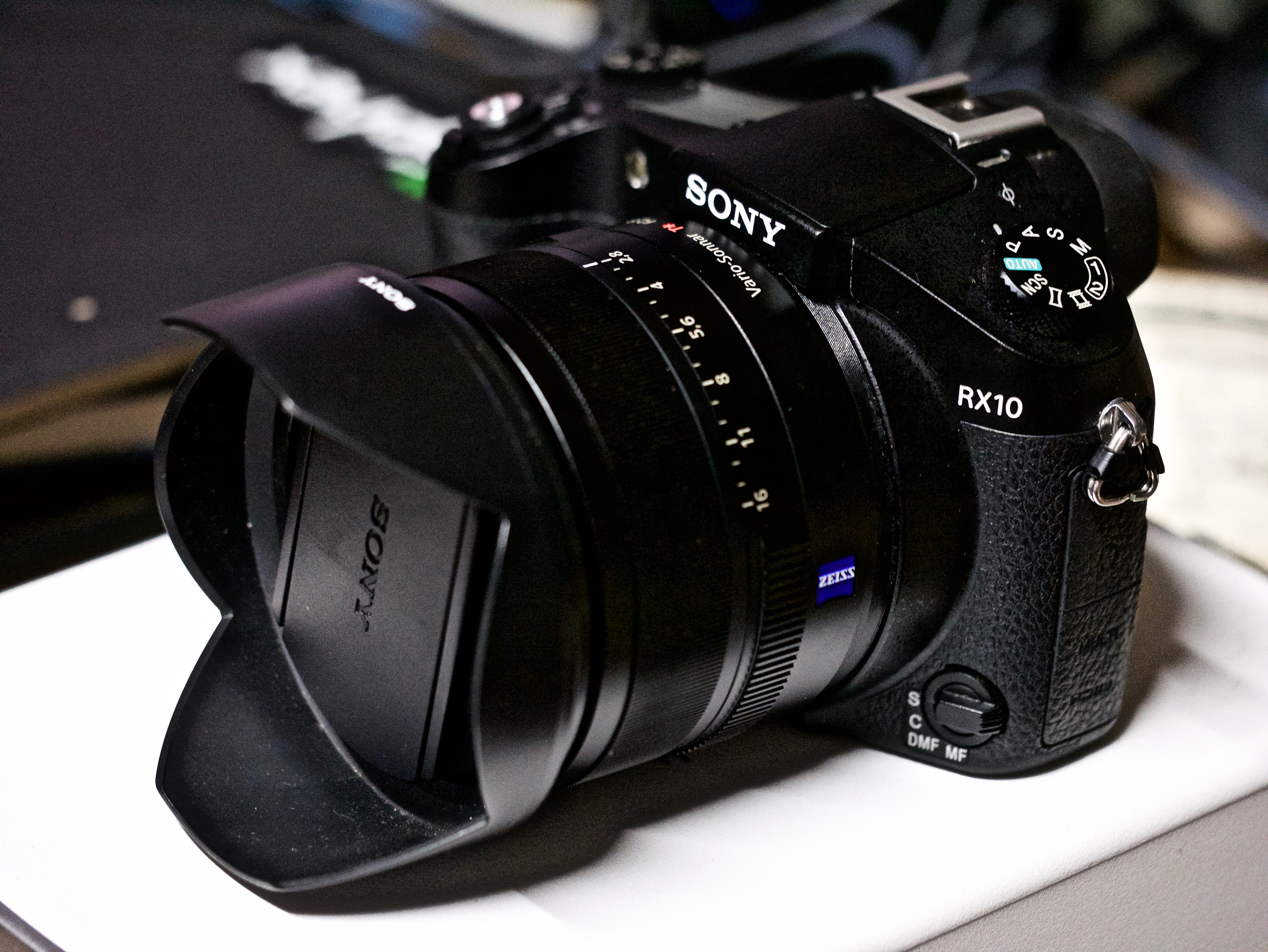
Sony Cyber-shot DSC-RX10 is a bridge camera that sports a 1 inch sensor and a Carl Zeiss lens.

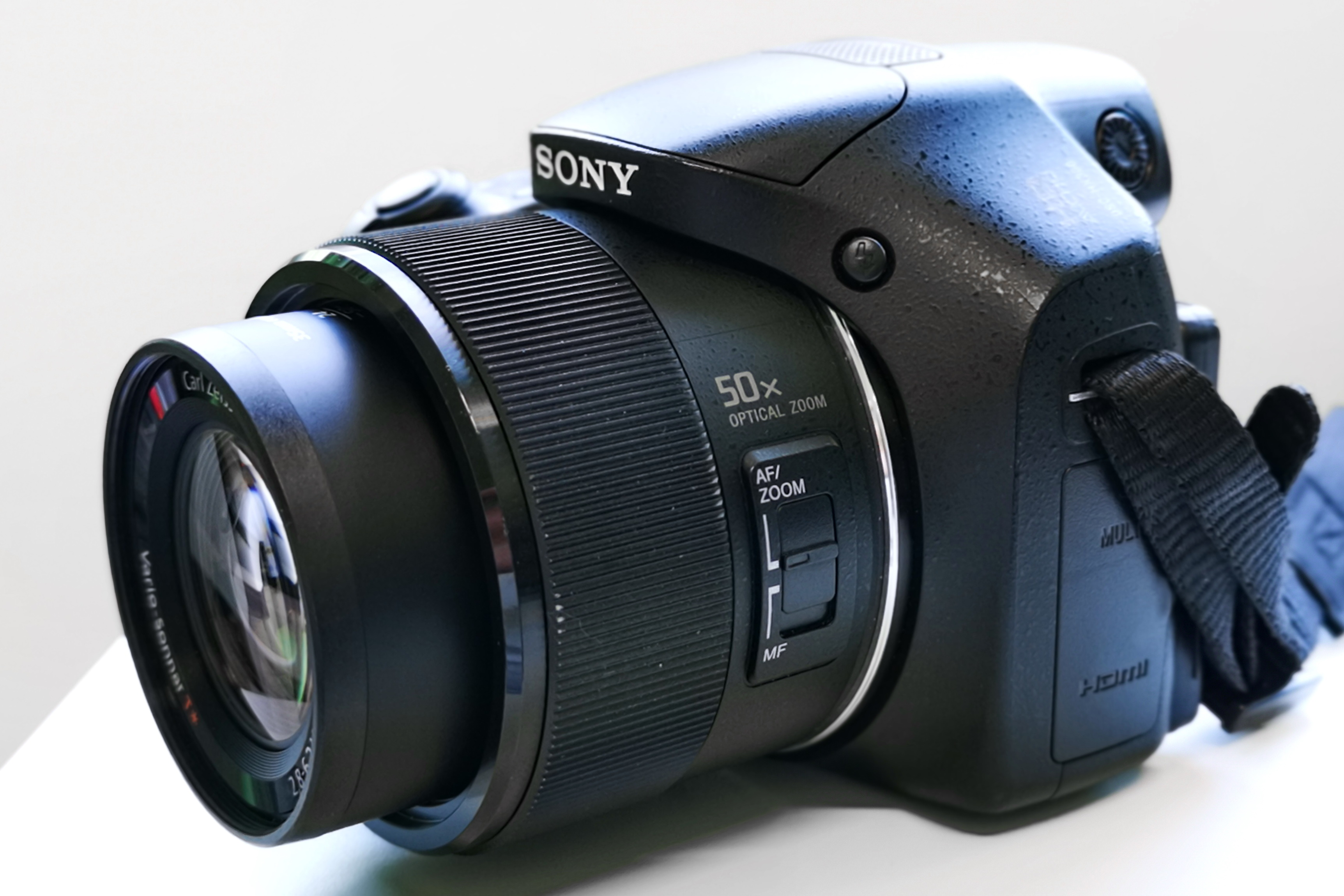
Sony Cyber-shot DSC-HX300

The current lineup consists of:

- R and RX series – large-sensor compact cameras
  - DSC-RX100/DSC-RX100 II/III/IV/V/VI/VII – pocketable camera with the largest 1" sensor of all cameras of its size
  - DSC-RX10/DSC-RX10 II — zoom lens 1" 24-200mm equivalent 35 mm bridge camera with constant widest aperture F2.8
  - DSC-RX10 III/DSC-RX10 IV — zoom lens 1" 24-600mm equivalent 35 mm bridge camera with widest aperture F2.4-F4
  - DSC-RX1/DSC-RX1R/DSC-RX1R II – the world's smallest full-frame camera
- H series and HX series - bridge cameras and compact cameras with long superzoom lenses
- W series – entry-level cameras
- WX series – entry level cameras with CMOS sensors.

Earlier lineup had the following models:

- QX series – lens-type compact cameras designed for use with smartphones
- T Series – rugged, slimline cameras with touchscreens
- F series - cameras with rotating lenses

=== Batteries ===
Currently, W cameras use N-type batteries while most HX, WX and RX cameras use Type X batteries, with some exceptions - smaller cameras like the WX220 using Type N, larger like the RX10 the W-type battery. Types N and X are interchangeable though Type X has twice the capacity of Type N.

In the past, the W and T-series use Sony N-type batteries while most H-series use G-type batteries.

== Features ==
=== 3D ===
Some Cyber-shot models can take 3D stills by shooting two images using two different focus settings. The technology uses one lens only for the process, and users can later see the images on a 3D TV or on a regular 2D screen. The cameras have been available since 2010.

=== Geotagging ===
Some Cyber-Shot models such as the DSC-HX20V, DSC-HX90V, DSC-HX200V and the DSC-HX400V have a built-in GPS so the user can have their photos automatically geotagged as they are being taken. The feature can also serve as a compass as it shows the user's position on the camera screen.

=== Tru Black ===
Tru Black is a technology developed by Sony which allows a better visualization of the screen, even when there is too much light. It enables LCD screens to automatically change the display contrast in order to enhance the controlling reflectance. In other words, when light hits a display with Tru Black technology, the screen turns opaque as a means to improve the visualization of the content.

=== Panorama ===
Sony introduced a panoramic photography mode branded as Sweep Panorama with the DSC-HX1 in 2009. The camera shoots continuously while it is swept across a scene and stitches the frames into a single image in-camera.

== See also ==
- Sony RX
- Sony Alpha
- Sony QX-series
- Sony Picture Motion Browser
- List of Sony Cyber-shot cameras
