= Sony Cyber-shot DSC-HX20V =

2012 compact camera

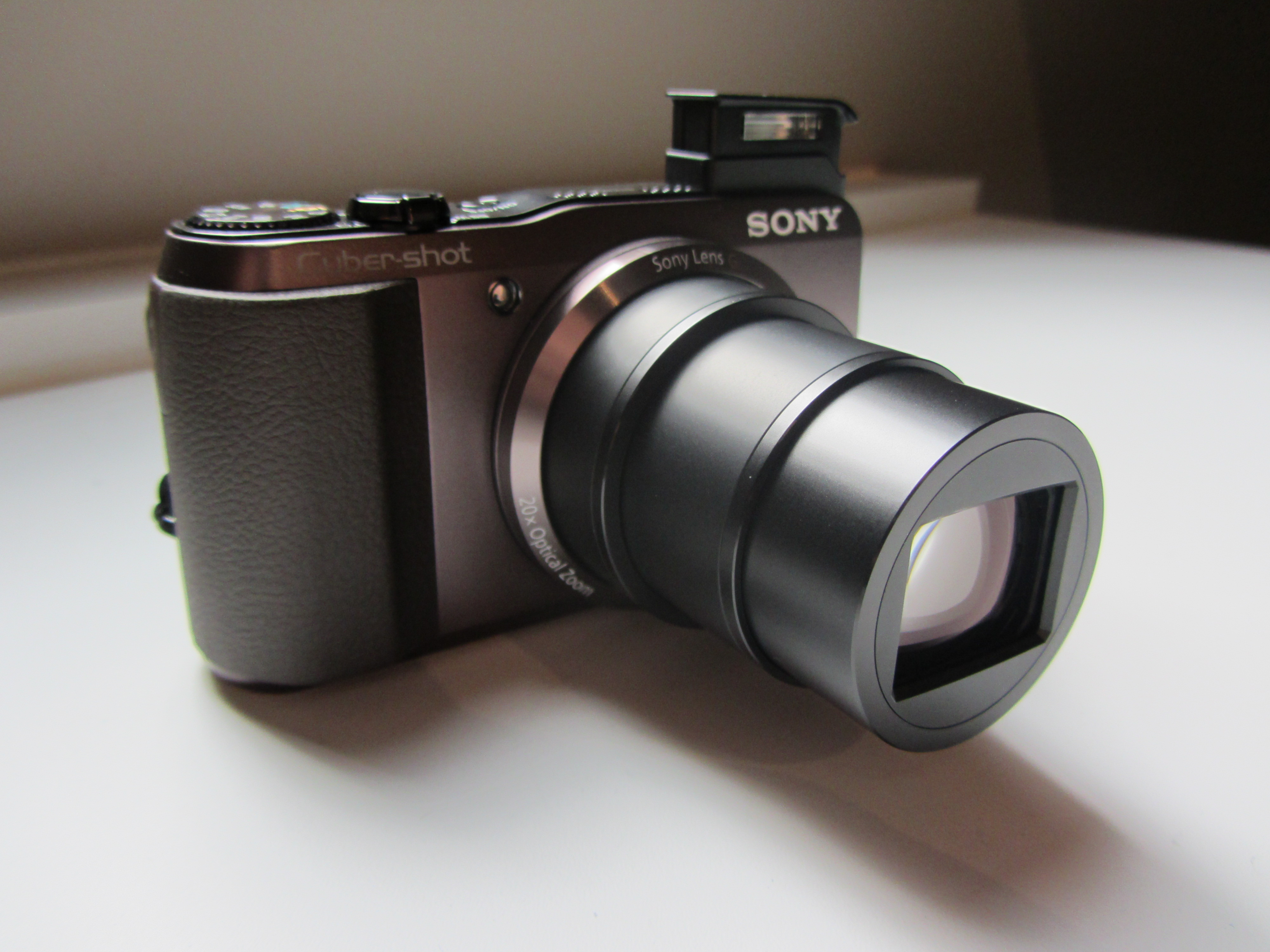

Overview
- Maker: Sony Group
- Type: Digital still camera + Superzoom camera

Lens
- Lens: SONY G 25-500mm (20x optical zoom) F3.5 (W) - 5.8 (T) / 40x (with zoom software)

Sensor/medium
- Sensor: 1/2.3" Exmor R™ CMOS Sensor
- Maximum resolution: 4,896 X 3,672 (18.9 megapixels)
- Film speed: ISO 100 - 12800
- Storage media: SD, SDHC, SDXCMultiMediaCard, internal

Focusing
- Focus modes: Multi Point AF / Center Weighted AF / Flexible Spot AF / Manual / Semi Manual / Tracking Focus / Face Tracking Focus
- Focus areas: (35mm equivalent) : Still 16:9: 27.5-550mm / Still 4:3: 25-500mm / Movie 16:9: 27.5-550mm(SteadyShot Standard), 28-784mm(SteadyShot Active) / Movie 4:3: 34-680mm(SteadyShot Standard), 35-980mm(SteadyShot Active)
- Focus bracketing: ±2.0 EV in ⅓ EV steps

Exposure/metering
- Exposure modes: Manual, Program, iAutomatic, Shutter Priority, Aperture Priority, Scene Mode(s) : High Sensitivity / Soft snap / Soft Skin / Landscape / Night Portrait / Night Scene / Handheld Twilight / Gourmet / Beach / Snow / Fireworks /Pet mode /Anti-motion blur / Backlight Correction HDR / Advanced sports shooting
- Exposure metering: Multi; Center; Spot
- Metering modes: Intelligent Multiple / Center Weighted / Spot

Flash
- Flash: ISO Auto: Approx.0.4m to 7.1m(1 feet 3 3/4 inches to 23 feet 3 5/8 inches)(W) / Approx.1.7m to 3.9 m(5feet 7 inches to 12 feet 9 5/8 inches)(T), ISO3200: up to Approx.10.0 m(32 feet 9 3/4 inches)(W) / Approx.5.5 m(18 feet 5/8 inches)(T)
- Flash bracketing: ±2.0 EV in ⅓ EV steps

Shutter
- Shutter: Burst Mode : Approx 10 fps at 18.2MP (Maximum 10 shots), Shutter Speeds : iAuto(4" - 1/1600) / Program Auto(1" - 1/1600) / Manual(30" - 1/1600), Self-timer : Off / 10sec. / 2sec. / portrait1 / portrait2, Shutter Response 0.1 seconds Wide - Focus / Shutter Response 0.15 seconds Full zoom - Focus / Shutter Response 0.3 seconds Switch on Time to Taking a Photo 1.8 seconds Shot to Shot (without flash) 1.25 seconds Shot to Shot with Flash 3.6 seconds; Continuous shooting High 6.4 fps; Continuous shooting Low 2 fps
- Shutter speed range: 0,15 sec - 3,6 sec
- Continuous shooting: 10 frames per sec.

Viewfinder
- Viewfinder: 3.0 inch 921K dot LCD screen

Image processing
- White balance: Auto, Manual, Outdoors/Daylight, Cloudy, Incandescent, Fluorescent, FlashGroup, White Balance

General
- Battery: Lithium N NP-BG1 3.4 Wh (960 mAh), minimum: 3.3 Wh (910 mAh) (at the beginning 11 °C/ 51.8 °F) Power Requirements : AC 100–240 V, 50/60 Hz, 70 mA
- Weight: 9.0oz (254g) 4 1/4" x 2 1/2" x 1 3/8" (106.6 x 61.9 x 34.6 mm)

The camera Sony Cyber-shot DSC-HX20V is a digital camera that was first released in 2012. The Sony Cyber-shot HX20V is part of the Cyber-shot line of cameras released by Sony.

== Features ==
The Sony HX20V Features include:

- Wide-angle lens
- 18.2 megapixel resolution
- Optical image stabilizer in the lens, reducing blurring by compensating for hand shake
- 10 fps continuous shooting
- 20x optical zoom range
- 1 cm minimum focusing distance
- Full HD 1080p movie mode in both normal and wide aspect ratio
- Panorama Still Image Size : Sweep Panorama:HR(10,480 x 4,096) / Wide(7,152 x 1,080/4,912 x 1,920) / Standard(4,912 x 1,080/3,424 x 1,920)
- Optical SteadyShot™ with 3-way Active Mode Image Stabilization
- Background Defocus
- Sony G Lens
- AVCHD 60i:28M PS(1,920×1,080/60p)/24M FX/17M FH(1,920×1,080/60i)/9M HQ(1,440×1,080/60i),MP4:12M(1,440×1,080/30fps)/6M(1,280×720/30fps)/3M VGA(640×480/30fps)
- Dust + push- sensitive objective (for comfortable use)
- GPS capabilities
- 40x digital zoom (clear image zoom)
- Manual modes

== Camera modes ==
- Intelligent Auto: allows the camera to analyze the scene and automatically adjust settings for optimal exposure, focus, and other parameters
- Program Auto (P): more control over settings like ISO, white balance, and exposure (camera handles other settings)
- Aperture priority (A): manually set the aperture while the camera adjusts other settings like shutter speed
- Shutter Priority (S): manually set the shutter speed while the camera adjusts other settings accordingly
- Manual Exposure (M): Provides full manual control over both aperture and shutter speed
- Scene Selection: Offers various scene modes optimized for specific shooting situations like Portrait, Landscape, Sports, Night Scene, etc.
- Sweep Panorama: Capture wide panoramic shots by panning the camera across a scene.
- Superior Auto: Similar to Intelligent Auto, but handles low-light exposure better, reducing noise.
- 3D Shooting Mode: Allows the capture of 3D images when used with a compatible display
- Background Defocus: simulates a shallow depth of field to create a blurred background

== Design ==
The Sony HX20/HX20V is designed to be a compact camera, that can fit very easily in your pocket. It includes a very small 960mah battery that can be easily changed on the go.

It features a grip object in between the camera controls for comfortable use with one hand. It's also constructed with durable materials to withstand everyday usage and occasional bumps or knocks during travel. A zoom -controlling mechanism is being used around the shutter button for quick zooming capabilities.

The GUI of the Sony HX20V was designed to be beginner-friendly.

At the bottom of the device, you can easily access the Memory card slot and Battery compartment. The Sony HX20V supports both Sony's branded Memory stick and SD card. The camera also comes with built-in flash memory (111 megabytes), in case of an emergency. Next to the battery/memory compartment is the Tripod screw holder, for easy use with a tripod! External accessories like a microphone are also supported by the Sony HX20V.

== Photo gallery ==
=== Camera ===
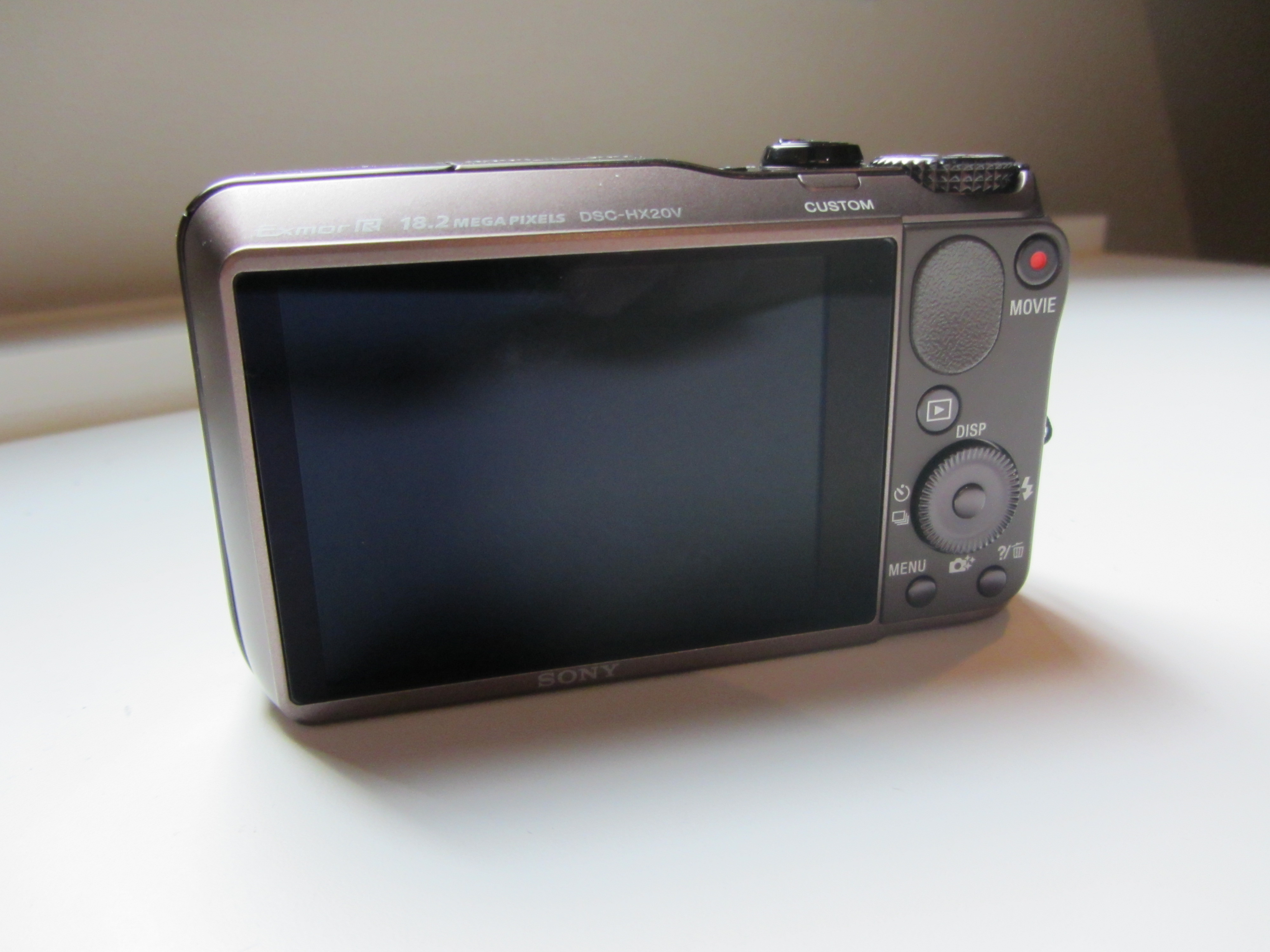

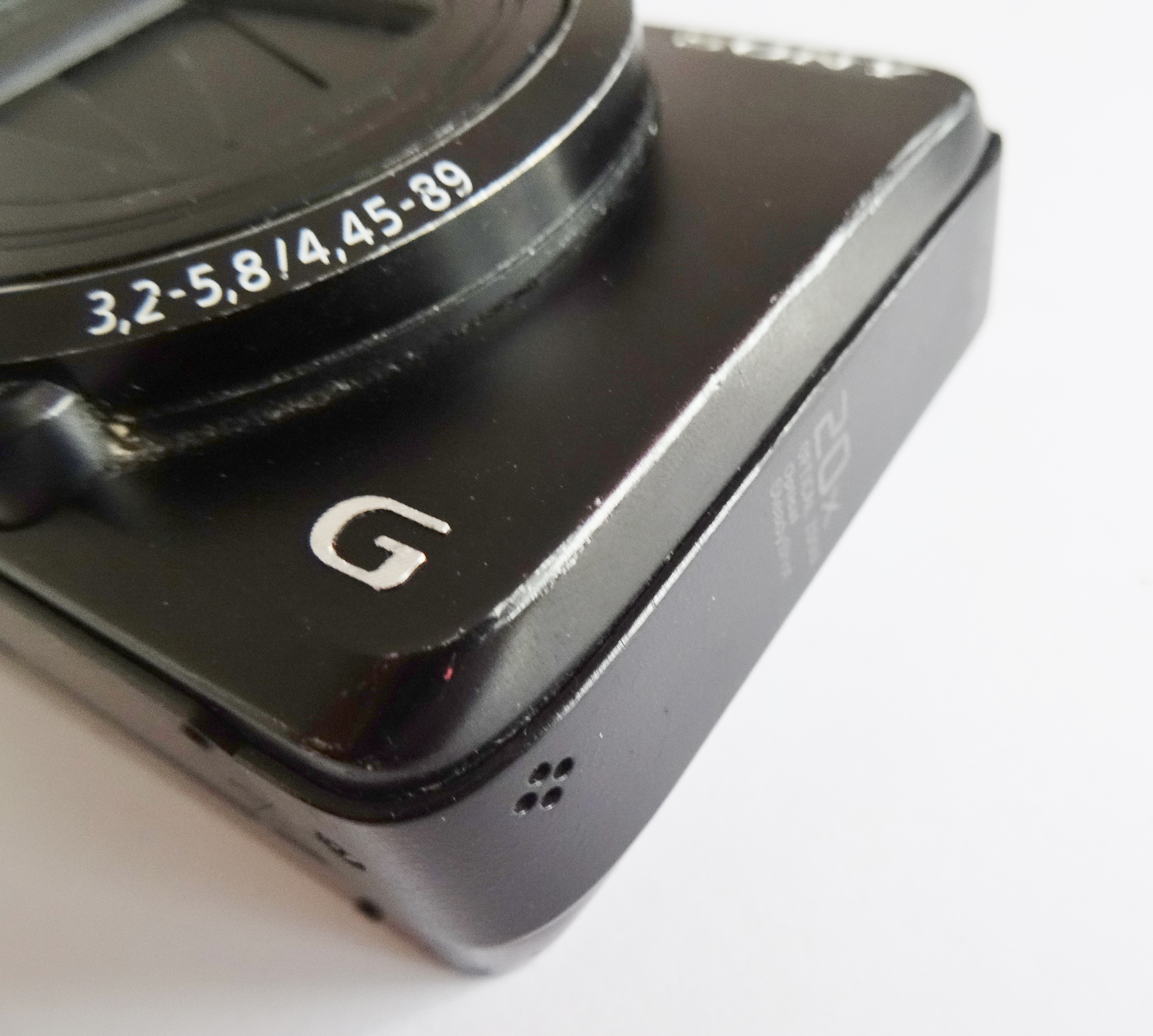

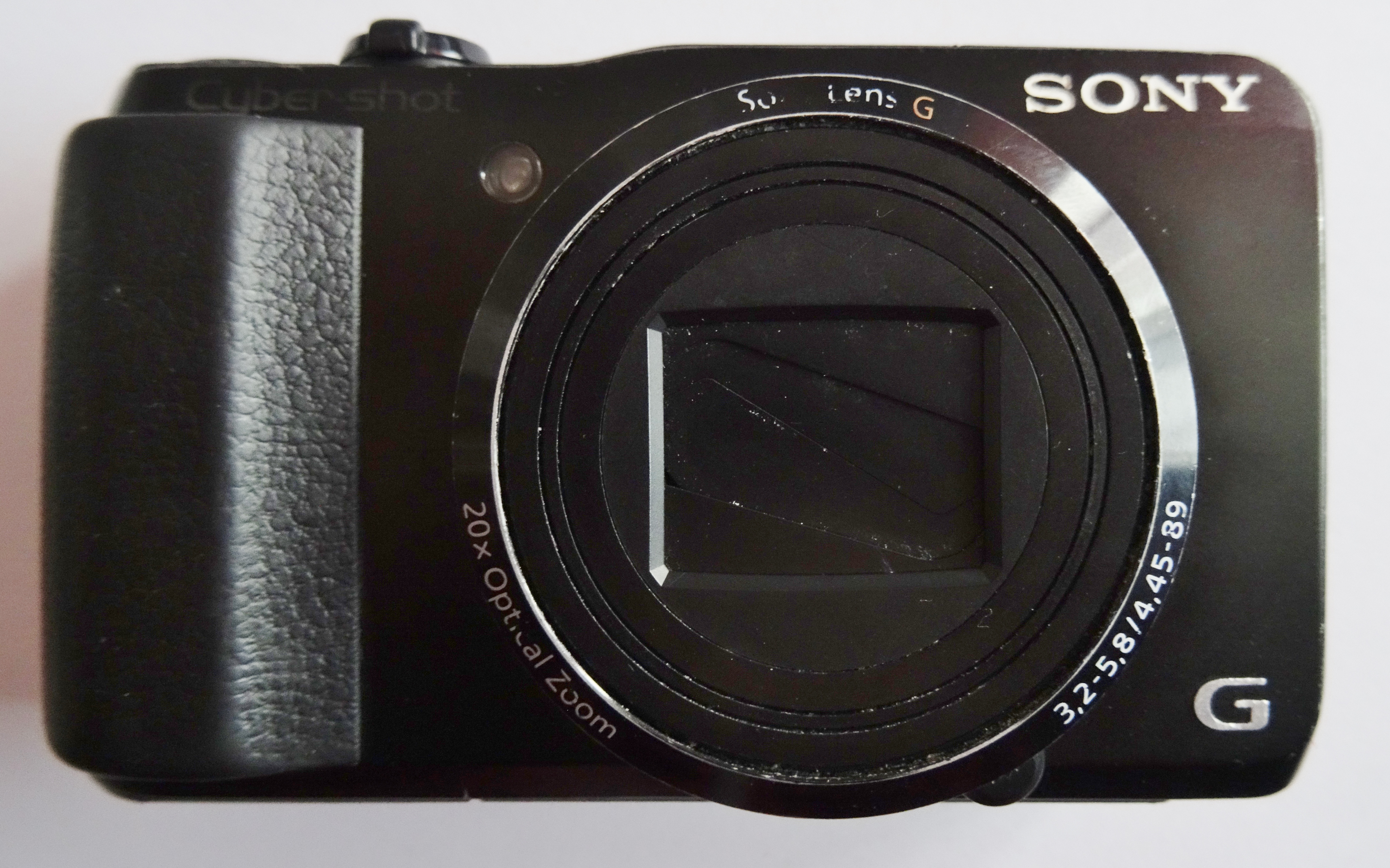

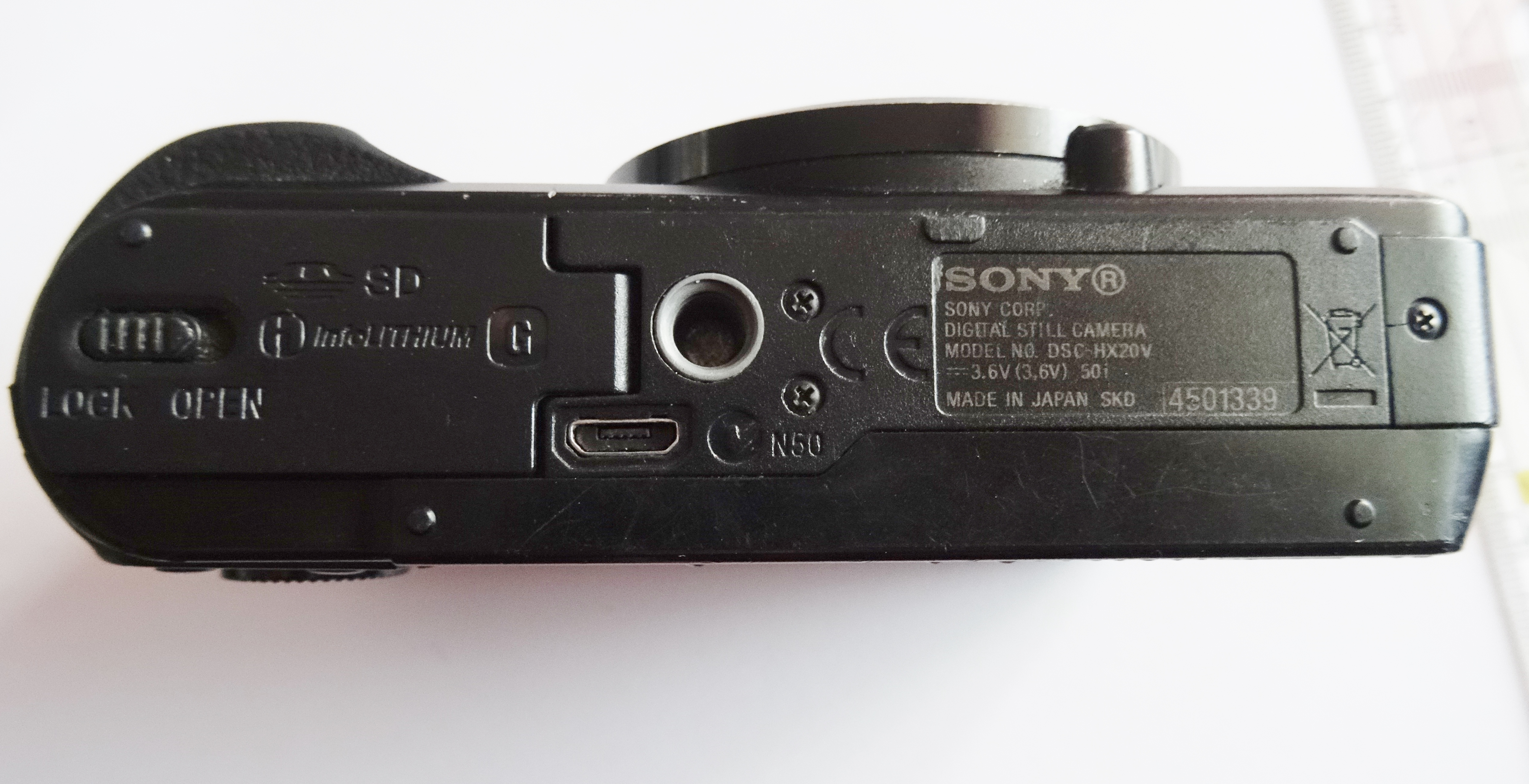

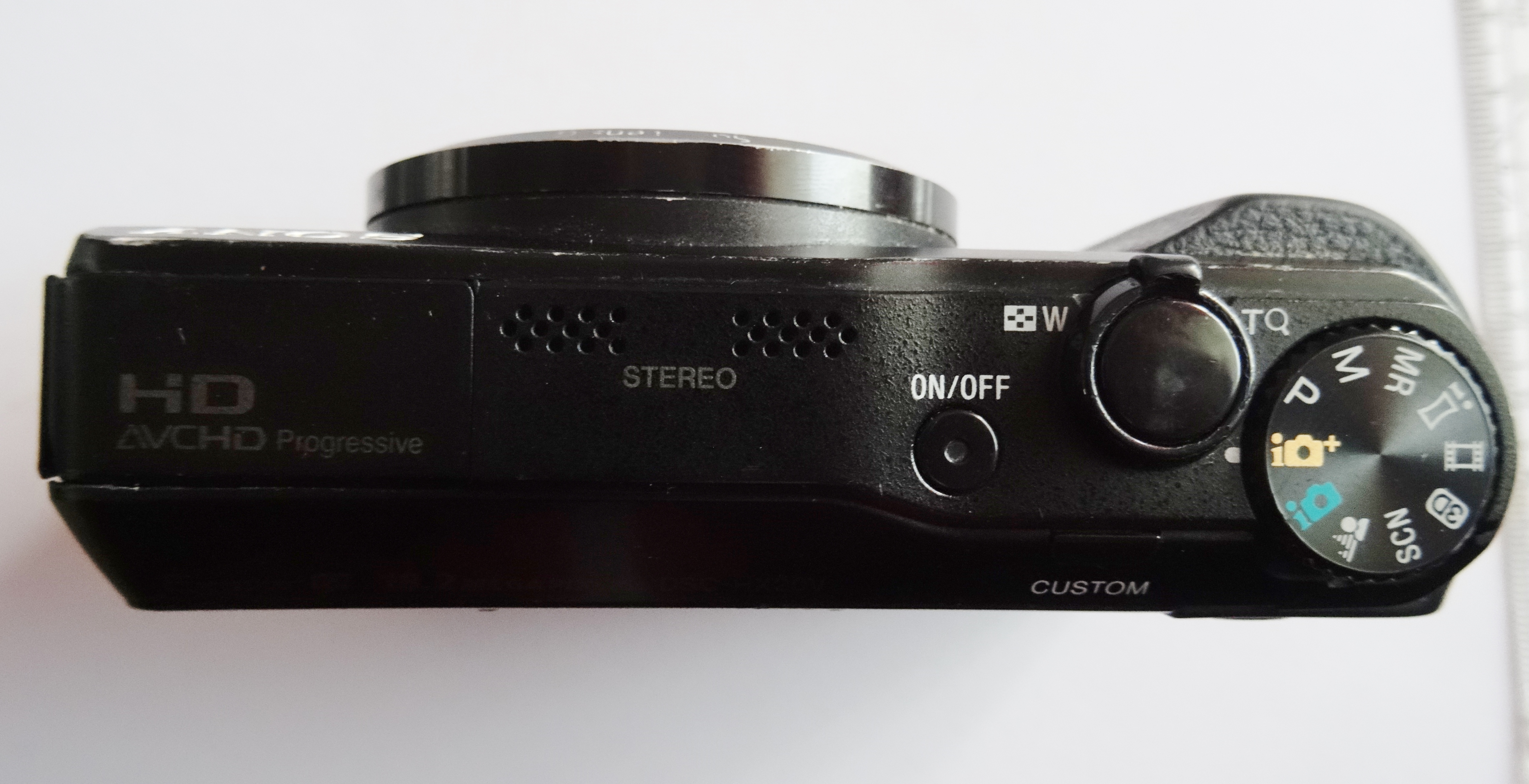

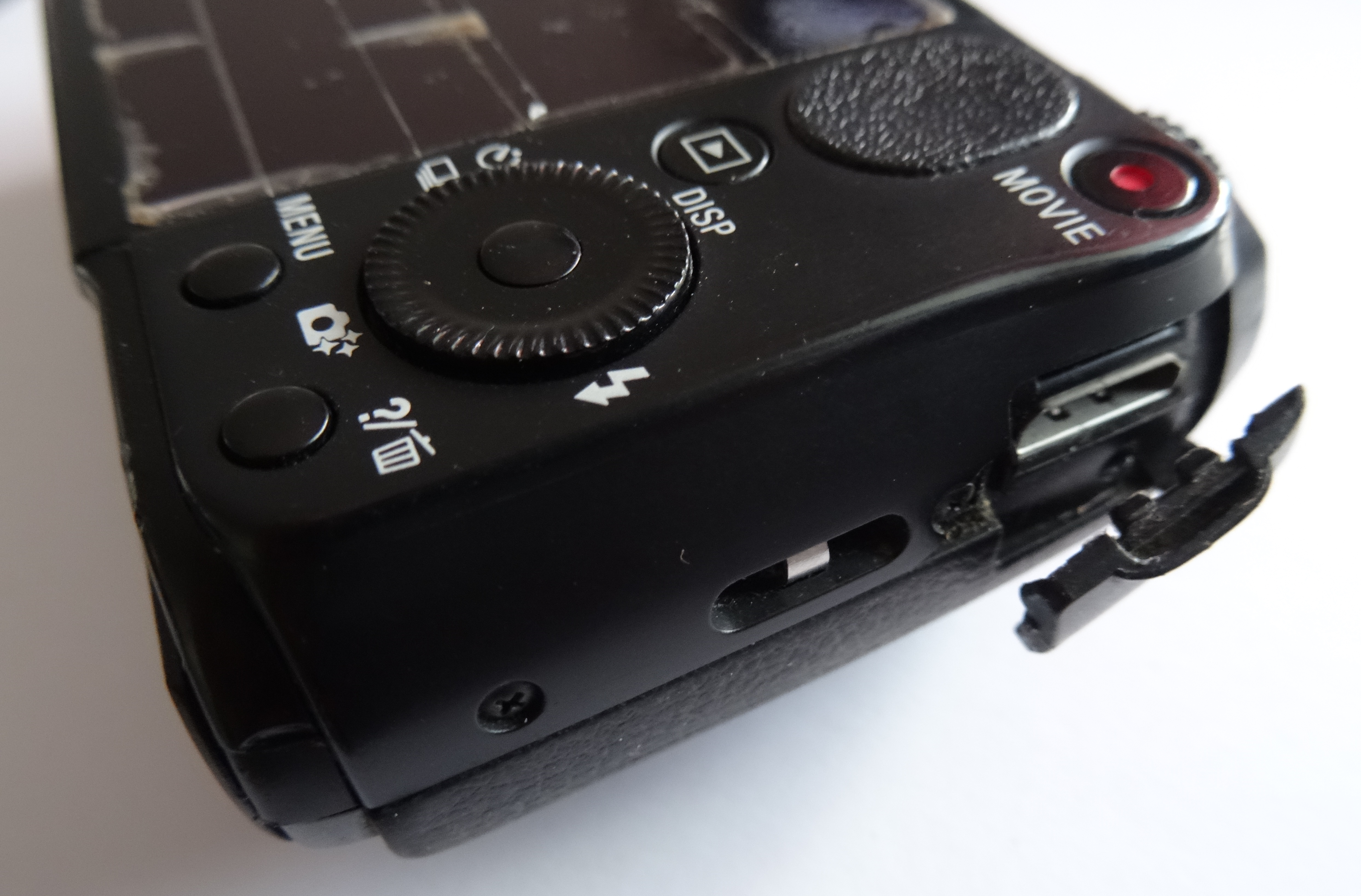

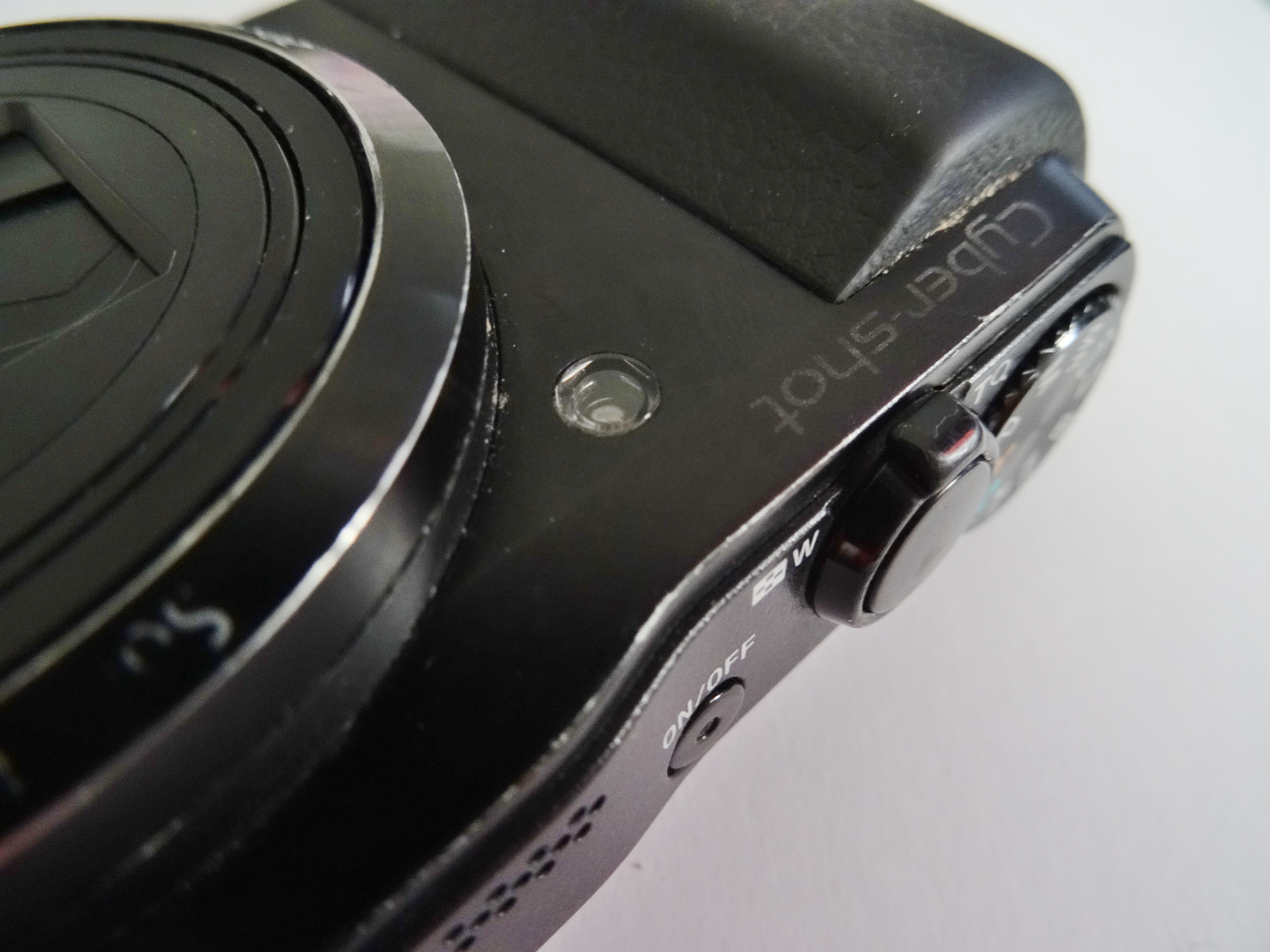

== See also ==
- Sony Cyber-shot DSC-HX200V
