= Picture Motion Browser =

- Screenshot of PMB 5.8.02.10270
- Original author(s): Sony
- Developer(s): Sony
- Stable release: Microsoft Windows / Version 5. 8.02.10270 November 8, 2011
- Operating system: Microsoft Windows
- Type: Digital photo organizer
- License: Proprietary software
- Website: http://support.d-imaging.sony.co.jp/www/disoft/int/pmb/index.html

Picture Motion Browser (PMB) is a software application from Sony for organizing and editing digital photos. In 2012, PMB was succeeded by Sony's PlayMemories Home.

== Photo Features ==
=== Organization and editing ===
For organizing photos, PMB has file importing and tracking features, as well as tags, facial recognition, and collections for further sorting. It also offers several basic photo editing functions, including color enhancement, red eye reduction and cropping. Other features include slide shows, printing and image timelines. Images can also be prepared for external use, such as for e-mailing or printing, by reducing file size and setting up page layouts. There is also integration with various online photo printing services.

==== Searching ====
PMB has a search bar that is always visible when viewing the library. Searches are live in that displayed items are filtered as you type. The search bar will search filenames, captions, tags, folder names, and other metadata.

=== Viewing ===
As of the newest version of PMB, the viewing window is integrated with the main program window. Fullscreen view is available in slideshow mode.

=== Backup ===
PMB is able to back up files to either a CD or DVD. Backups can also be made to Blu-ray disc if the appropriate software is installed. Pictures can also be exported to a memory stick or certain Sony Cyber-shot digital cameras.

=== Face recognition ===
Facial recognition is also present in PMB, although not to the extent of Picasa. While faces are shown, you cannot group them by a certain person or add a name to them.

=== Geotagging ===
Pictures and video imported into PMB are able to be geotagged with Google Maps if they do not have GPS data already attached. If the picture has GPS Exif data attached, then PMB will display it.

== Video Features ==
PMB is capable of importing AVCHD video to the local computer. PMB can also allow minor editing, such as combining and trimming of video. A user can upload video to Facebook or YouTube or a user can burn 1080p60 video to Blu-ray or DVD after converting to 1080i. On the latest version-5.8.02-it adds the capability to burn 3D and 60p/50p videos on Blu-ray Disc media without being converted (September 2011).

== See also ==
- Comparison of image viewers
- Desktop organizer
