= Nikon D7200 =

Digital single-lens reflex camera

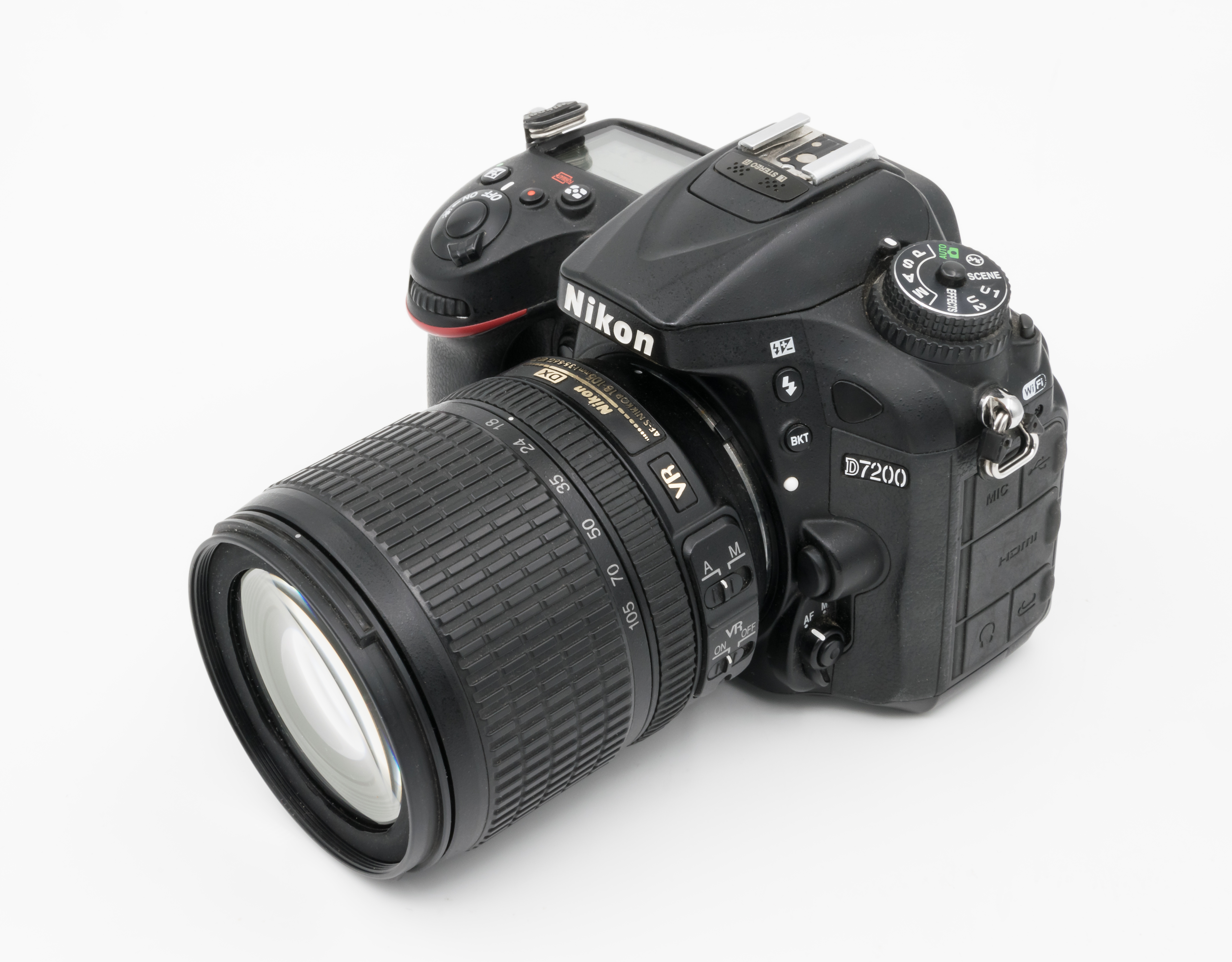

Overview
- Maker: Nikon
- Type: Digital single-lens reflex camera

Lens
- Lens mount: Nikon F

Sensor/medium
- Sensor type: CMOS
- Sensor size: 23.5 x 15.6mm (APS-C type), 3.9 µm pixel size
- Maximum resolution: 6000 x 4000 (24 megapixels)
- Film speed: 100 – 25,600, with ISO 51,200 and 102,400 black and white modes
- Recording medium: SD/SDHC/SDXC (two slots)

Focusing
- Focus areas: 51 focus points

Shutter
- Shutter speeds: 1/8000s to 30s
- Continuous shooting: 6 frame/s or 7 frame/s in 1.3x crop mode

Viewfinder
- Viewfinder magnification: 0.94
- Frame coverage: 100%

Image processing
- Image processor: Expeed 4
- White balance: Yes

General
- LCD screen: 3.2 inches with 1,228,800 dots
- Battery: EN-EL15
- Dimensions: 136 x 107 x 76 mm (5.35 x 4.21 x 2.99 inches)
- Weight: 765 g including battery, 675 g body only
- Latest firmware: 1.04 / 7 June 2018; 8 years ago
- Made in: Thailand

Chronology
- Predecessor: Nikon D7100
- Successor: Nikon D7500

The Nikon D7200 is a 24-megapixel APS-C digital single-lens reflex camera announced by Nikon on March 2, 2015. It started shipping on March 19. The D7200 was superseded by the Nikon D7500, announced on April 12, 2017.

== Features ==
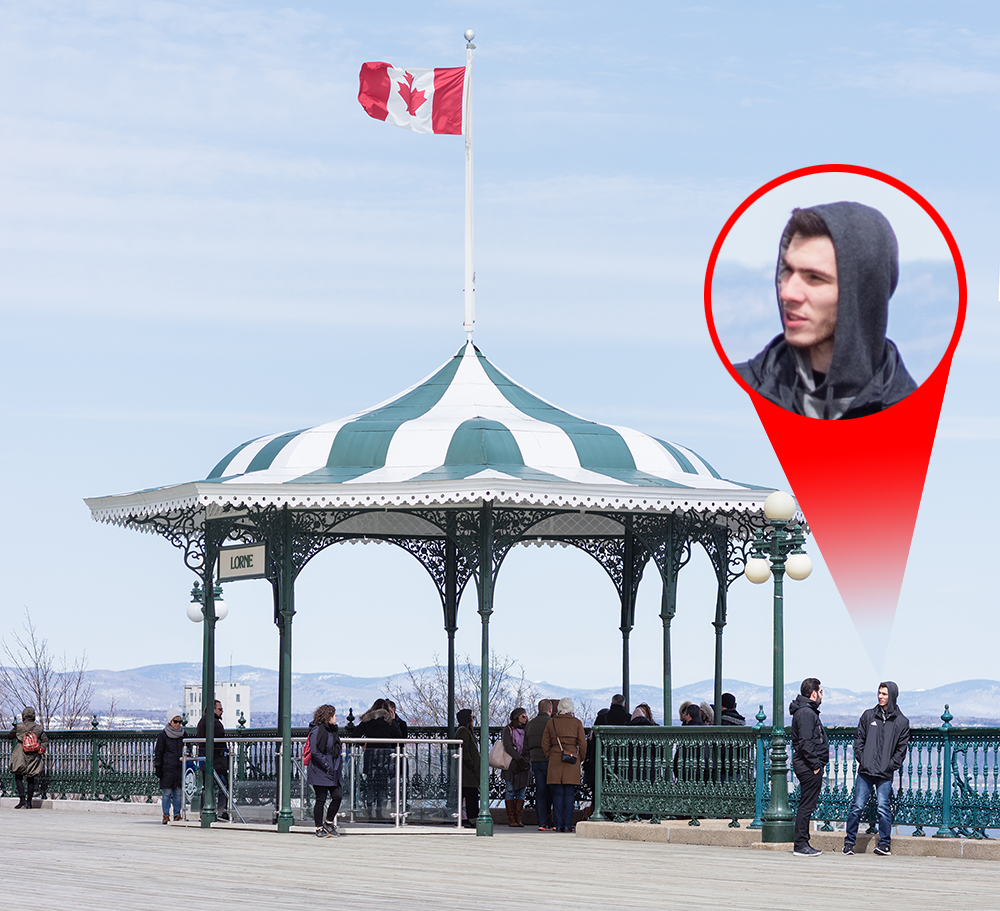
Image zoom 1:1 quality test

The D7200 is equipped with features intended for semi-professional use (two SD card slots, the availability of a battery grip, and metering support for old manual focus Nikon AI type (Non-CPU) lenses), which have been removed from the D7500. Being the successor of the Nikon D7100 it has (among other things) the following enhancements:

- An improved buffer size that at its highest frame rate (6 frames per second) can store eighteen raw images (entire APS-C frame recorded, 14-bit lossless compressed), whereas the D7100 can store six images.
- The optical CMOS sensor has been exchanged to a different model, which (unlike the D7100's) is not prone to generating faint striped patterns (banding noise) in night photography with strongly amplified dark tones (a scenario typical for Astrophotography).
- Sensor-related image quality measures have been determined to lead the APS-C camera class (as of April 2015)
- All 51 autofocus (AF) sensors have an improved performance at very low light scenes, with the effect of its light sensitivity being one exposure value better (-3 EV) than the D7100 (-2 EV). -3 EV allows for autofocusing in outdoor scenes only lit by the full Moon, or equivalently dark artificial light or candle light scenes.
- The electronic processor has been updated, (EXPEED 4 replaced EXPEED 3).
- Power consumption has been lowered, so that a battery charge lasts for typical 1110 exposures, which is 160 more than the D7100 under the same conditions.
- Wi-Fi is now built-in, as is NFC, offering simpler smartphone connectivity.
- The layout of the shoulder display has been simplified. Its overall size is the same as before, but some secondary information has been removed in favor for tidiness and for important items to appear bigger.
- The back screen's visual interface has been changed slightly.
- A new picture processing mode (called "Flat Picture Control"), which does not change the original tone reproduction curve, has been adopted from higher-end models. This is to benefit RAW and JPEG photographers and videographers, who prefer to see histograms and preview images with high tone fidelity during shooting of scenes with a high dynamic range, and prefer to postpone any tonal adjustments for later post-processing.
- The maximum video quality mode (1080 lines/60 frames per second at a frame size reduced by the factor 1.3) has been improved to be non-interlaced (60p), where the D7100 was interlaced (60i).

Otherwise, it has also been described as "by no means a radical upgrade" compared to its predecessor, "yet it still adds some important features".

The camera body shape has been left unchanged, in particular the deeper-grip update of other latest models such as the D5500 hasn't been adopted for the D7200.

== Gallery ==
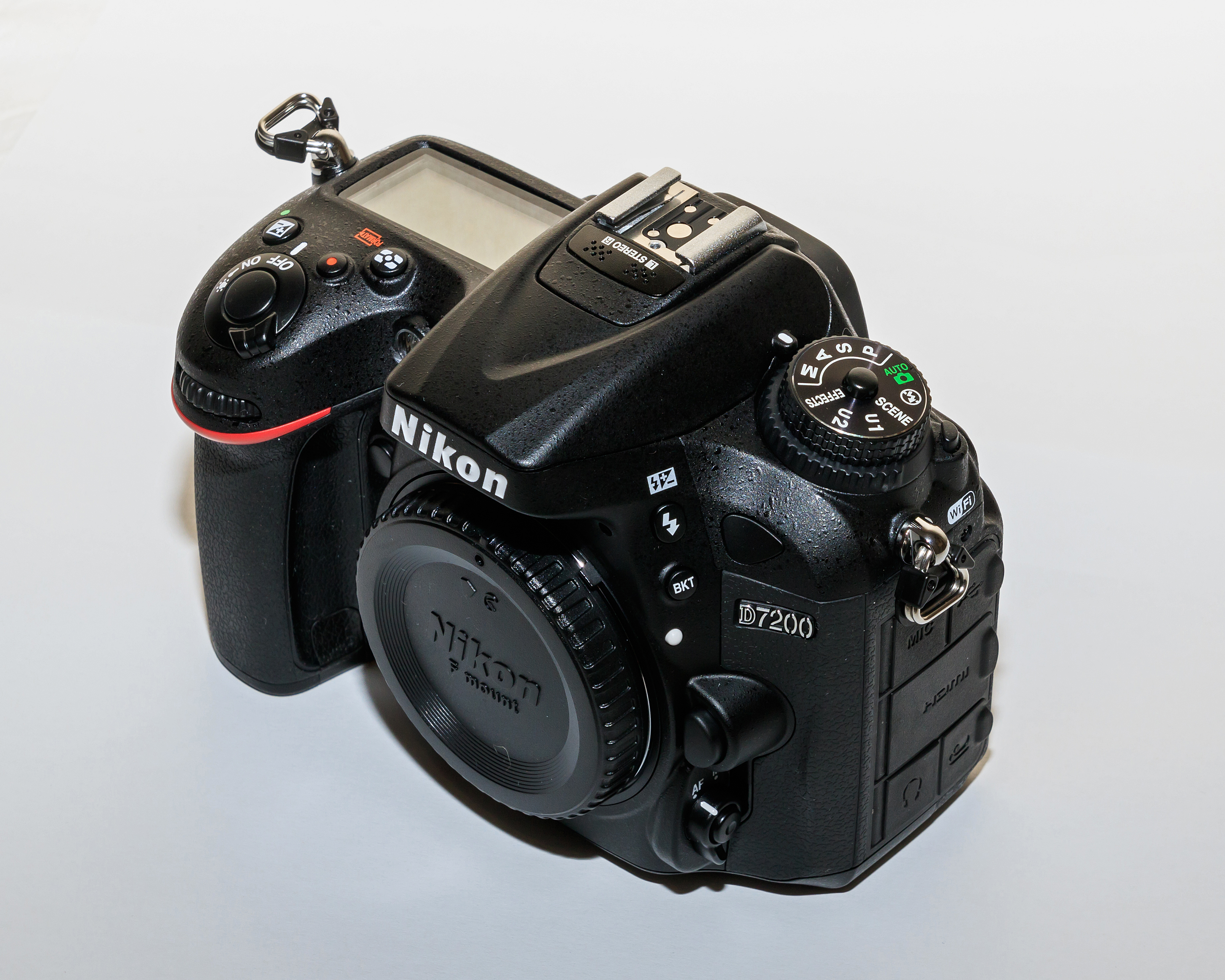
Front view, body only

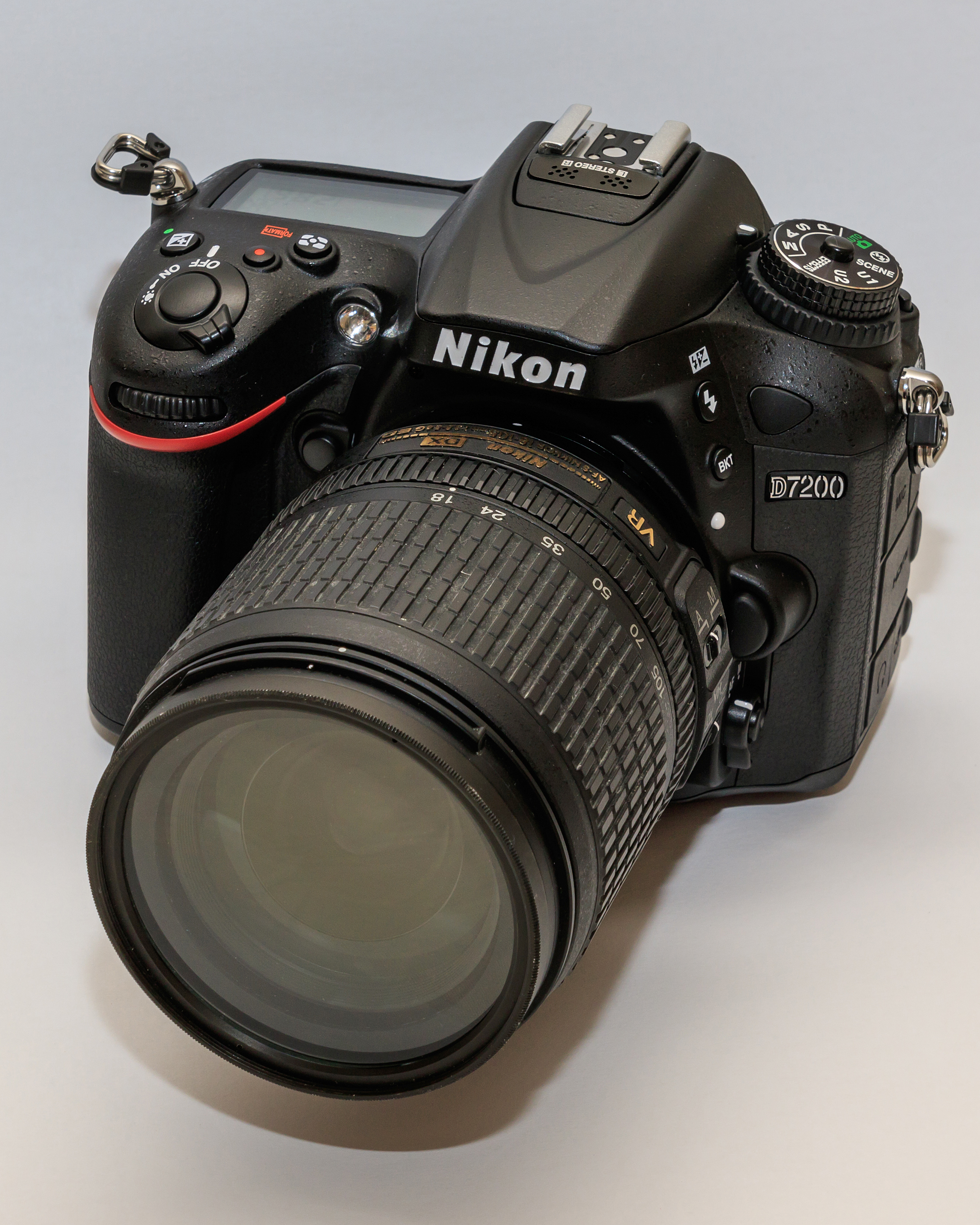
With AF-S DX Nikkor 18-105mm f/3.5-5.6G ED VR

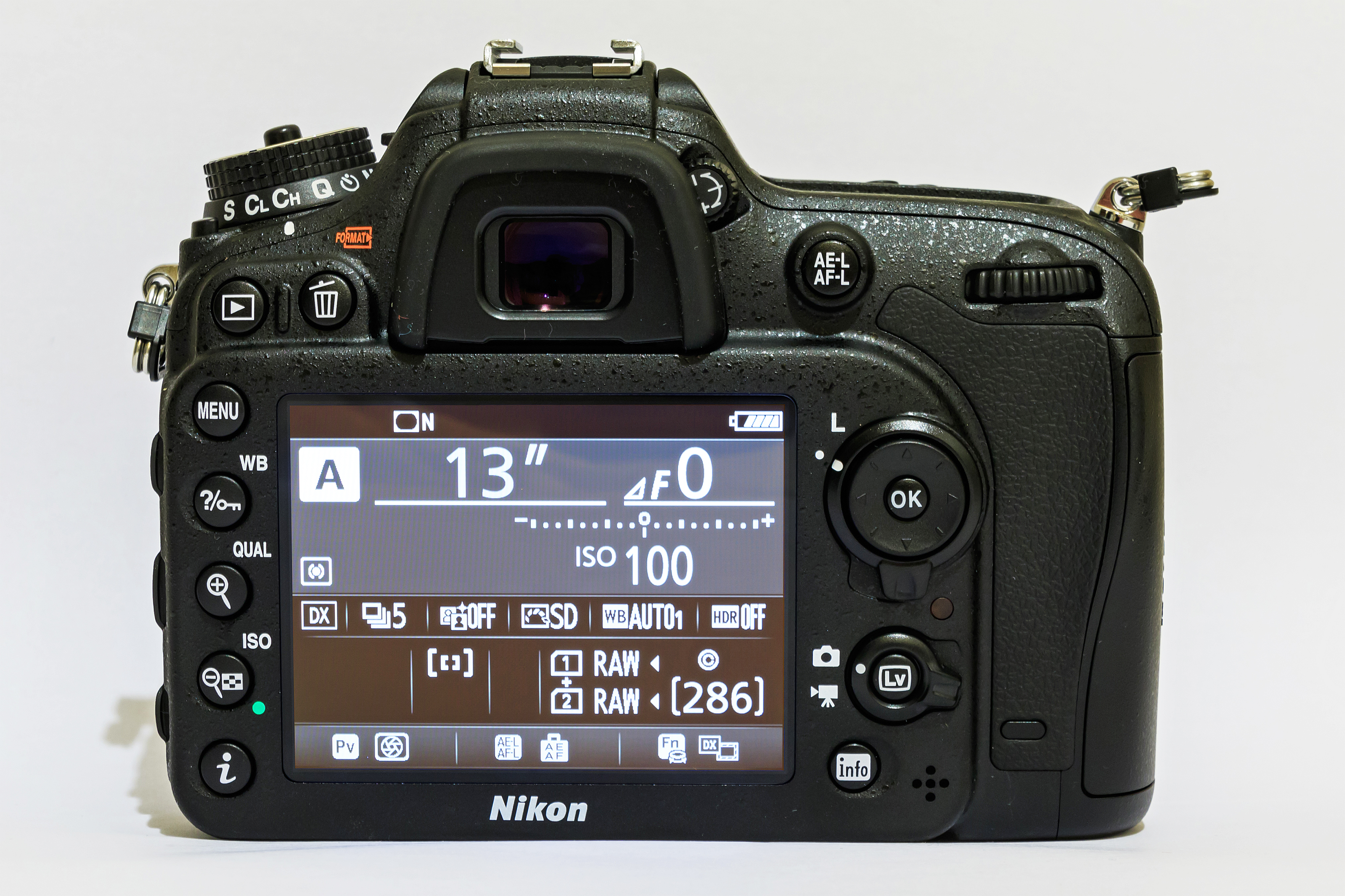
Rear view

Sensor	Class	'99	'00	'01	'02	'03	'04	'05	'06	'07	'08	'09	'10	'11	'12	'13	'14	'15	'16	'17	'18	'19	'20	'21	'22	'23	'24	'25	'26
FX (Full-frame)	Flagship											D3X ^{−P}																	
FX (Full-frame)	Flagship										D3 ^{−P}		D3S ^{−P}		D4		D4S		D5^{T}					D6^{T}					
FX (Full-frame)	Professional											D700 ^{−P}			D800/D800E			D810/D810A			D850 ^{AT}								
FX (Full-frame)	Enthusiast																Df												
FX (Full-frame)	Enthusiast																	D750 ^{A}					D780 ^{AT}						
FX (Full-frame)	Enthusiast															D600	D610												
DX (APS-C)	Flagship		D1^{−E}	D1X^{−E}				D2X^{−E}		D2Xs^{−E}																			
DX (APS-C)	Flagship		D1^{−E}	D1H ^{−E}			D2H^{−E}	D2Hs^{−E}																					
DX (APS-C)	Professional				D100^{−E}				D200^{−E}		D300^{−P}		D300S^{−P}						D500 ^{AT}										
DX (APS-C)	Enthusiast						D70^{−E}		D70s^{−E}	D80^{−E}		D90^{−E}		D7000 ^{−P}			D7100	D7200			D7500 ^{AT}								
DX (APS-C)	Upper-entry								D50^{−E}	D40X^{−E*}	D60^{−E*}		D5000^{A−P*}		D5100^{A−P*}	D5200^{A−P*}	D5300^{A*}	D5500^{AT*}		D5600 ^{AT*}									
DX (APS-C)	Entry-level									D40^{−E*}			D3000^{−E*}	D3100^{−P*}		D3200^{−P*}	D3300^{*}			D3400^{*}		D3500^{*}							
Early models		SVC (prototype; 1986); QV-1000C (1988); NASA F4 (1991); E2/E2S (1995); E2N/E2NS (1996); E3/E3S (1998)																											
Sensor	Class																												
Sensor	Class	'99	'00	'01	'02	'03	'04	'05	'06	'07	'08	'09	'10	'11	'12	'13	'14	'15	'16	'17	'18	'19	'20	'21	'22	'23	'24	'25	'26
