= Olympus Stylus Tough TG-860 =

Overview
- Maker: Olympus

Lens
- Lens: 21-105mm equivalent
- F-numbers: f/3.5-f/5.7 at the widest

Sensor/medium
- Sensor type: BSI-CMOS
- Sensor size: 6.17 x 4.55mm (1/2.3 inch type)
- Maximum resolution: 4608 x 3456 (16 megapixels)
- Recording medium: SD/SDHC/SDXC card, internal memory

Shutter
- Shutter speeds: 1/2000s to 4s
- Continuous shooting: 7 frames per second

Image processing
- Image processor: TruePic VII
- White balance: Yes

General
- LCD screen: 3 inches with 460,000 dots
- Body features: Water submersible
- Dimensions: 130 x 64 x 28mm (5.12 x 2.52 x 1.1 inches)
- Weight: 224 g (8 oz) including battery

The Olympus Stylus Tough TG-860 is a digital rugged compact camera announced by Olympus on February 5, 2015. It has built-in WiFi and GPS, and is waterproof to a depth of 15m (50 feet), freezeproof to -10 degrees Celsius (14 degrees Fahrenheit), crushproof to a force of 100 kg or 220 pounds. It's also shockproof against drops from up to 2.1m (7 feet) in height.
