= Sony Cyber-shot DSC-HX200V =

Sony Cyber-shot DCS-HX200V
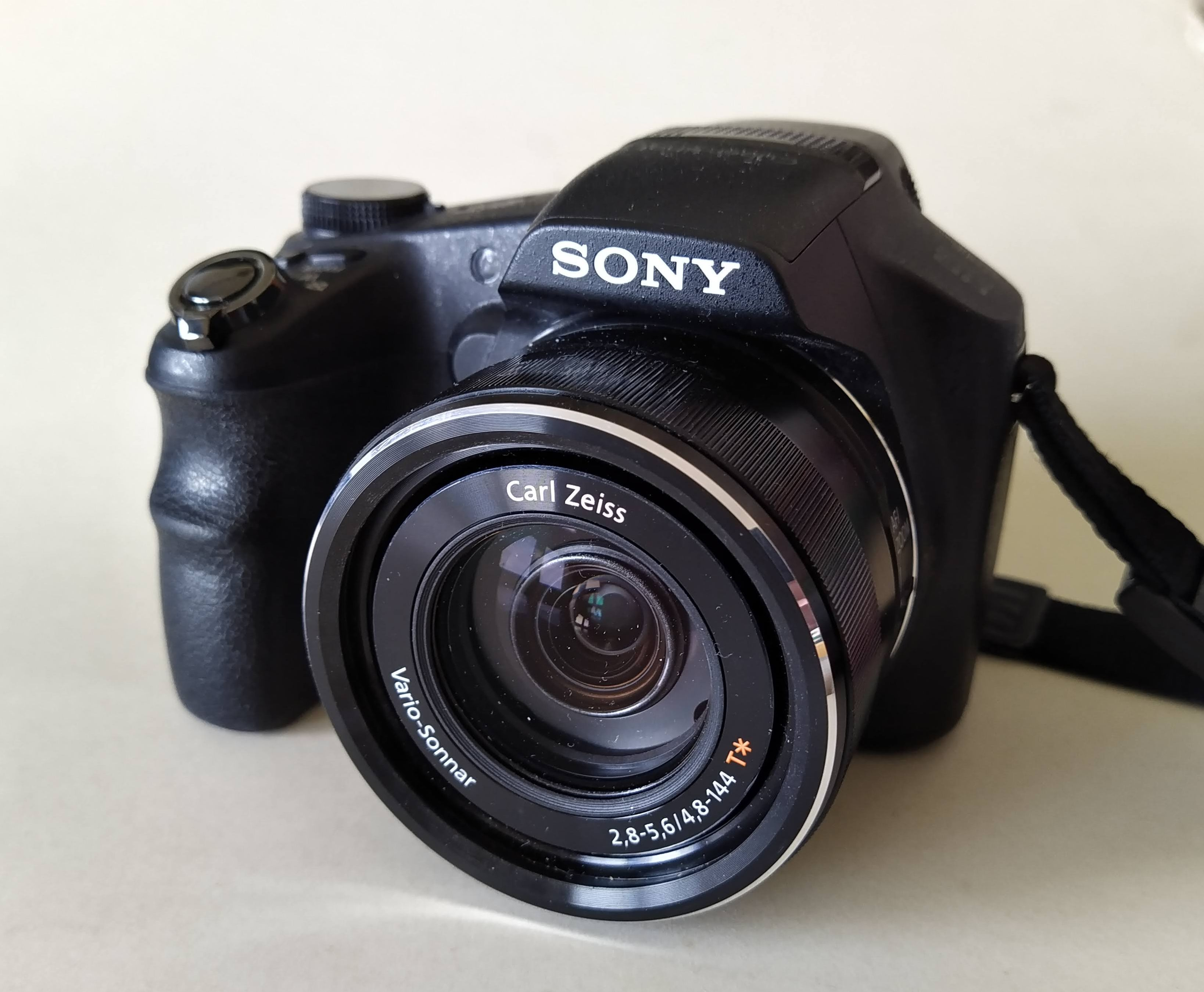

Overview
- Maker: Sony
- Type: Bridge digital camera
- Released: February 28, 2012

Lens
- Lens: fixed, non‑interchangeable Carl Zeiss Vario‑Sonnar T\* 27-810 mm (30x optical zoom) F2.8-F5.6 Optical SteadyShot stabilization

Sensor/medium
- Sensor: 1/2.3" CMOS
- Maximum resolution: 4896x3672 (18.2 megapixels)
- Film speed: ISO 100-12800
- Storage media: SD, SDHC, SDXCMultiMediaCard, internal

Focusing
- Focus modes: Automatic or Manual
- Focus areas: Multi-point AF Center AF Flexible Spot AF Tracking AF Face Detection Smile Shutter
- Focus bracketing: ±2.0 EV in ⅓ EV steps

Exposure/metering
- Exposure modes: Manual, Program, iAutomatic, Shutter Priority, Aperture Priority,
- Exposure metering: Multi; Center; Spot
- Metering modes: Intelligent Multiple / Center Weighted / Spot

Flash
- Flash: Built-in pop up; Range: 0.3 - 17.5meters(on ISO-12800)
- Flash bracketing: ±2.0 EV in ⅓ EV steps

Shutter
- Shutter: Electronic
- Shutter speed range: 30-1/4000 sec
- Continuous shooting: 10 frames per sec.

Image processing
- White balance: Auto, Lumineux, Nuageux, Fluorescent1, Fluorescent2, Fluorescent3, Incandescent, Flash, Button Setting, Button Setting Group, White Balance

General
- Battery: Lithium NP‑FH50 6.8 V, 900 mAh
- Weight: 15.6 oz (531 g)

Chronology
- Replaced: Sony Cyber-shot DCS-HX100V
- Replaced by: Sony Cyber-shot DCS-HX300

References
- https://www.sony.com/electronics/support/compact-cameras-dsc-h-series/dsc-hx200v/specifications

Sony Cyber-shot DSC-HX200V is a hyperzoom bridge digital camera announced by Sony on February 28, 2012. It features an 18.2‑megapixel Exmor R CMOS sensor and a Carl Zeiss Vario‑Sonnar T\* lens with a 30× optical zoom (27–810 mm equivalent) and f/2.8–5.6 aperture range. The camera includes Optical SteadyShot image stabilization, Intelligent ISO Control, and Clear Image Zoom (digital zoom enhancement).

The DSC‑HX200V offers multiple shooting modes, including full manual exposure control, and supports Full HD 1080/60p video recording. It uses Sony’s BIONZ image processor. The camera is equipped with a 3.0-inch tilting LCD and a color electronic viewfinder. It was available in black (K) and silver (S) finishes. The HX200V was succeeded by the Sony Cyber-shot DSC-HX300.
