= Sony Cyber-shot DSC-HX400V =

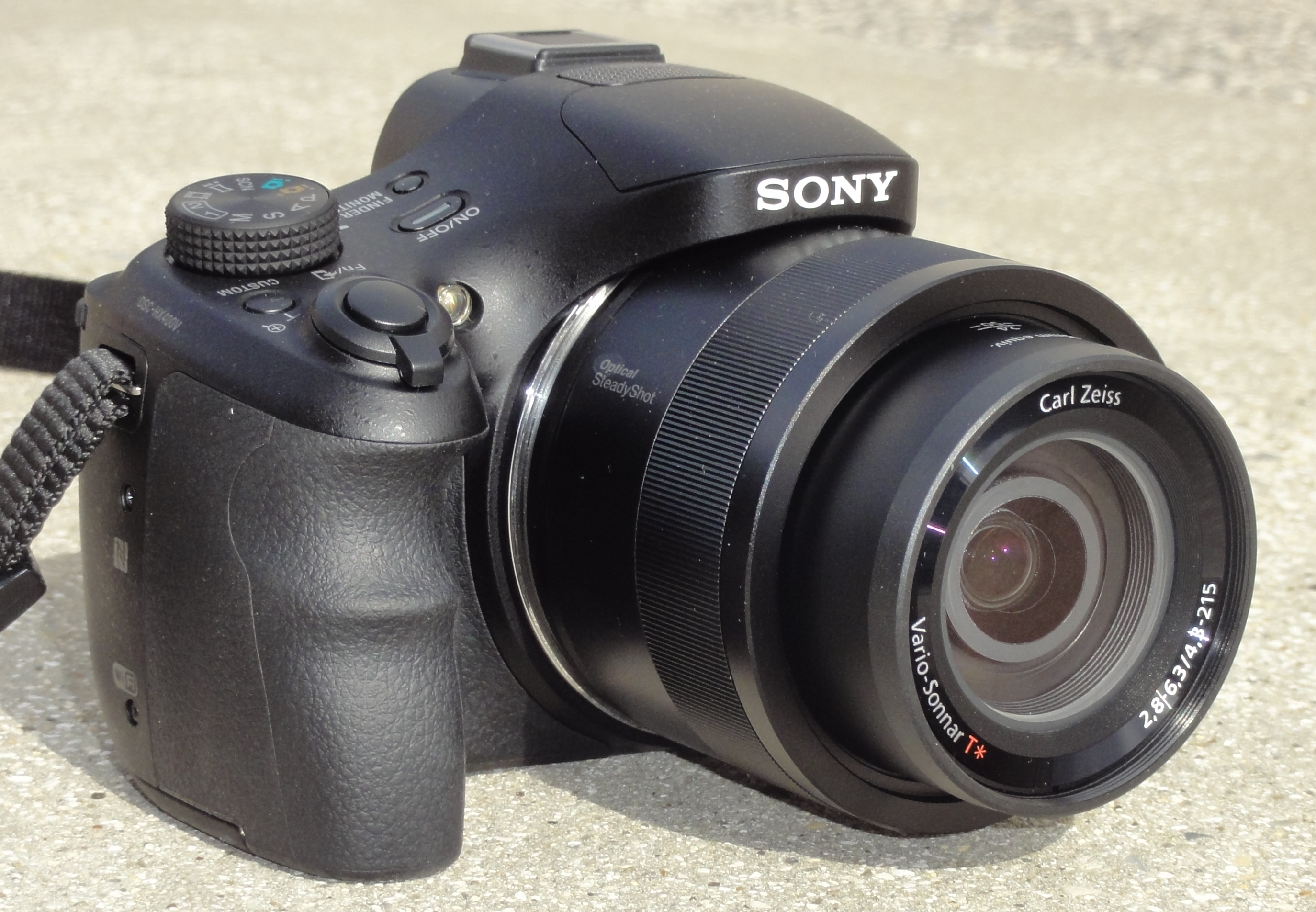

Overview
- Maker: Sony
- Type: Bridge digital camera
- Released: February 12, 2014; 12 years ago
- Intro price: USD 499

Lens
- Lens: Carl Zeiss, 24–1200 mm, 15 elements in 10 groups
- F-numbers: 2.8–8.0 in 1/3-stop increments

Sensor/medium
- Sensor: 1/2.3" (6.17 × 4.55mm) BSI-CMOS sensor
- Maximum resolution: 5184 × 3888 (20.4 megapixels)
- Film speed: ISO 80–3200 (standard); ISO 80–12800 (high sensitivity)
- Storage media: SD, SDHC, SDXC, MS Pro

Focusing
- Focus modes: Automatic, DMF or Manual
- Focus areas: Wide, Center, Flexi-Spot(S/M/L)
- Focus bracketing: ±2.0 EV in ⅓ EV steps

Exposure/metering
- Exposure modes: Manual, Program, iAutomatic, Shutter Priority, Aperture Priority,
- Metering modes: Multi, Center-weighted, Spot

Flash
- Flash: Built-in pop-up; Range: 8.5meters (Auto ISO)
- Flash bracketing: ±2.0 EV in ⅓ EV steps

Shutter
- Shutter speed range: 1/4000 to 30 seconds
- Continuous shooting: 10 fps

Viewfinder
- Viewfinder: Digital and LCD
- Viewfinder magnification: 50× optical zoom

Image processing
- Image processor: Bionz X
- White balance: Auto, Daylight, Cloudy, Incandescent, Fluorescent0, Fluorescent1, Fluorescent2, Flash, C.Temp./Filter, Custom

General
- LCD screen: 3" tilting (4:3) TFT LCD
- Battery: Li Ion NP-BX1, 3.6V, 1240mAh
- Data port(s): USB 2.0, Micro HDMI, WiFi
- Dimensions: 130×93×103 mm (5.1×3.7×4.1 in) (5.1 * 3.67 * 4.06")
- Weight: 660 g (23 oz) (1.46 lb) including battery and memory card

The Sony Cyber-shot DSC-HX400V is a hyperzoom bridge digital camera that features:

- 20.4-megapixel Exmor CMOS sensor
- Fast f/2.8 Carl Zeiss Vario-Sonnar T* 50× optical zoom lens
- Optical SteadyShot and Optical SteadyShot Intelligent Active Mode lens-based stabilisation to reduce blurring from shaky hands
- 100× digital zoom
- Self-timer with 2s and 10s delay or automatic with 1 or 2 face detection
- Full HD (1080p) movie mode
- 3:2, 4:3, 16:9, 1:1 aspect ratios
- Playback pictures in vivid clarity on any compatible 4K Ultra HD TV
- Built-in GPS to record location on photos and videos (HX400V model)
- WiFi for sharing and remote control from smartphones (HX400V model)
- NFC to enable easy sharing of pictures (HX400V model)
- BIONZ X image processor.

The camera has a 3" color LCD and a color electronic viewfinder, and is available in two options; the DSC-HX400 and the DSC-HX400V. The DSC-HX400V has a higher specification, including built-in GPS, WiFi and NFC. The Cyber-shot DSC-HX400V release to the USA was announced on 12 February 2014. The successor to the HX200V and the HX300 with a new sensor and Sony's latest Bionx X processor.

A battery life of up to 300 shots or 150 minutes is achieved from a rechargeable lithium-ion battery which is recharged via the USB port. A cable and adapter are supplied allowing charging from a suitable laptop, PC or from the main supply.

One of the key limitations of the camera is the lack of RAW support.

== Reviews ==
- http://www.sony.co.uk/electronics/cyber-shot-compact-cameras/dsc-hx400-hx400v
- http://snapsort.com/cameras/Sony-Cyber-shot-DSC-HX400V
- http://www.cameralabs.com/reviews/Sony_Cyber-shot_HX400V/
- http://www.dpreview.com/products/sony/compacts/sony_dschx400v
- http://www.photographyblog.com/reviews/sony_cybershot_dsc_hx400v_review/
