= Nikon F-mount =

Lens mount

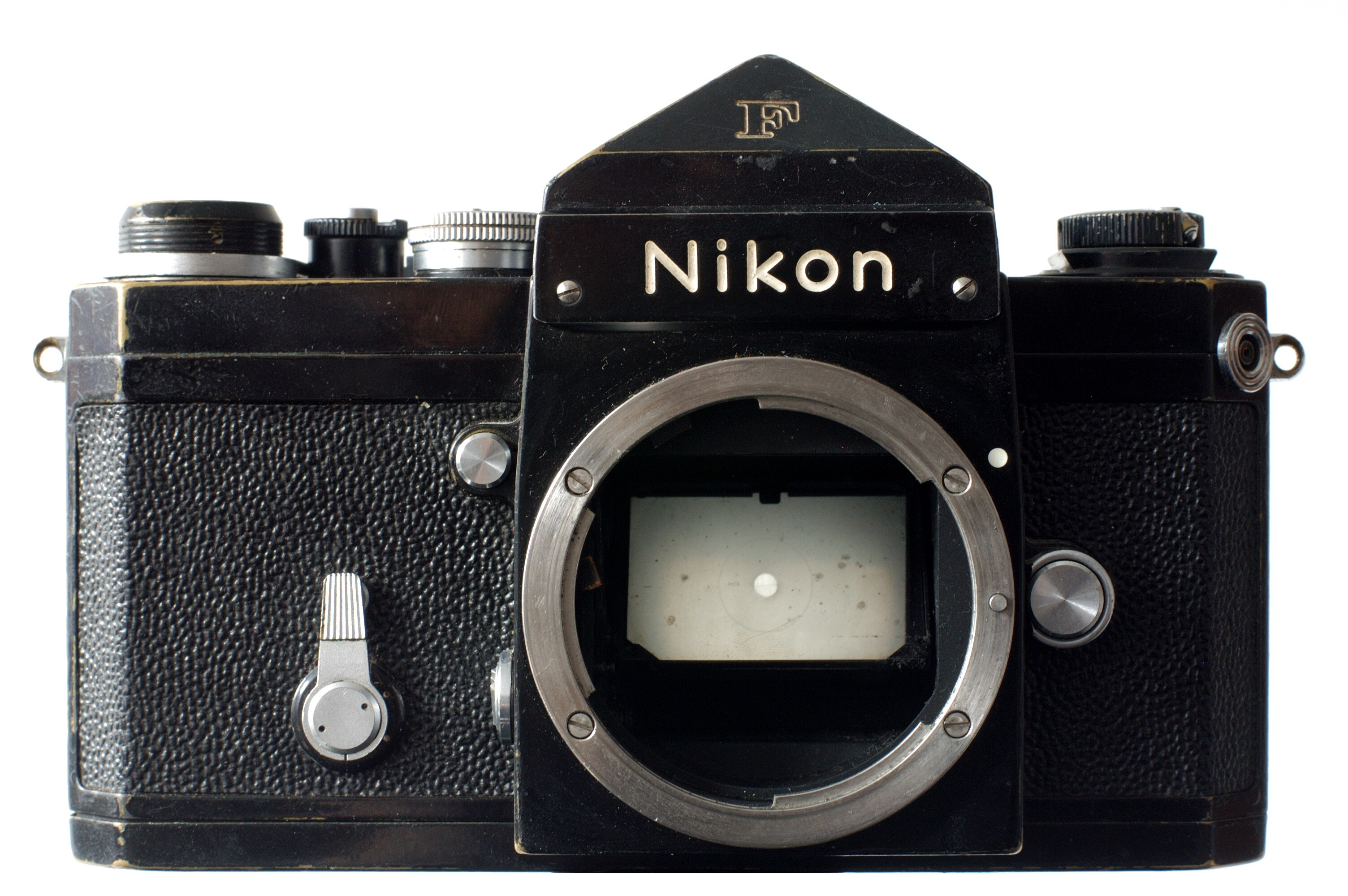
- The Nikon F of 1959 embodies the original F-mount.
- Type: Bayonet
- External diameter: 44 mm
- Tabs: 3
- Flange: 46.5 mm
- Connectors: Varied over the years, including; 5-Pin: Found on older autofocus (AF) screw-drive lenses.; 6-pin: Rare. Only 2 lenses and 3 cameras; 7-Pin: Standard for most AF-I and AF-S lenses with internal motors.; 8-Pin: Extra ground, commonly used on newer lenses for body communication.; 10-Pin: On some high-end AF-S lenses and teleconverters to support advanced communication and power.
- Introduced: 1959

The Nikon F-mount is a type of interchangeable lens mount developed by Nikon for its 35mm format single-lens reflex cameras. The F-mount was first introduced on the Nikon F camera in 1959, and features a three-lug bayonet mount with a 44 mm throat and a flange to focal plane distance of 46.5 mm. The company continues, with the 2020 D6 model, to use variations of the same lens mount specification for its film and digital SLR cameras.

The Nikon F-mount successor is the Nikon Z-mount. The FTZ II (and the original FTZ) lens adapter allows many F-mount lenses to be used on Z-mount cameras.

== History ==
The Nikon F-mount is one of only two SLR lens mounts (the other being the Pentax K-mount) which were not abandoned by their associated manufacturer upon the introduction of autofocus, but rather extended to meet new requirements related to metering, autofocus, and aperture control. The large variety of F-mount compatible lenses makes it the largest system of interchangeable flange-mount photographic lenses in history. Over 400 different Nikkor lenses are compatible with the system. The F-mount is also popular in scientific and industrial applications, most notably machine vision. The F-mount has been in production for over 67 years, the only SLR lens mount with such longevity.

== Design ==
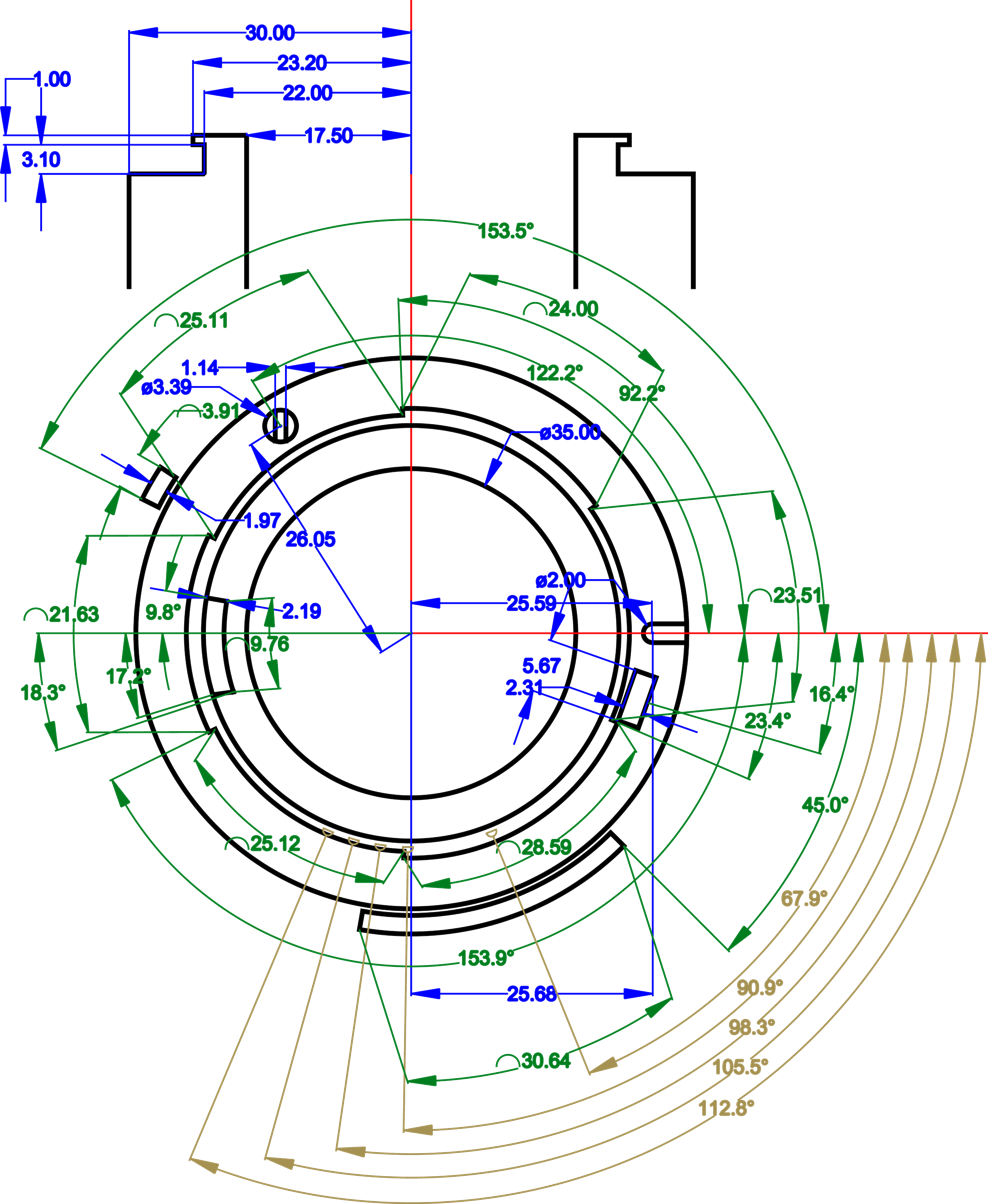
Nikon F-mount dimensions

=== System of lenses ===
In addition to Nikon's own range of "Nikkor" lenses, brands of F-mount photographic lenses include Zeiss, Voigtländer, Schneider, Angénieux, Samyang, Sigma, Tokina, Tamron, Hartblei, Kiev-Arsenal, Lensbaby, and Vivitar. F-mount cameras include current models from Nikon, Fujifilm, Sinar, JVC, Kenko and Horseman. Numerous other manufacturers employ the F-mount in non-photographic imaging applications.

=== Compatibility ===
The F-mount has a significant degree of both backward and forward compatibility. Many current autofocus F-mount lenses can be used on the original Nikon F, and the earliest manual-focus F-mount lenses of the 1960s and early 1970s can, with some modification, still be used to their fullest on all professional-class Nikon cameras. Incompatibilities do exist, however, and adventurous F-mount users should consult product documentation in order to avoid problems. For example, many electronic camera bodies cannot meter without a CPU enabled lens; the aperture of G designated lenses cannot be controlled without an electronic camera body; non-AI lenses (manufactured prior to 1977) can cause mechanical damage to later model bodies unless they are modified to meet the AI specification; and AF-P lenses (introduced in 2016) will not focus, even manually, on cameras introduced before roughly 2013. Many manual focus lenses can be converted to allow metering with consumer Nikon bodies by adding a Dandelion chip to the lens.

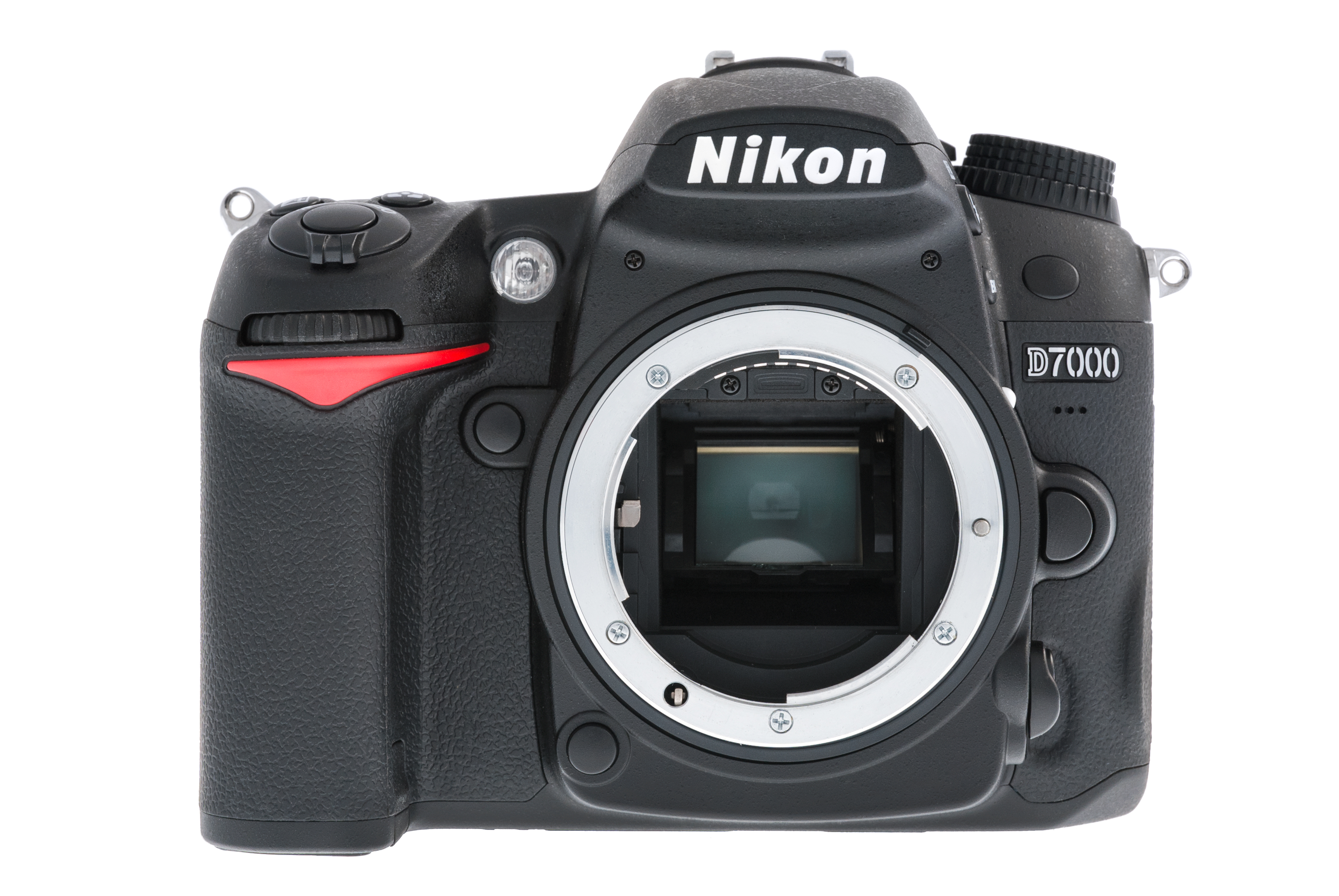
The Nikon D7000 reveals a modern F-mount design, including aperture lever (left), CPU contacts (top), and mechanical AF linkage (lower left).

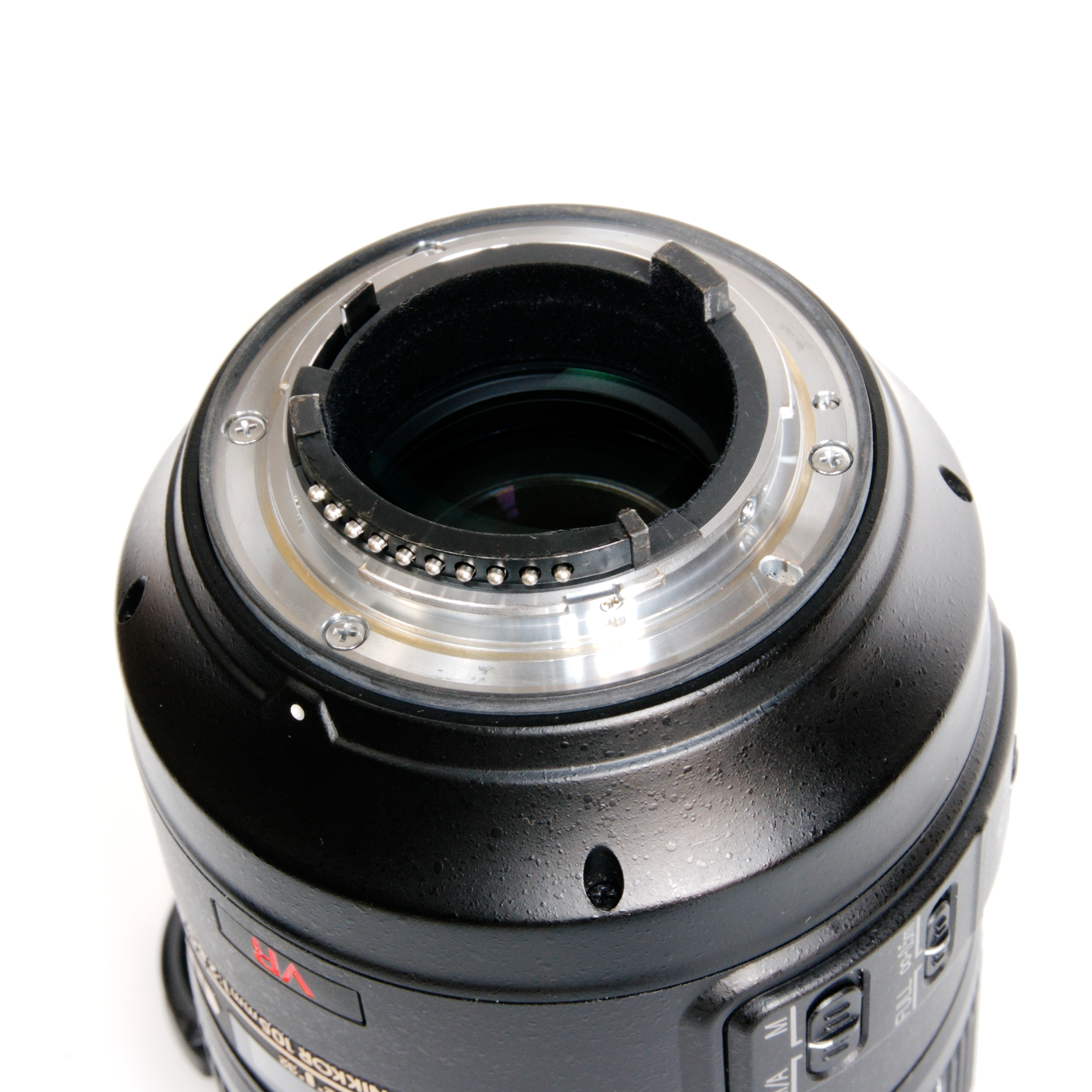
The flange of a current F-mount lens, including aperture lever (upper left) and CPU contacts (bottom).

=== Image circle ===
Most Nikon F-mount lenses cover a minimum of the standard 36×24 mm area of 35mm format and the Nikon FX format, while DX designated lenses cover the 24×16 mm area of the Nikon DX format, and industrial F-mount lenses have varying coverage. DX lenses may produce vignetting when used on film and FX cameras. However, Nikon lenses designed for film cameras will work on Nikon digital system cameras with the limitations noted above.

=== Mounting and control rings ===
F-mount lenses lock by turning counter-clockwise (when looking at the front of lens) and unlock clockwise. Nearly all F-mount lenses have zoom and focus controls that rotate in the clockwise direction (as viewed from behind the camera) to increase focal length and focus distance respectively. This convention is also used in Pentax K-mount and Sony A-mount lenses but is opposite of the direction normally used by Canon. F-mount lenses also typically have aperture rings that turn clockwise to close. The aperture rings can have up to two sets of f-stop numbers, with the bottom set being smaller. On cameras equipped with Nikon's Aperture Direct Readout (ADR) system, a small window under the pentaprism reads the smaller scale and displays the selected f-stop in the viewfinder.

== Nikkor ==
=== Designations ===
Nikon has introduced many proprietary designations for F-mount Nikkor lenses, reflecting design variations and developments both in lenses and the F-mount itself. There are also "unofficial" designations used by collectors and dealers to differentiate similar lenses.

==== Pre-autofocus ====
There are four major generations of manual-focus Nikkor lens styles, which may be distinguished cosmetically and functionally:

Manual-focus Nikkor lenses
Name	AKA	Example	Cosmetics			Body will meter at full aperture		
Name	AKA	Example	Focus ring	Meter coupling	Aperture scale	NAI	AI	AI-S
A	F, C, Auto, NAI	F-type ("Pre-AI") lens: Nikkor 50mm 1:1.4.	Scalloped metal	Solid prong, triangular or semicircular	Single row of values, multicolored	Yes	No (stop-down)	
K	RIFR	K-type lens: Fisheye-Nikkor 16mm 1:3.5.	Rubber inset, diamond or waffle pattern	Solid prong, triangular or semicircular	Single row of values, multicolored	Yes	No (stop-down)	
AI	—N/a	AI lens: Nikkor 135mm 1:2.8; note multicolored aperture values corresponding to the depth of field scale.	Rubber inset, waffle pattern	Cutaway semicircular prong + ridge	Doubled, large multicolored values and small ADR values in white only	Yes		Maybe
AI-S	—N/a	AI-S lens: Nikkor 50mm 1:1.4; note the smallest aperture value (f/16) is colored orange on both scales.	Rubber inset, waffle pattern	Cutaway semicircular prong + ridge	Doubled, smallest value in orange on both regular and ADR scales	Yes		

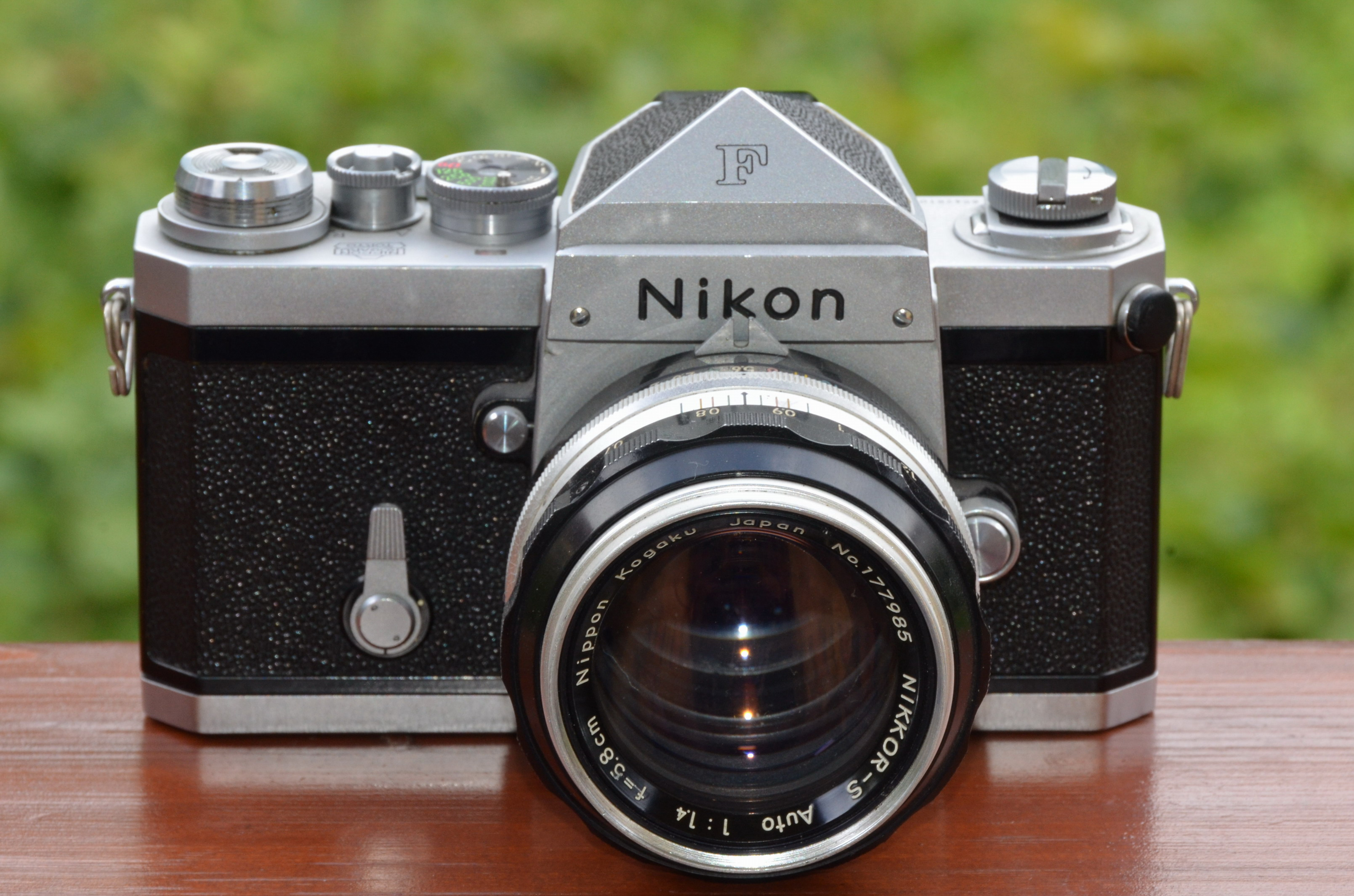
Nikon F professional SLR camera with eyelevel prism and early NIKKOR-S Auto 1,4 f=5,8cm lens (1959)

A — Auto Nikkor (also unofficially F, Pre-AI, Non-AI or NAI), introduced in 1959
Designation for the first generation of F-mount lenses, introduced in 1959. These were all single-coated, and meter coupling was provided by a prong (known as the Meter Coupling Prong) fixed to the lens's aperture ring. The Photomic T through-the-lens light meter introduced in 1965 worked at full aperture, so the maximum aperture of the lens had to be communicated to the meter via a manual setting on the ASA dial. The Nikkormat FTn and FTn metered finder for the Nikon F introduced semi-automatic aperture indexing which was achieved by mounting the lens with the aperture ring set to f/5.6, and then turning the ring to first the minimum and then the maximum apertures. (The need for this step was eliminated by the AI system below.) Early versions are marked "Nippon Kogaku Japan" and have their focal lengths stated in centimetres, but models produced after about 1965 have focal lengths stated in millimetres. The "Nippon Kogaku Japan" engraving was replaced by "Nikon" from 1971 onwards.
Mounting a non-AI lens can damage many modern Nikon camera bodies. AI-cameras that still may use non-AI lenses includes the Nikon F2A/F2AS with Photomic A (DP-11) or AS (DP-12) finder, Nikon (Nikkormat) EL2, as well as Nikon FM and FE. In addition, the Nikon Df, a DSLR introduced in late 2013, can use non-AI lenses. The A lenses can be converted to the AI specification; see AI'd below.
- T, Q, P, H, S, O, N, UD, QD, PD — Appears immediately before or after the "Nikkor" name on F-type lenses (see above), designating the number of optical elements in the design. Short for Tres (3), Quattuor (4), Penta (5), Hex (6), Septem (7), Octo (8), Novem (9), UnDecim (11), QuattuorDecim (14) and Penta-Decem (15). The terms Unus (1) and Bini (2) were also apparently designated, but never used. Terms P=Penta, H=Hexa, and PD=Penta-Decem (Greek root) were used (instead of Quinque, Sex, and QuinDecim) to avoid ambiguity with Quattuor, Septem and QuattuorDecim. This designation scheme was dropped with the introduction of "Modern" (K-type) Nikkors in 1974.
- Auto — Designation for F-type lenses indicating an automatic diaphragm (aperture). Not to be confused with automatic exposure or auto focus, the designation fell out of use in the early 1970s and was not carried onto K-type lenses.
- C — Indicates a multicoated F-type lens. Appears with an interpunct after the number of optical elements (in the form "Nikkor-X·C"). This designation was introduced in 1971 and discontinued in 1974 with the introduction of "Modern" (K-type) Nikkors, when multicoating had become standard practice.

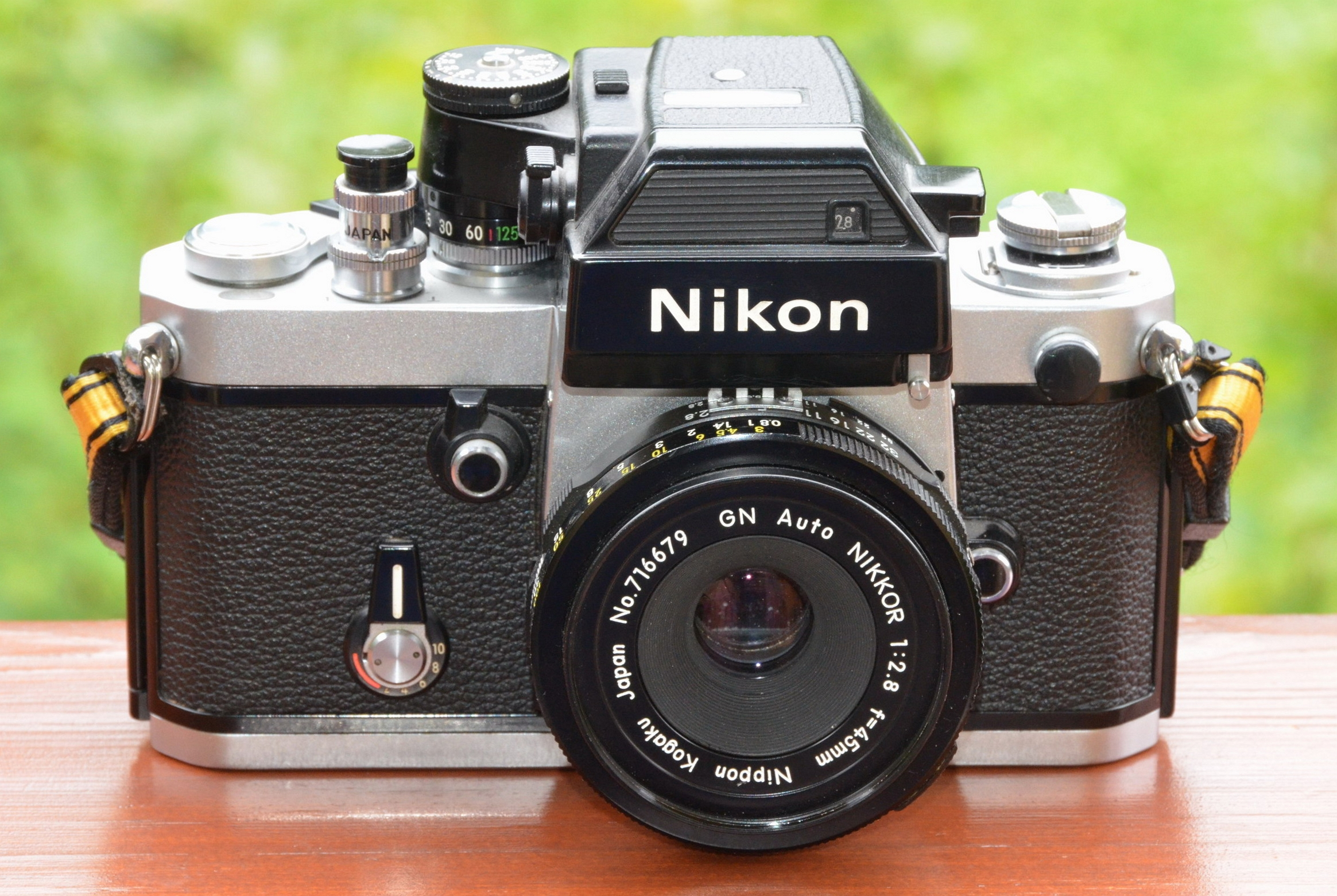
Nikon F2SB professional SLR camera with GN Auto Nikkor 1:2,8 f=45mm AI lens

K — "Modern" or "New" Nikkors introduced in 1974
While Pre-AI for compatibility purposes, K-type lenses introduced the new cosmetics that would be used from 1977 onwards for AI-type lenses (see below). The scalloped-metal focus rings were replaced with rubber grip insets, and the use of element number and coating designations was discontinued. The 'K' designation itself is believed to be derived from the Japanese "konnichi-teki", loosely translatable as "modern" or "contemporary".

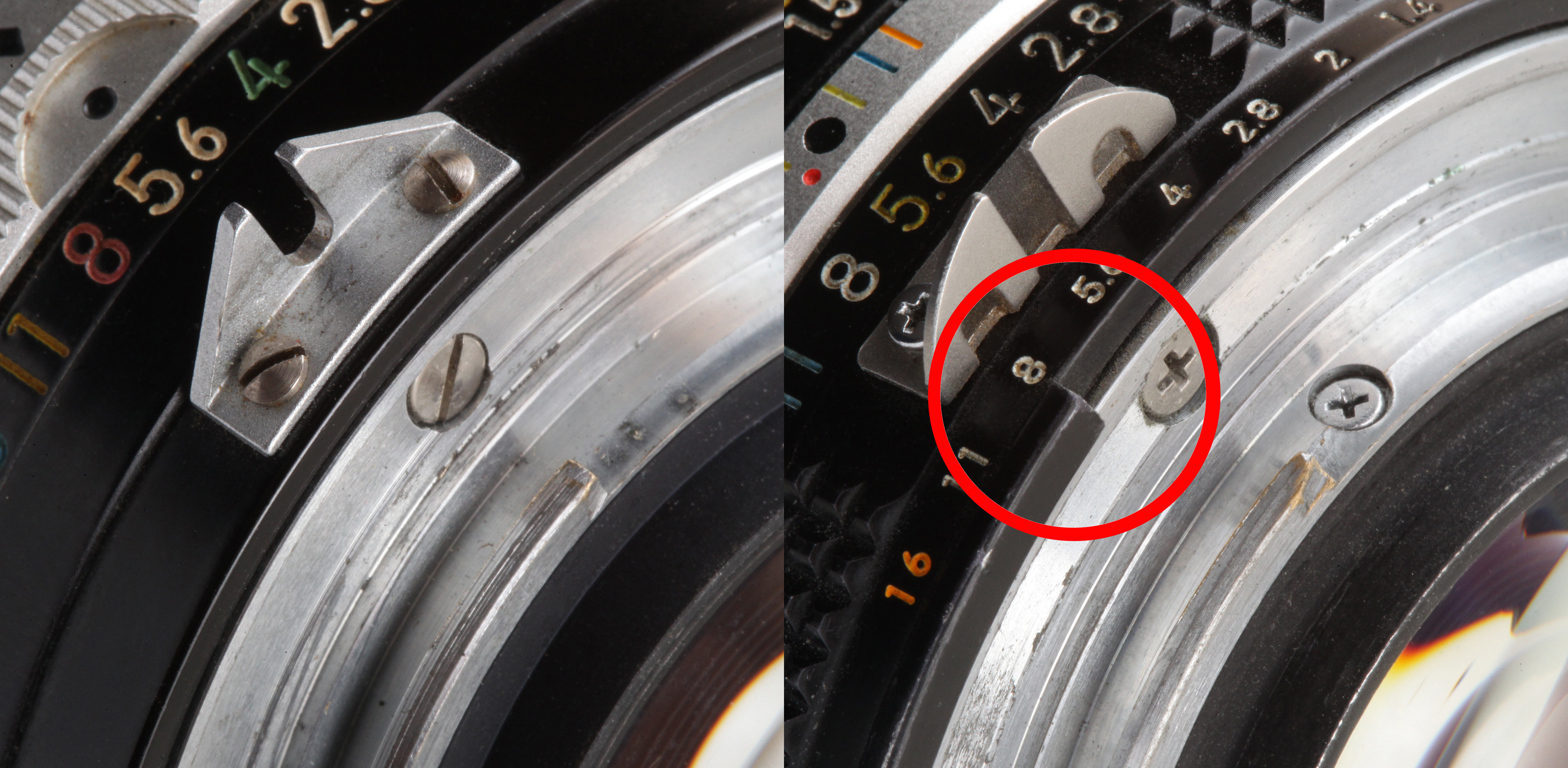
Comparison of non-AI (left) and AI (right) aperture signaling systems: note differences in meter coupling prong style and presence of AI meter coupling ridge.The coupling prongs in non-AI have no holes in them. Some non-AI lenses were later factory-converted (using a kit from the factory) to AI. When this was the case the prongs were also replaced with AI style prongs. This can be used to identify factory AI conversion kits without looking at the coupling ridge. (May be useful in online buying of lenses.)

AI — Manual focus with "Automatic Maximum-Aperture Indexing," introduced in 1977
The AI standard adds a Meter Coupling Ridge to the aperture ring, which encodes the current aperture setting relative to the maximum, and a Lens Speed Indexing Post on the mounting flange, which encodes the maximum aperture itself. The Ridge and Post couple to the camera's light meter. Lenses designated AI-S, Series E, and AF all include these features of AI. Current professional Nikon camera bodies link with the Meter Coupling Ridge, but the Lens Speed Indexing Post is ignored and the maximum aperture value is set electronically by the operator instead. AI-designated lenses also improved on the original Meter Coupling Prong, adding cutaways which allow more ambient light to fall on the aperture ring, increasing visibility on cameras which optically projected the setting inside the viewfinder.
- AI'd — An unofficial designation for lenses converted partially (Meter Coupling Ridge only) or completely from non-AI to AI. This is accomplished by replacing the aperture ring and the metering prong (using a long-discontinued kit procured from Nikon, also known as a factory conversion) or by modifying the original part. A conversion is also possible by taking a grinder to the meter coupling ridge. One can find such hacked lenses in the used marked quite often. For collectors of classic lenses, such hacks are undesirable and considered to be damaged lenses although they function normally if the hack is performed correctly. Some independent camera repair technicians continue to offer these conversions. The factory conversion kit included a new set of coupling prongs, with holes in them. This can be easily used to identify a "factory conversion" AI'd lens.

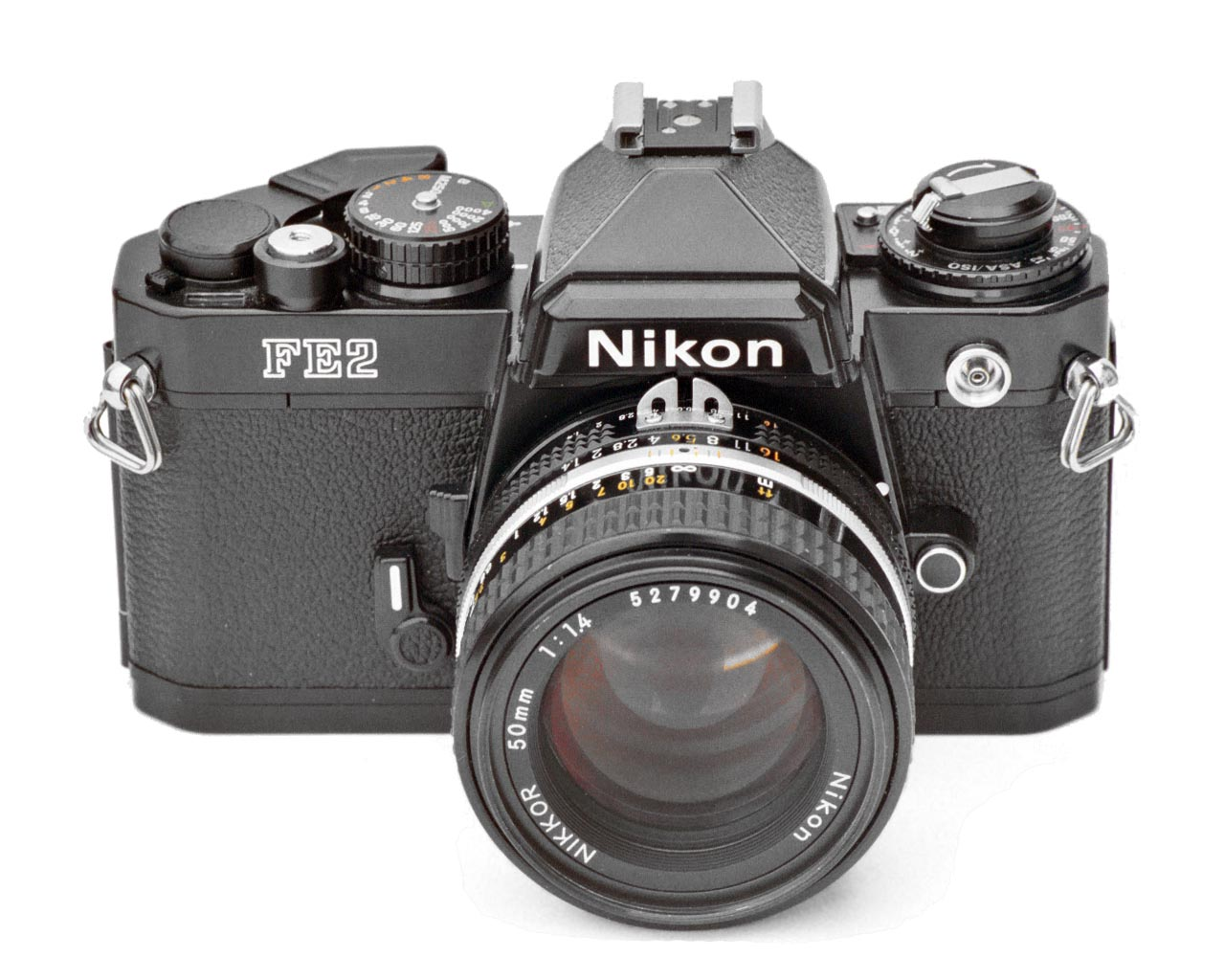
A typical AI-S lens: A Nikkor 50mm 1:1.4 showing "Nikon" engravings, rubber focus ring, and new-style Meter Coupling Prong distinguished by its cutaway sections. The lens is mounted on a Nikon FE2 camera.

AI-S — AI lenses with standardized aperture control, introduced in 1981
The successor to AI, the AI-S specification added two mechanical enhancements — standardized aperture control, and the Focal Length Indexing Ridge — required for the shutter priority and other auto-aperture exposure modes of the Nikon FA, F-301/N2000, and F-501/N2020 cameras (although the FA will operate correctly in shutter priority and program modes with any AI lens). Later cameras did not require these features, and interoperate with AI and AI-S lenses identically. The term AI-S is now commonly used to refer to manual focus lenses, and Nikon continues to produce eight prime lens models in its AI-S line. All Nikon AF lenses with aperture rings (non-G) also meet the AI-S specification, except for their lack of a Meter Coupling Prong (which can be added). Visually, AI-S lenses can quickly be identified by the smallest aperture setting (usually f/22) being marked in orange,
- Standardized aperture control. AI-S lens apertures move in a standardized fashion in relation to their stop-down levers. The levers of AI and pre-AI lenses were intended only to close the aperture to its manual setting. The advance of aperture control by the camera body itself, by partial actuation of the stop-down lever, meant more precision was required for consistent exposure. This feature is indicated by a Lens Type Signal notch in the lens mount. Note that despite popular misconception, the F4 is NOT capable of engaging P and S auto-exposure modes with non-CPU lenses
- Focal Length Indexing Ridge. AI-S lenses with a focal length of 135mm or longer are indicated by a ridge on the lens mount, used by FA and F-501 to engage high-speed-biased Program Autoexposure.

==== Autofocus lenses ====
AF Nikkor 28–85 mm 1:3.5–4.5 zoom lenses

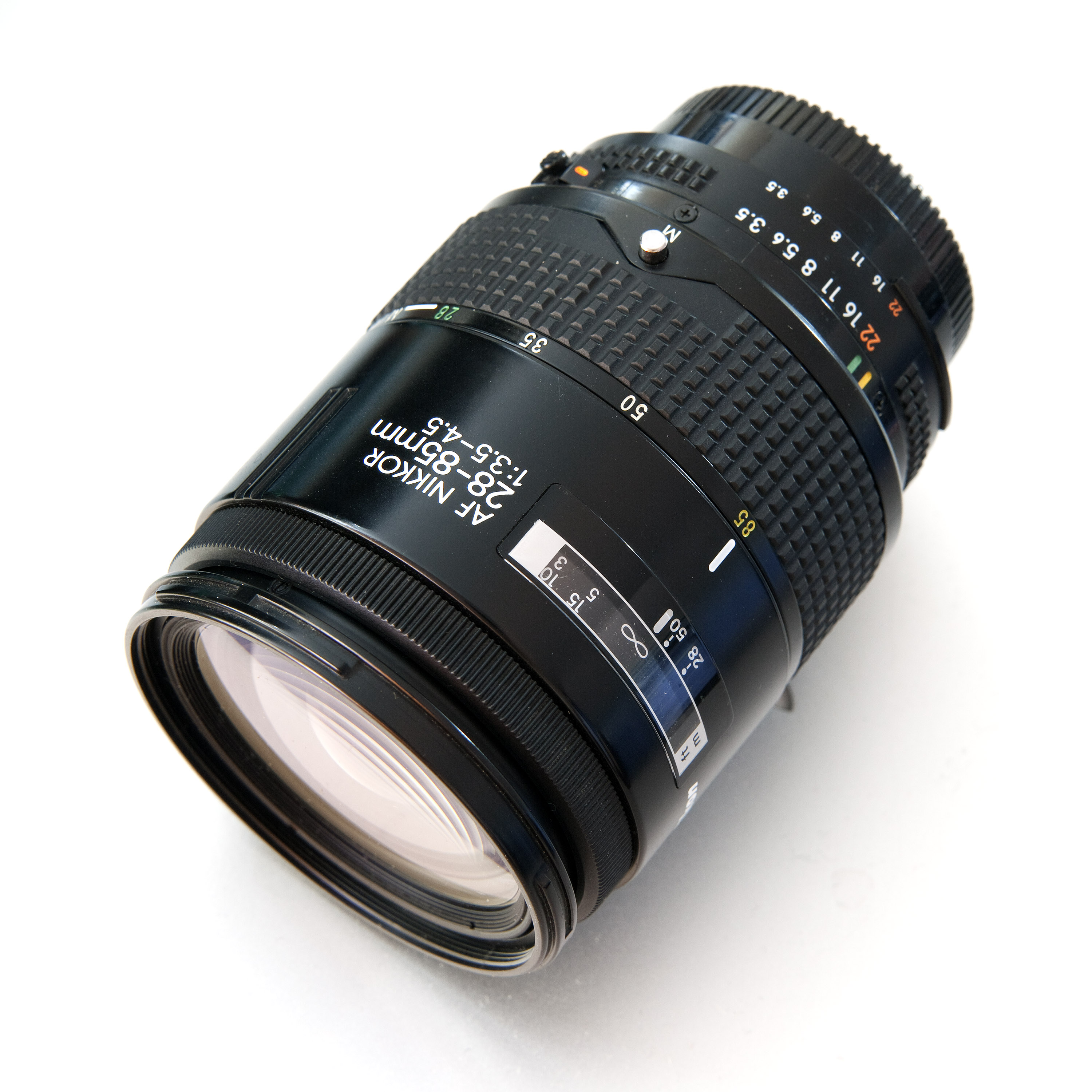
Original AF version; hard plastic focusing ring (at front) with narrow ribbing.

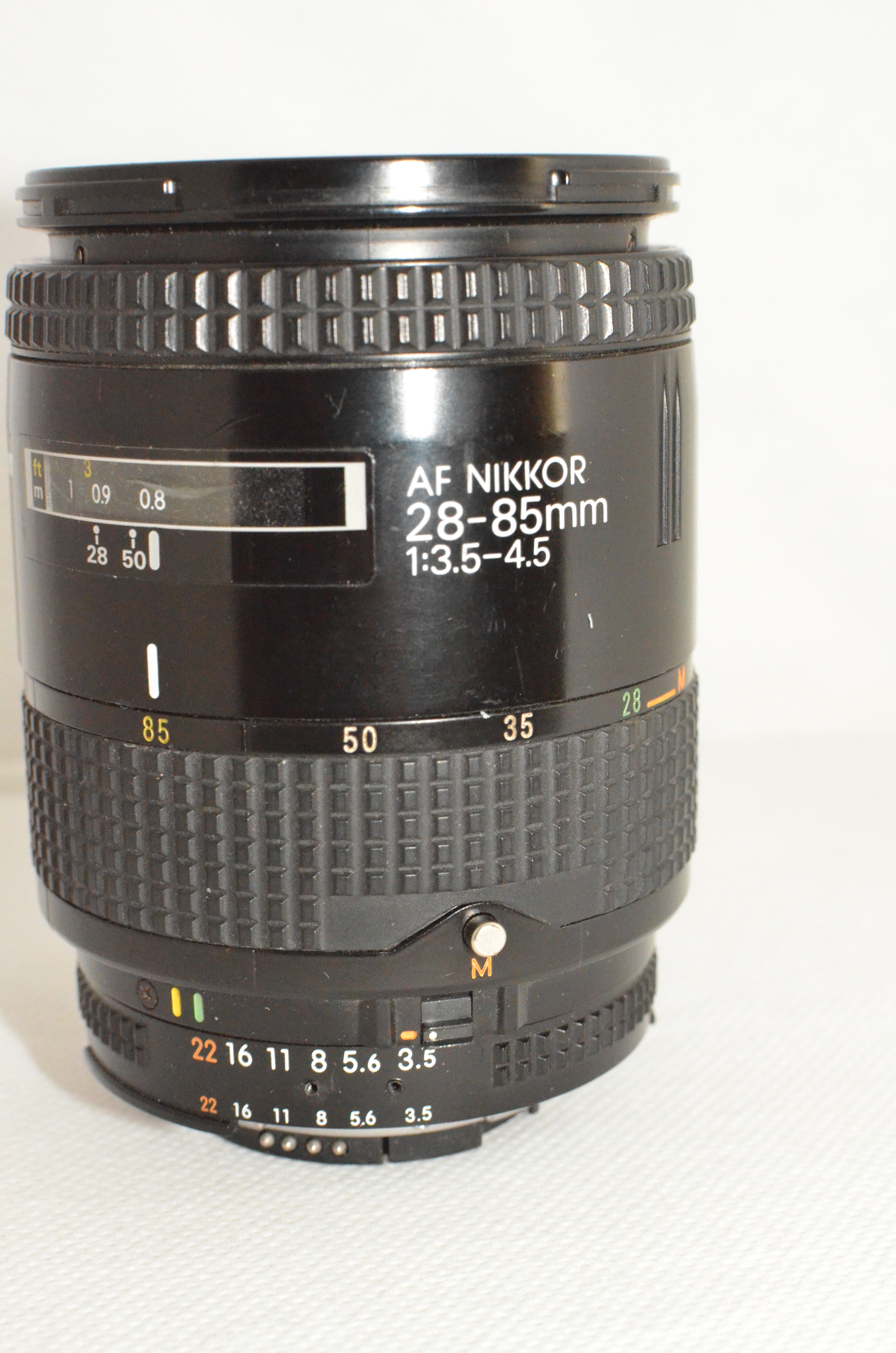
Revised AF-N version; the focusing ring has a rubber inset.

AF (autofocus)
The original autofocus designation, indicating focus driven by a motor inside the camera body. All AF lenses have an integrated CPU (microprocessor). Used in the form "AF Nikkor", this should not be confused with the original autofocus lenses for the F3AF camera, which were designated "AF-Nikkor" and are considered predecessors to AF-I lenses.
AF-N (autofocus, new version)
Indicates the "New" version of an AF lens. The change from plastic focus rings on early AF lenses to the a new "rubber inset focus ring" (RIFR) is often indicated by the AF-N designation. Introduced in 1990.
AF-I (autofocus, internal focus motor)
Driven by a coreless DC motor. Used only in long telephoto lenses (300 mm f/2.8 through 600 mm f/4.0). Introduced in 1992.
AF-D (autofocus with distance encoder)
Designation for an AF lens (as above) with "D" functionality (see "D" below). Introduced in 1992.

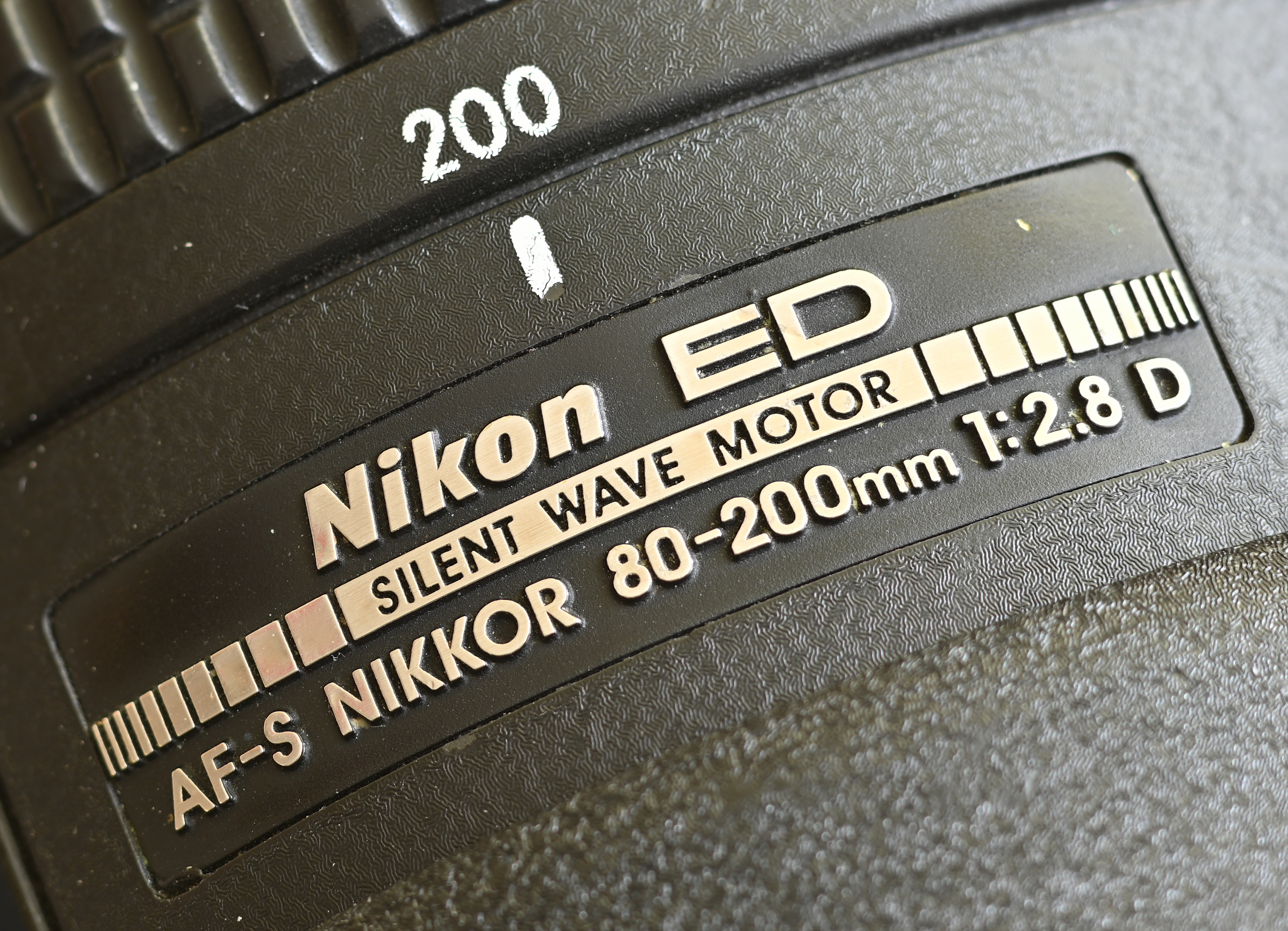
Nameplate of a 1st generation AF-S lens with original "Silent Wave Motor" design

AF-S (autofocus with silent internal motor)
Uses a "Silent Wave Motor" (SWM) (ultrasonic motor) to focus quietly and quickly. Similar to Canon's "USM" technology. Introduced in 1996.
AF-P (autofocus with internal stepper motor)
Autofocus using a stepper motor. First F-Mount lens in 2015 after being introduced 2011 in the Nikon 1-mount. All DX AF-P lenses omit the physical AF/MF switch — those with Vibration Reduction (VR) omit the VR-switch.
Fully AF-P compatible without any firmware update are the Nikon D850, D500, D7500, D5600, D3400, D3500, Nikon-1 series with FT1 adapter and newer DSLR cameras. The Nikon Z-mount cameras with FTZ adapter are also fully compatible. Fully AF-P compatible after update are the Nikon D5, D5500 and D5300. After update the following cameras lack a software VR-switch: D4S, D4, D810, D810A, D800, D800E, D750, D610, D600, Df, D7200, D7100 and D3300 – if the lens includes no physical VR-switch, VR is always on. Additionally they lack "Manual focus ring in AF mode", the manual override of autofocus.
The Nikon D3X, D3S, D3, D700, D300, D300S, D7000 and D2XS operate only AF-P FX lenses with additionally restrictions that after a reactivation from the standby mode a (quick) automatic or manual refocusing must take place as the focus is reset to infinity as they wake up. To avoid this, the standby time may be set in the camera for a longer time or "Unlimited". The D5200 works with DX and FX lenses, but additionally displays a "Lens not attached" message if a lens lock switch was activated when the camera is turned on.
The AF-P focus motor will not work with all Nikon film cameras and D1 to other D2 series, D200, D100, D5100, D5000, D90, D80, D70 series, D3200, D3100, D3000, D60, D50, D40 and D40X. Standard is VR = on and focus to infinity with all cameras only supporting E-type lenses. Not to be confused with old AI-P "Program" (CPU) lenses.

=== Lens feature and design information ===
==== Electromechanical and data communication ====
- CPU — Central Processing Unit. The lens is fitted with electrical contacts for digital communication with the camera. All AF and AI-P lenses are CPU lenses. Some non-professional Nikon cameras require CPU lenses for metered operation. This designation appears in specifications but not lens names.
- D — Distance. Indicated after the f-number in the name, and also occasionally designated AF-D. The integrated CPU electronically communicates focus distance information, which is incorporated into the camera's exposure calculations in 3D Matrix Metering mode, and also D-TTL and I-TTL flash autoexposure. All AF-I, AF-S, G-type and E-type lenses are also D-type.
- E — Electromagnetic diaphragm. The aperture diaphragm of an E lens is controlled digitally by the camera, and actuated electromagnetically by a system housed within the lens, rather than employing the F-mount's traditional mechanical diaphragm linkage. This system first appeared in certain Perspective Control lenses, designated PC-E (with designs that preclude a mechanical linkage). E-type lenses aperture control is only supported by all DSLRs with CMOS image sensor except the Nikon D90. The Nikon Z-mount cameras with FTZ adapter are also fully compatible. For all other cameras the lens aperture stays maximum open with normal autofocus and metering. E Lenses with manual aperture control like PC-E lenses allow manual diaphragm operation on all cameras, with possible unreliable metering on DSLRs without E-type support. Otherwise E lenses are similar to G lenses. Not to be confused with old AI-S Series E lenses.
- G — Designation for lenses without an aperture ring, indicated after the f-number in the name. G lenses retain the mechanical diaphragm coupling of other Nikkors, but the aperture setting can only be controlled by the camera body. All Nikon DSLRs and the film autofocus bodies with command dials are capable of controlling G lenses. Older film autofocus bodies will work with G lenses in shutter priority and program modes with full opened aperture. Some recent G lenses feature a weatherproofing gasket around the mounting flange. G lenses otherwise have the same characteristics as D lenses.
- P or AI-P — "AI with Program." CPU-enabled variation of manual focus AI-S lens. Includes only the 45/2.8P, 500/4P and 1200-1700/5.6-8P Nikkor lenses. Zeiss ZF.2 and Voigtländer SL II lenses are also AI-P designs, although they are not designated as such. Not to be confused with early lenses marked "Nikkor-P" meaning a 5-element lens (see pre-autofocus designations above).

==== Optical design ====
- Aspherical — Aspheric lens elements. Also Hybrid used: Thin molded aspheric elements coupled to a conventional glass element. This designation appears in specifications but not lens names.
- CRC — Close Range Correction. Improved performance at close focus distances, achieved by "floating" lens element(s) which move differently relative to the movement of the other focusing elements. This designation appears in specifications but not lens names.
- DC — Defocus Control. DC lenses have a separate control ring for spherical aberration, which affects primarily the appearance of out-of-focus areas, also known as bokeh. At extreme settings, DC lenses can generate an overall soft focus effect. Includes only the AF DC-Nikkor 105mm f/2D and AF DC-Nikkor 135mm f/2D.
- ED — "Extra-low Dispersion" glass incorporated to reduce chromatic aberration. Lenses using ED elements usually carry a gold ring around the barrel to indicate the fact (although on some low-end lenses gold foil is used instead), and older lenses were also marked "NIKKOR✻ED". In addition to normal ED glass, "Super ED" glass is used in some lenses.
- FL — FLuorite lens element(s). Designates a lens which includes one or more elements constructed of fluorite instead of glass. Currently includes the AF-S 800mm f/5.6E FL ED VR, available since 2013, the AF-S 400mm f/2.8E FL ED VR, available since 2014, the AF-S 500mm f/4E FL ED VR and AF-S 600mm f/4E FL ED VR, available since 2015, and the AF-S 70-200mm f/2.8E FL ED VR, available since 2016.
- GN — Guide Number. Assists in flash exposure on cameras without automatic flash metering. The flash's guide number is set on the lens, and the aperture is accordingly coupled to the lens's focus ring for correct exposure. The only GN lens, the supercompact GN Auto Nikkor (it was the second smallest Nikon F-mount lens ever made), was built during the late 1960s and early 1970s. An updated variant with a lens hood was made through the 1990s alongside the FM3a.
- HRI — High Refractive Index elements. Contains elements with a refractive index >2. This designation appears in specifications but not lens names.
- IF — Internal Focus. Focusing is accomplished through the movement of internal lens group(s), instead of extending the entire lens, allowing focus to be driven quickly by a small motor. When applied to zooms, IF often eliminates rotation of the front lens element, which means IF lenses also allow the use of a polarizing filter without the need to readjust it after focus.
- Micro — Micro-Nikkor lenses are capable of high reproduction ratios, typically 1:2 or 1:1, for macro photography. Industrial Nikkor lenses designed for greater than 1:1 reproduction are, in contrast, labeled Macro-Nikkor. The first Micro-Nikkor lenses were created for producing microforms of Kanji text.
- N — Indicates the Nano Crystal Coat, a relatively new type of lens coating that originated in Nikon's semiconductor division. Lenses with this coating feature the logo of an "N" inside an elongated hexagon on the name plate.
- NIC — Nikon Integrated Coating, a proprietary multicoating. Appears in specifications but not lens names.
- PC — Perspective Control. Lens features shift movements to control perspective and depth-of-field; some PC lenses also feature tilt movements. Newer PC lenses are designated PC-E, indicating these use an electromagnetic diaphragm control, per designation E above. Not to be confused with early lenses marked "Nikkor-P·C" meaning a five-element coated lens (see pre-autofocus designations above).
- PF — Phase Fresnel element to counteract chromatic aberration. It replaces several lens elements, thus reducing the size and weight of a lens. Like a refracting Fresnel lens, the PF element has concentric rings; however, the PF rings are smaller than visible wavelengths of light to take advantage of anomalous dispersion through diffraction, rather than refraction.
- Reflex — Designates a catadioptric (mirror) lens.
- RF — Rear Focusing. Quite similar to internal focusing. Focusing is accomplished through the movement of rear lens groups, eliminating extension and rotation of the front lens element, allowing focus to be driven quickly by a small motor. RF lenses also allow the use of a polarizing filter without the need to readjust it after focus.
- SIC — Super Integrated Coating, a proprietary multicoating. Appears in specifications but not lens names.
- UV — Lenses designed for imaging ultraviolet light.
- VR — Vibration Reduction. Uses a moving optical group to reduce the photographic effects of camera shake. Some VR lenses also support a panning mode, detecting horizontal movement of the lens and minimizing only vertical vibration. The second generation of VR is called VR II, which is designed to offer another 1-stop advantage over original VR, but lenses with this feature are still designated simply "VR."

==== Alternate product lines ====
- DX — Lens designed for the smaller Nikon DX format (APS-C). All Nikon FX format (35mm full-frame) cameras detect DX lenses and automatically use a cropped DX compatible image sensor area. Vignetting may occur if used on a 35mm format film camera or a manually selected DSLR full-frame mode, although some DX lenses cover the full 135 frame at longer focal lengths.
- IX — Lenses designed for use with the now-defunct Pronea APS SLR. These are all autofocus zoom lenses. They are not compatible with cameras outside of the Pronea system unless mirror lock-up is used
- Series E — A line of eight lower-cost lenses manufactured during the 1980s for Nikon's amateur SLRs. They sacrificed some construction quality and employed simpler but often surprisingly good optical designs. Series E lenses were built to the AI-S specification. Later Series E lenses are identifiable by a metal ring on the barrel. None of this family of lenses were branded Nikkor, instead carrying the text "Nikon Lens Series E." Not to be confused with E - type autofocus and electromagnetic diaphragm lenses.

==== Specialized lenses ====
- Bellows — Lens designed exclusively for use on a bellows unit, primarily for macro photography. Also called short mount. Since some Nikon bellows allow for a front rise, they allow a limited variety of lenses to be used similarly to a PC lens (see Optical design above).
- Fisheye-Nikkor — Fisheye lenses producing either a circular image on the film plane/imager or a partially circular image. Can be as wide as 220° or typically 180°. Fisheye lenses are based upon an equidistant projection formula, or an orthographic projection (OP).
- LW — Amphibian lens. Produced for Nikonos system, featuring a Nikonos lens mount, waterproof, but not designed for underwater use. Ideal for surfers, speleologists.
- Medical — Nikkor designation for a macro lens with a built-in ring light strobe system, designed for clinical and scientific applications.
- Noct — "Night." Specialty low-light lens designed for maximum sharpness at the widest aperture setting. The name was used with one F-mount lens, the Noct-Nikkor 58mm f/1.2, and was revived for the Z-mount with the Nikkor Z 58mm f/0.95 S Noct.
- OP — Orthographic Projection. The 10 mm OP Fisheye-Nikkor uses an orthographic image mapping function rather than the equidistant image used on most other fisheye lenses. This is useful for measuring the amount of sky blocked by a building or object. This maintains the same brightness in the image as in the object, with no falloff at the edges.
- UW — Underwater lenses. Produced for the Nikonos systems.

=== Manual-focus lenses ===
==== Manual-focus prime lenses ====
===== Fisheye lenses =====
Fisheye-Nikkor manual-focus fisheye lenses
Lens	Intro	Ap.	Eles / Grps	Min. Focus	Angle of view	Circular / Full-frame	Mount types	Weight	Size (Dia. × Len.)	Filter Thread (mm)	Photo	Notes
6 mm f/2.8	Mar 1972	f/2.8–22	12/9	0.25 m (9.8 in)	220°	C	F, AI, AI-S	5,200 g (11.5 lb)	236×171 mm (9.3×6.7 in)	Built-in		
6 mm f/5.6	Feb 1970	f/5.6–22	9/6	fixed	220°	C	F	430 g (15 oz)	92×81 mm (3.6×3.2 in)	Built-in		requires MLU
7.5 mm f/5.6	Dec 1965	f/5.6–22	9/6	fixed	180°	C	F	350 g (12 oz)	82×82 mm (3.2×3.2 in)	Built-in		requires MLU
8 mm f/2.8	Feb 1970	f/2.8–22	10/8	0.3 m (12 in)	180°	C	F, AI, AI-S	1,100 g (2.4 lb)	123×140 mm (4.8×5.5 in)	Built-in		
8 mm f/8	Jul 1962	f/5.6–22	9/5	fixed	180°	C	F	300 g (11 oz)	82×80 mm (3.2×3.1 in)	Built-in		requires MLU
10 mm f/5.6 OP	Jul 1968	f/5.6–22	9/6	fixed	180°	C	F	400 g (14 oz)	84×105 mm (3.3×4.1 in)	Built-in		orthographic projection using aspheric lens; requires MLU
16 mm f/2.8	Jul 1979	f/2.8–22	8/5	0.3 m (12 in)	180°	F	AI, AI-S	330 g (12 oz)	63×66 mm (2.5×2.6 in)	Rear		
16 mm f/3.5	Feb 1973	f/3.5–22	8/5	0.3 m (12 in)	170°	F	F, K, AI	330 g (12 oz)	68×60.5 mm (2.68×2.38 in)	Built-in		

===== Wide-angle lenses =====
Nikkor manual-focus ultra wide-angle lenses
Lens	Intro	Ap.	Eles / Grps	Min. Focus	Angle of view	Mount types	Weight	Size (Dia. × Len.)	Filter Thread (mm)	Photo	Notes
13 mm f/5.6	Dec 1975	f/5.6–22	16/12	0.3 m (12 in)	118°	K, AI, AI-S	1,240 g (2.73 lb)	115×101 mm (4.5×4.0 in)	Rear		CRC
15 mm f/3.5	Aug 1978	f/3.5–22	16/12	0.3 m (12 in)	110°	AI, AI-S	630 g (22 oz)	90×94.5 mm (3.54×3.72 in)	Rear		CRC
15 mm f/5.6	Jun 1973	f/5.6–22	14/12	0.3 m (12 in)	110°	F, K, AI	645 g (22.8 oz)	92×88 mm (3.6×3.5 in)	Built-in		CRC
18 mm f/3.5	Dec 1981	f/3.5–22	11/10	0.25 m (9.8 in)	100°	AI-S	350 g (12 oz)	75×72.5 mm (2.95×2.85 in)	72		CRC
18 mm f/4	Nov 1974	f/4–22	13/9	0.3 m (12 in)	100°	K, AI	325 g (11.5 oz)	89×58.5 mm (3.50×2.30 in)	86 (Ser.IX)		
20 mm f/2.8	Oct 1984	f/2.8–22	12/9	0.25 m (9.8 in)	94°	AI-S	260 g (9.2 oz)	65×64 mm (2.6×2.5 in)	62		CRC
20 mm f/3.5	Dec 1977	f/3.5–22	13/9	0.3 m (12 in)	94°	AI, AI-S	235 g (8.3 oz)	63.5×50.5 mm (2.50×1.99 in)	52		
20 mm f/3.5 (UD)	Nov 1967	f/3.5–22	11/9	0.3 m (12 in)	94°	F	390 g (14 oz)	75×69.5 mm (2.95×2.74 in)	72		
20 mm f/4	Aug 1974	f/4–22	10/8	0.3 m (12 in)	94°	K, AI	210 g (7.4 oz)	63.5×47.5 mm (2.50×1.87 in)	52		
21 mm f/4	Oct 1959	f/4–16	8/4	0.9 m (35 in)	91°	F	210 g (7.4 oz)	60×59 mm (2.4×2.3 in)	52		Requires MLU

Nikkor manual-focus wide-angle lenses
Lens	Intro	Ap.	Eles / Grps	Min. Focus	Angle of view	Mount types	Weight	Size (Dia. × Len.)	Filter Thread (mm)	Photo	Notes
24 mm f/2.0	Oct 1977	f/2.0–22	11/10	0.3 m (12 in)	84°	AI, AI-S	300 g (11 oz)	63.5×63.5 mm (2.50×2.50 in)	52		CRC
24 mm f/2.8 (N)	Jun 1967	f/2.8–16	9/7	0.3 m (12 in)	84°	F, K	290 g (10 oz)	64.5×59.5 mm (2.54×2.34 in)	52		CRC
24 mm f/2.8	Jan 1977	f/2.8–22	9/9	0.3 m (12 in)	84°	AI, AI-S	270 g (9.5 oz)	63.5×58 mm (2.50×2.28 in)	52		CRC
28 mm f/2.0	Aug 1970	f/2.0–22	9/8	0.3 m (12 in)	74°	F, K, AI, AI-S	360 g (13 oz)	64.5×70.5 mm (2.54×2.78 in)	52		CRC
28 mm f/2.8	Oct 1977	f/2.8–22	7/7	0.3 m (12 in)	74°	K, AI	245 g (8.6 oz)	63.5×56.5 mm (2.50×2.22 in)	52		
28 mm f/2.8	Aug 1981	f/2.8–22	8/8	0.2 m (7.9 in)	74°	AI-S	250 g (8.8 oz)	63×53 mm (2.5×2.1 in)	52	Nikon 28mm f/2.8 manual-focus lens	CRC
28 mm f/3.5	Mar 1960	f/3.5–16	6/6	0.6 m (24 in)	74°	F	220 g (7.8 oz)	62.5×54 mm (2.46×2.13 in)	52		
28 mm f/3.5	Feb 1975	f/3.5–22	6/6	0.3 m (12 in)	74°	K, AI, AI-S	235 g (8.3 oz)	63.5×58.5 mm (2.50×2.30 in)	52		
35 mm f/1.4	May 1970	f/1.4–22	9/7	0.3 m (12 in)	62°	F, K	415 g (14.6 oz)	66.5×74.5 mm (2.62×2.93 in)	52		CRC
35 mm f/1.4	1977	f/1.4–16	9/7	0.3 m (12 in)	62°	AI, AI-S	400 g (14 oz)	67.5×74 mm (2.66×2.91 in)	52		CRC
35 mm f/2.0	Feb 1965	f/2.0–16	8/6	0.3 m (12 in)	62°	F	285 g (10.1 oz)	63.5×61 mm (2.50×2.40 in)	52		
35 mm f/2.0	Mar 1975	f/2.0–22	8/6	0.3 m (12 in)	62°	K, AI, AI-S	285 g (10.1 oz)	63.5×61 mm (2.50×2.40 in)	52		
35 mm f/2.8	Oct 1959	f/2.8–16	7/5	0.3 m (12 in)	62°	F	240 g (8.5 oz)	63.5×54 mm (2.50×2.13 in)	52		
35 mm f/2.8	Feb 1962	f/2.8–16	7/6	0.3 m (12 in)	62°	F	240 g (8.5 oz)	63.5×56.5 mm (2.50×2.22 in)	52		
35 mm f/2.8	Jun 1974	f/2.8–22	6/6	0.3 m (12 in)	62°	K, AI	240 g (8.5 oz)	63.5×56.5 mm (2.50×2.22 in)	52		
35 mm f/2.8	1979	f/2.8–22	5/5	0.3 m (12 in)	62°	AI, AI-S	240 g (8.5 oz)	63.5×56.5 mm (2.50×2.22 in)	52		

===== Normal lenses =====
Nikkor manual-focus normal lenses
Lens	Intro	Ap.	Eles / Grps	Min. Focus	Angle of view	Mount types	Weight	Size (Dia. × Len.)	Filter Thread (mm)	Photo	Notes
45 mm f/2.8 GN	Aug 1968	f/2.8–32	4/3	0.8 m (31 in)	50°	K	150 g (5.3 oz)	64×31 mm (2.5×1.2 in)	52		
45 mm f/2.8 P	Feb 2001	f/2.8–22	4/3	0.45 m (18 in)	50°	AI-P	120 g (4.2 oz)	61.5×17 mm (2.42×0.67 in)	52		
50 mm f/1.2	Mar 1978	f/1.2–16	7/6	0.6 m (24 in)	46°	AI, AI-S	340 g (12 oz)	70.5×59 mm (2.78×2.32 in)	52		
50 mm f/1.4	Mar 1962	f/1.4–16	7/5	0.6 m (24 in)	46°	F, K	325 g (11.5 oz)	67×56.5 mm (2.64×2.22 in)	52		
50 mm f/1.4	Jan 1976	f/1.4–16	7/6	0.45 m (18 in)	46°	K, AI, AI-S	260 g (9.2 oz)	64×51.5 mm (2.52×2.03 in)	52	Nikon 50mm f/1.4 manual-focus lens	
50 mm f/1.8	Jan 1978	f/1.8–22	6/5	0.45 m (18 in)	46°	AI, AI-S	220 g (7.8 oz)	63.5×48 mm (2.50×1.89 in)	52		
50 mm f/2.0 (S)	Apr 1959	f/2–16	7/5	0.6 m (24 in)	46°	F	120 g (4.2 oz)	61×47.5 mm (2.40×1.87 in)	52		
50 mm f/2.0 (H)	Jan 1964	f/2–16	6/4	0.6 m (24 in)	46°	F, K, AI	205 g (7.2 oz)	64.5×48 mm (2.54×1.89 in)	52		
55 mm f/1.2	Dec 1965	f/1.2–16	7/5	0.6 m (24 in)	43°	F, K, AI	420 g (15 oz)	73.5×58.5 mm (2.89×2.30 in)	52		
58 mm f/1.2 Noct	Feb 1977	f/1.2–16	7/6	0.5 m (20 in)	40°50'	AI, AI-S	480 g (17 oz)	74×63 mm (2.9×2.5 in)	52		
58 mm f/1.4	Oct 1959	f/1.4–16	7/6	0.6 m (24 in)	40°50'	F	350 g (12 oz)	67×57 mm (2.6×2.2 in)	52		

===== Telephoto lenses =====
Nikkor manual-focus portrait lenses
Lens	Intro	Ap.	Eles / Grps	Min. Focus	Angle of view	Mount types	Weight	Size (Dia. × Len.)	Filter Thread (mm)	Photo	Notes
85 mm f/1.4	Mar 1981	f/1.4–16	7/5	0.85 m (33 in)	28°30'	AI-S	620 g (22 oz)	80.5×72.5 mm (3.17×2.85 in)	72		CRC
85 mm f/1.8	Aug 1964	f/1.8–22	6/4	1.0 m (39 in)	28°30'	F, K	420 g (15 oz)	72×70 mm (2.8×2.8 in)	52		
85 mm f/2.0	Apr 1977	f/2.0–22	5/5	0.85 m (33 in)	28°30'	AI, AI-S	310 g (11 oz)	63.5×61 mm (2.50×2.40 in)	52	Nikon 85mm f/2 manual-focus lens	
105 mm f/1.8	Mar 1981	f/1.8–22	5/5	1 m (39 in)	23°20'	AI-S	580 g (20 oz)	78.5×88.5 mm (3.09×3.48 in)	62	AI Nikkor 105mm f/1.8S lens	
105 mm f/2.5 (P)	Apr 1959	f/2.5–22	5/3	1 m (39 in)	23°20'	F	370 g (13 oz)	66×74 mm (2.6×2.9 in)	52		
105 mm f/2.5	1971	f/2.5–32	5/4	1 m (39 in)	23°20'	F, K, AI, AI-S	435 g (15.3 oz)	66×78 mm (2.6×3.1 in)	52		
105 mm f/4 (T)	Jul 1960	f/4.0–32	3/3	0.8 m (31 in)	23°20'	F	250 g (8.8 oz)	54×88.5 mm (2.13×3.48 in)	34.5		
135 mm f/2	Dec 1975	f/2.0–22	6/4	1.3 m (4.3 ft)	18°	K, AI, AI-S	860 g (30 oz)	81×103 mm (3.2×4.1 in)	72		
135 mm f/2.8 (Q)	Dec 1965	f/2.8–22	4/4	1.5 m (4.9 ft)	18°	F, K	620 g (22 oz)	72.5×104 mm (2.85×4.09 in)	52		
135 mm f/2.8	Jan 1976	f/2.8–32	5/4	1.3 m (4.3 ft)	18°	K, AI, AI-S	430 g (15 oz)	64.5×91.5 mm (2.54×3.60 in)	52	Nikon 135mm f/2.8 manual-focus lens	
135 mm f/3.5 (Q)	Apr 1959	f/3.5–32	4/3	1.5 m (4.9 ft)	18°	F	460 g (16 oz)	66×93.5 mm (2.60×3.68 in)	52		
135 mm f/3.5	Jun 1969	f/3.5–32	4/4	1.3 m (4.3 ft)	18°	F, K, AI, AI-S	400 g (14 oz)	65×89.5 mm (2.56×3.52 in)	52		

Nikkor manual-focus telephoto lenses (refractor)
Lens	Intro	Ap.	Eles / Grps	Min. Focus	Angle of view	Mount types	Weight	Size (Dia. × Len.)	Filter Thread (mm)	Photo	Notes
180 mm f/2.8	Jun 1970	f/2.8–32	5/4	1.8 m (5.9 ft)	13°40'	F, K, AI	830 g (29 oz)	81×140.5 mm (3.19×5.53 in)	72		
180 mm f/2.8 ED	Mar 1981	f/2.8–32	5/5	1.8 m (5.9 ft)	13°40'	AI-S	880 g (31 oz)	78.5×138 mm (3.09×5.43 in)	72		
200 mm f/2 ED-IF	Jan 1977	f/2.0–22	10/8	2.5 m (8.2 ft)	12°20'	AI, AI-S	2,400 g (5.3 lb)	138×222 mm (5.4×8.7 in)	122		
200 mm f/4 (Q)	Jul 1961	f/4.0–32	4/4	2 m (6.6 ft)	12°20'	F	630 g (22 oz)	72.5×163 mm (2.85×6.42 in)	52		
200 mm f/4	Aug 1975	f/4.0–32	5/5	2 m (6.6 ft)	12°20'	K, AI, AI-S	540 g (19 oz)	68×126 mm (2.7×5.0 in)	52	Nikon 200mm f/4 manual-focus lens	
300 mm f/2 ED-IF	Jun 1983	f/2.0–16	11/8	4 m (13 ft)	8°10'	AI-S	7,500 g (16.5 lb)	183×330 mm (7.2×13.0 in)	(52)		
300 mm f/2.8 ED	Jan 1972	f/2.8–32	6/5	3.5 m (11 ft)	8°10'	F, K	3,000 g (6.6 lb)	?	122		
300 mm f/2.8 ED-IF	Nov 1977	f/2.8–22	8/6	3.5 m (11 ft)	8°10'	AI, AI-S	2,500 g (5.5 lb)	138×249 mm (5.4×9.8 in)	122 (39)		
300 mm f/4.5 (P)	Jul 1964	f/4.5–32	5/5?	4 m (13 ft)	8°10'	F	?	?	72		
300 mm f/4.5 (H)	Jan 1969	f/4.5–32	6/4	4 m (13 ft)	8°10'	F, K, AI, AI-S	1,100 g (2.4 lb)	80×203 mm (3.1×8.0 in)	72	AI Nikkor 300mm f/4.5S lens	
300 mm f/4.5 ED	Mar 1977	f/4.5–22	6/4	4 m (13 ft)	8°10'	K, AI	1,100 g (2.4 lb)	78.5×200 mm (3.09×7.87 in)	72		
300 mm f/4.5 ED-IF	Aug 1978	f/4.5–22	7/6	2.5 m (8.2 ft)	8°10'	AI, AI-S	990 g (35 oz)	80×200 mm (3.1×7.9 in)	72		

Nikkor manual-focus super telephoto lenses (refractor)
Lens	Intro	Ap.	Eles / Grps	Min. Focus	Angle of view	Mount types	Weight	Size (Dia. × Len.)	Filter Thread (mm)	Photo	Notes
400 mm f/2.8 ED-IF	Dec 1985	f/2.8–22	8/6	4 m (13 ft)	6°10'	AI-S	5,150 g (11.35 lb)	163×296 mm (6.4×11.7 in)	(52)		
400 mm f/3.5 ED-IF	Apr 1976	f/3.5–22	8/6	4 m (13 ft)	6°10'	K, AI, AI-S	2,800 g (6.2 lb)	134×304 mm (5.3×12.0 in)	122 (39)		
400 mm f/4.5	Aug 1964	f/4.5–22	4/4	5 m (16 ft)	6°10'	F	3,100 g (6.8 lb) (Note: With CU-1)	135×471.5 mm (5.31×18.56 in)	122 (52) (Note: With AU-1)		Requires CU-1 or AU-1 (Note: Two-part telephoto consists of optical lens "head" and focusing mount. As released in 1964, the original focusing mount (designated CU-1) weighs approximately 1,200 g (2.6 lb) by itself; a separate "cradle" improves the tripod mount. An updated focusing mount (designated AU-1) was released with the ED lens heads in 1975 and weighs 2,400 g (5.3 lb) by itself and eliminates the need for the cradle while adding a 52mm drop-in filter holder. Both the CU-1 and AU-1 include an aperture with automatic stop-down, but neither has a metering prong to couple with the in-body light meter. The AU-1 relocates focusing and aperture controls closer to the lens mount.)
400 mm f/5.6 (ED)	Feb 1973	f/5.6–32	5/3	5 m (16 ft)	6°10'	F, K, AI	1,400 g (3.1 lb)	84.5×263 mm (3.33×10.35 in)	72		
400 mm f/5.6 ED-IF	Aug 1978	f/5.6–32	7/6	4 m (13 ft)	6°10'	AI, AI-S	1,170 g (2.58 lb)	85×262 mm (3.3×10.3 in)	72		
500 mm f/4P ED-IF	Apr 1988	f/4.0–22	8/6	5 m (16 ft)	5°	AI-P	3,000 g (6.6 lb)	138×384 mm (5.4×15.1 in)	(39)		
600 mm f/4 ED-IF	Jun 1977	f/4.0–22	8/6	6.5 m (21 ft)	4°10'	AI, AI-S	6,300 g (13.9 lb)	177×460 mm (7.0×18.1 in)	(52)		
600 mm f/5.6	Aug 1964	f/5.6–22	5/4	11 m (36 ft)	4°10'	F	3,600 g (7.9 lb)	135×516.5 mm (5.31×20.33 in)	122 (52)		Requires CU-1 or AU-1
600 mm f/5.6 ED	Jul 1975	f/5.6–22	5/4	11 m (36 ft)	4°10'	K	4,700 g (10.4 lb)	133×515 mm (5.2×20.3 in)	122 (52)		Requires CU-1 or AU-1
600 mm f/5.6 ED-IF	May 1976	f/5.6–32	7/6	5.5 m (18 ft)	4°10'	K, AI, AI-S	2,700 g (6.0 lb)	134×382 mm (5.3×15.0 in)	122 (39)		
800 mm f/5.6 ED-IF	Sep 1986	f/5.6–32	8/6	8 m (26 ft)	3°	AI-S	5,400 g (11.9 lb)	163×546 mm (6.4×21.5 in)	(52)		
800 mm f/8	Aug 1964	f/8.0–22	5/5	19 m (62 ft)	3°	F	3,500 g (7.7 lb)	135×711.5 mm (5.31×28.01 in)	122 (52)		Requires CU-1 or AU-1
800 mm f/8 ED	Jul 1975	f/8.0–22	5/5	19 m (62 ft)	3°	K	5,300 g (11.7 lb)	133×693 mm (5.2×27.3 in)	122 (52)		Requires CU-1 or AU-1
800 mm f/8 ED-IF	Dec 1978	f/8–32	9/7	10 m (33 ft)	3°	AI, AI-S	3,800 g (8.4 lb)	134×460 mm (5.3×18.1 in)	122 (39)		
1200 mm f/11	Aug 1964	f/11–64	5/4	43 m (141 ft)	2°	F	4,300 g (9.5 lb)	135×922 mm (5.3×36.3 in)	122 (52)		Requires CU-1 or AU-1
1200 mm f/11 ED	Jul 1975	f/11–64	5/4	43 m (141 ft)	2°	K	6,100 g (13.4 lb)	133×898 mm (5.2×35.4 in)	122 (52)		Requires CU-1 or AU-1
1200 mm f/11 ED-IF	Dec 1979	f/11–32	9/8	14 m (46 ft)	2°	AI, AI-S	3,900 g (8.6 lb)	134×577 mm (5.3×22.7 in)	122 (39)		

Reflex-Nikkor manual-focus catadioptric lenses
Lens	Intro	Ap.	Eles / Grps	Min. Focus	Angle of view	Mount types	Weight	Size (Dia. × Len.)	Filter Thread (mm)	Photo	Notes
500 mm f/5	May 1961	f/5 (fixed)	5/4	15 m (49 ft)	5°	F	1.7 kg (3.7 lb)	125×200 mm (4.9×7.9 in)	39 (rear)		
500 mm f/8	Dec 1968	f/8 (fixed)	5/3	4 m (13 ft)	5°	F	1 kg (2.2 lb)	93×141.5 mm (3.66×5.57 in)	39 (rear)	500mm f/8 reflex lens	
500 mm f/8	Apr 1984	f/8 (fixed)	6/6	1.5 m (4.9 ft)	5°	K	840 g (1.85 lb)	89×118 mm (3.5×4.6 in)	39 (rear)		
1000 mm f/6.3	Jun 1959	f/6.3 (fixed)	3/2	30 m (98 ft)	2°30'	F	9.9 kg (22 lb)	232×485 mm (9.1×19.1 in)	built-in (52)		
1000 mm f/11	Oct 1966	f/11 (fixed)	5/5	8 m (26 ft)	2°30'	F, K	1.9 kg (4.2 lb)	117×238 mm (4.6×9.4 in)	built-in		
2000 mm f/11	Nov 1971	f/11 (fixed)	5/5	18 m (59 ft)	1°10'	F	17.5 kg (39 lb)	262×598 mm (10.3×23.5 in)	built-in		With mounting yoke, 563 mm (22.2 in) high and 330 mm (13 in) wide.

==== Micro and Medical ====
These lenses are capable of focusing to close distances, usually resulting in a reproduction ratio of half-size (1:2) with the lens alone; in most cases, full-size (1:1) or greater magnification can be achieved using appropriate accessories, including extension tubes, close-up lenses, or bellows. Special-purpose lenses intended for magnification greater than 1:1 are designated Macro-Nikkor to distinguish them from the Micro-Nikkor line, which are suitable for general use.

Micro-Nikkor and Medical-Nikkor manual-focus macro lenses
Lens	Intro	Ap.	Eles / Grps	Min. Focus [Mag]	Angle of view	Mount types	Weight	Size (Dia. × Len.)	Filter Thread (mm)	Photo	Notes
PC-E 45 mm f/2.8D ED	Jul 2008	f/2.8–32	9/8	0.25 m (9.8 in)	51°	AI-P(D)	740 g (26 oz)	82.5×112 mm (3.25×4.41 in)	77	PC-E Micro-Nikkor 45mm f/2.8 ED lens	PC, CRC
55 mm f/2.8	Dec 1979	f/2.8–32	6/5	0.25 m (9.8 in) [0.5×]	43°	AI-S	290 g (10 oz)	63.5×70 mm (2.50×2.76 in)	52	Micro-Nikkor 55mm f/2.8 (AI-S version)	CRC
55 mm f/3.5	Aug 1961	f/3.5–32	5/4	0.24 m (9.4 in) [0.5×]	43°	F, K, AI	245 g (8.6 oz)	65.5×64.5 mm (2.58×2.54 in)	52	"K" style Micro-Nikkor 55mm f/3.5 lens; this lens has been modified to add an AI aperture selection ring	(Note: The earliest (pre-AI) versions were equipped with a preset (not automatic) diaphragm. Later (still pre-AI) versions were updated to a compensating automatic aperture, in which the diaphragm setting would open up as the lens is focused closer. The last versions removed this "compensating diaphragm" feature, and require metering adjustments based on focusing distance.)
UV 55 mm f/4	May 1975	f/4.0–32	3/3	0.36 m (14 in)	43°	F	230 g (8.1 oz)	66×65.7 mm (2.60×2.59 in)	52		
PC 85 mm f/2.8D	Jun 1999	f/2.8–45	6/5	0.39 m (15 in)	28°30'	AI-P(D)	775 g (27.3 oz)	83.5×118 mm (3.29×4.65 in)	77		PC, CRC
PC-E 85 mm f/2.8D	Jul 2008	f/2.8–32	6/5	0.39 m (15 in)	28°30'	AI-P(D)	635 g (22.4 oz)	83.5×107 mm (3.29×4.21 in)	77		PC, CRC
105 mm f/2.8	Mar 1983	f/2.8–32	10/9	0.41 m (16 in) [0.5×]	23°20'	AI-S	515 g (18.2 oz)	66.5×83.5 mm (2.62×3.29 in)	52		
105 mm f/4 (Bellows)	Jan 1970	f/4.0–32	5/3	—N/a (via bellows) [1.3×]	23°20'	F	230 g (8.1 oz)	64×56.5 mm (2.52×2.22 in)	52		
105 mm f/4	May 1975	f/4.0–32	5/3	0.47 m (19 in) [0.5×]	23°20'	K, AI, AI-S	500 g (18 oz)	74.5×104 mm (2.93×4.09 in)	52	Micro-Nikkor 105mm f/4 lens	
UV 105 mm f/4.5	May 1975	f/4.5–32	6/5	0.47 m (19 in) [0.5×]	23°20'	?	?	?	52		
Medical 120 mm f/4IF	Dec 1981	f/4.0–32	9/6 (+2/1)	0.35 m (14 in) [2×]	18°50'	K	890 g (31 oz)	98×150 mm (3.9×5.9 in)	49		(Note: The 120mm f/4 Medical–Nikkor is capable of reproduction ratios from 1/11–1×; a supplemental doublet which threads into the front and is provided with the lens, allows reproduction ratios of 0.8–2×.)
135 mm f/4 (Bellows)	Jun 1959	f/4.0–22	4/3	—N/a (via bellows) [1.1×]	18°	F	330 g (11.5 oz)	?	43		
200 mm f/4 IF	Aug 1978	f/4.0–32	9/6	0.71 m (28 in) [0.5×]	12°20'	AI, AI-S	880 g (31 oz)	66×180 mm (2.6×7.1 in)	52		
Medical 200 mm f/5.6	May 1962	f/5.6–45	4/4+	3.35 m (11.0 ft) (fixed) [3×]	12°20'	F, K	670 g (24 oz)	80×176 mm (3.1×6.9 in)	38	Nikon D700 with Medical-Nikkor 200mm f/5.6 lens	(Note: Six supplemental lenses are provided with the 200mm f/5.6 Medical-Nikkor, which are labeled as 1/8×, 1/6×, 1/4×, 1/2×, 1×, and 2×. These can be used singly or in pairs to change reproduction ratio & focus distance. Without any lenses, the native reproduction ratio is 1:15. When stacking pairs, the weaker lens is mounted first, closer to the front of the parent lens: 1/3× by stacking 1/6× and 1/4× lenses; 2/3× by stacking 1/4× and 1/2× lenses; 3/2× by stacking 1/2× and 1× lenses; 3× by stacking 1× and 2× lenses)

==== Manual-focus zoom lenses ====
Zoom-Nikkor manual-focus wide-angle zoom lenses
Lens	Intro	Ap.	Eles / Grps	Min. Focus	Angle of view	Mount types	Weight	Size (Dia. × Len.)	Filter Thread (mm)	Photo	Notes
25–50 mm f/4	Apr 1979	f/4.0–22	11/10	0.6 m (24 in)	80°40' ~ 40°40'	AI, AI-S	600 g (21 oz)	75×112 mm (3.0×4.4 in)	72		
28–45 mm f/4.5	Sep 1975	f/4.5–22	11/7	0.6 m (24 in)	74° ~ 50°	K, AI	440 g (16 oz)	75×91 mm (3.0×3.6 in)	52		
28–50 mm f/3.5	Jan 1984	f/3.5–22	9/9	0.6 m (24 in) (0.32 m (13 in) at 50mm)	74° ~ 46°	AI-S	395 g (13.9 oz)	68.5×75 mm (2.70×2.95 in)	52		

Zoom-Nikkor manual-focus standard zoom lenses
Lens	Intro	Ap.	Eles / Grps	Min. Focus	Angle of view	Mount types	Weight	Size (Dia. × Len.)	Filter Thread (mm)	Photo	Notes
28–85 mm f/3.5–4.5	Dec 1985	f/3.5~4.5–22	15/11	0.8 m (31 in) (0.23 m (9.1 in) at 28mm)	74° ~ 28°30'	AI-S	510 g (18 oz)	67×89 mm (2.6×3.5 in)	62		
35–70 mm f/3.3–4.5	Oct 1984	f/3.3~4.5–22	8/7	0.5 m (20 in)	62° ~ 34°20'	AI-S	255 g (9.0 oz)	63×61 mm (2.5×2.4 in)	52		
35–70 mm f/3.5	Sep 1977	f/3.5–22	10/9	1 m (39 in)	62° ~ 34°20'	AI	540 g (19 oz)	75×101 mm (3.0×4.0 in)	72		
35–70 mm f/3.5	Sep 1981	f/3.5–22	10/9	1 m (39 in) (0.35 m (14 in) at 70mm)	62° ~ 34°20'	AI-S	520 g (18 oz)	66.5×105 mm (2.62×4.13 in)	62		
35–70 mm f/3.5–4.8	1995	f/3.5~4.8–22	8/7	0.4 m (16 in)	62° ~ 34°20'	AI-S	200 g (7.1 oz)	63×64 mm (2.5×2.5 in)	52		
35–85 mm f/2.8–4	?	f/2.8~4.0–16	13/8	1.1 m (43 in)	62° ~ 28°30'	F	1,100 g (39 oz)	90×95 mm (3.5×3.7 in)	82		
35–105 mm f/3.5–4.5	Jan 1983	f/3.5~4.5–22	16/12	1.4 m (55 in) (0.27 m (11 in) at 35mm)	62° ~ 23°20'	AI-S	510 g (18 oz)	64×86.5 mm (2.52×3.41 in)	52	Nikon 35-105mm micro push-pull zoom lens, manual-focus	
35–135 mm f/3.5–4.5	Oct 1984	f/3.5~4.5–22	15/14	1.5 m (59 in) (0.4 m (16 in) at 135mm)	62° ~ 18°	AI-S	600 g (21 oz)	68×104 mm (2.7×4.1 in)	62		
35–200 mm f/3.5–4.5	Dec 1985	f/3.5~4.5–22	17/13	1.6 m (63 in) (0.3 m (12 in) at 35mm)	62° ~ 12°20'	AI-S	740 g (26 oz)	70×139 mm (2.8×5.5 in)	62		
43–86 mm f/3.5	Feb 1963	f/3.5–22	9/7	1.2 m (3.9 ft)	53° ~ 28°30'	F, K, AI	450 g (16 oz)	66.5×81.5 mm (2.62×3.21 in)	52		

Zoom-Nikkor manual-focus telephoto zoom lenses
Lens	Intro	Ap.	Eles / Grps	Min. Focus	Angle of view	Mount types	Weight	Size (Dia. × Len.)	Filter Thread (mm)	Photo	Notes
50–135 mm f/3.5	Apr 1982	f/3.5–22	16/13	1.3 m (51 in)	46° ~ 18°	AI-S	700 g (25 oz)	73×142 mm (2.9×5.6 in)	62		
50–300 mm f/4.5	1967	f/4.5–22	20/13	2.5 m (8.2 ft)	46° ~ 8°10'	F, K, AI	2,300 g (5.1 lb)	98×292 mm (3.9×11.5 in)	95		
50–300 mm f/4.5 ED	Jun 1977	f/4.5–32	15/11	2.5 m (8.2 ft)	46° ~ 8°10'	AI, AI-S	2,200 g (4.9 lb)	98×247 mm (3.9×9.7 in)	95		
70-210 mm f/4.5–5.6	1995	f/4.5~5.6–22	10/7	1.5 m (4.9 ft)	34° ~ 11°	AI-S	375 g (0.827 lb)	64×104 mm (2.5×4.1 in)	52		
80-200 mm f/2.8 ED	Aug 1982	f/2.8–32	15/11	2.5 m (8.2 ft)	30°10' ~ 12°20'	AI-S	1,700 g (3.7 lb)	?	95		(Note: Prototype version of the 80-200/2.8ED featured two-ring control with a filter size of 86mm and nominal diameter and length of 91.5×204 mm (3.60×8.03 in).)
80-200 mm f/4	Jul 1977	f/4.0–32	13/9	1.2 m (3.9 ft)	30°10' ~ 12°20'	AI	810 g (29 oz)	73×162 mm (2.9×6.4 in)	62	Nikon 80-200mm f/4 push-pull zoom lens	
80-200 mm f/4.5	Dec 1969	f/4.5–32	15/10	1.8 m (5.9 ft)	30°10' ~ 12°20'	K, AI	880 g (31 oz)	74.5×162 mm (2.93×6.38 in)	52		
80-200 mm f/4.5	Jul 1977	f/4.5–32	13/9	1.8 m (5.9 ft)	30°10' ~ 12°20'	AI	750 g (26 oz)	73×162 mm (2.9×6.4 in)	52		
85–250 mm f/4	Apr 1969	f/4.0–16	20/13	4 m (13 ft)	28°30' ~ 10°	F	?	?	Ser.IX		
85–250 mm f/4–4.5	Nov 1959	f/4.0~4.5–16	15/8	4 m (13 ft)	28°30' ~ 10°	F	1,800 g (4.0 lb)	?	Ser.IX		
100–300 mm f/5.6	Jan 1984	f/5.6–32	14/10	2 m (6.6 ft)	24°20' ~ 8°10'	AI-S	930 g (33 oz)	74×207 mm (2.9×8.1 in)	62		
180–600 mm f/8 ED	Feb 1976	f/8.0–32	18/11	2.5 m (8.2 ft)	13°40' ~ 4°10'	K, AI, AI-S	3,400 g (7.5 lb)	105×403 mm (4.1×15.9 in)	95		
200–400 mm f/4 ED	Jun 1983	f/4.0–32	15/10	4 m (13 ft)	12°20' ~ 6°10'	AI-S	3,650 g (8.05 lb)	144×338 mm (5.7×13.3 in)	122		
200–600 mm f/9.5	Apr 1971	f/9.5–32	19/12	4 m (13 ft)	12°20' ~ 4°10'	F, K, AI, AI-S	2,300 g (5.1 lb)	89×382 mm (3.5×15.0 in)	Ser.IX		
200–600 mm f/9.5–10.5	Oct 1961	f/9.5~10.5–32	13/12	4 m (13 ft)	12°20' ~ 4°10'	F	2,300 g (5.1 lb)	?	Ser.IX		
360–1200 mm f/11 ED	1977	f/11–32	20/13	6 m (20 ft)	6°50' ~ 2°	K, AI, AI-S	7,100 g (15.7 lb)	125×704 mm (4.9×27.7 in)	122		
1200–1700 mm f/5.6–8P ED-IF	Feb 1990	f/5.6~8.0–22	18/13	10 m (33 ft)	2° ~ 1°30'	AI-P	16,000 g (35 lb)	237×880 mm (9.3×34.6 in)	(52)		

==== Series E lenses ====
Series E lenses were introduced with the Nikon EM in 1979 and featured lighter construction to complement the smaller, simplified camera body.

Series E manual-focus lenses
Lens	Intro	Ap.	Eles / Grps	Min. Focus	Angle of view	Mount types	Weight	Size (Dia. × Len.)	Filter Thread (mm)	Photo	Notes
28 mm f/2.8	Nov 1979	f/2.8–22	5/5	0.3 m (12 in)	74°	AI-S	155 g (5.5 oz)	62.5×44.5 mm (2.46×1.75 in)	52		
35 mm f/2.5	Mar 1979	f/2.5–22	5/5	0.3 m (12 in)	62°	AI-S	150 g (5.3 oz)	62.5×44.5 mm (2.46×1.75 in)	52		
50 mm f/1.8	Mar 1979	f/1.8–22	6/5	0.6 m (24 in)	46°	AI-S	135 g (4.8 oz)	62.5×33 mm (2.46×1.30 in)	52	Nikon Series E 50mm .mw-parser-output span.fnumber,.mw-parser-output .fnumber-fallback{display:inline-block;white-space:nowrap;width:max-content}.mw-parser-output span.fnumber::first-letter,.mw-parser-output .fnumber-fallback .first-letter{font-style:italic;font-family:Trebuchet MS,Candara,Georgia,Calibri,Corbel,serif}.mw-parser-output span.fnumber.noitalic::first-letter,.mw-parser-output .fnumber-fallback.noitalic .first-letter{font-style:normal;font-family:inherit}f/1.8 lens	
100 mm f/2.8	Mar 1979	f/2.8–22	4/4	1 m (39 in)	24°20'	AI-S	215 g (7.6 oz)	62.5×57.5 mm (2.46×2.26 in)	52		
135 mm f/2.8	Mar 1981	f/2.8–32	4/4	1 m (39 in)	18°	AI-S	395 g (13.9 oz)	62.5×88.5 mm (2.46×3.48 in)	52		
36–72 mm f/3.5	Oct 1981	f/3.5–22	8/8	1.2 m (47 in)	62°–33°30'	AI-S	380 g (13 oz)	67×71.5 mm (2.64×2.81 in)	52		
70–210 mm f/4.0	Dec 1981	f/4.0–32	13/9	1.5 m (59 in) 0.56 m (22 in) (Macro, 70 mm)	34°20'–11°50'	AI-S	730 g (26 oz)	72.5×156 mm (2.85×6.14 in)	62		
75–150 mm f/3.5	May 1980	f/3.5–22	12/9	1.2 m (47 in)	31°40'–17°	AI-S	520 g (18 oz)	65×125 mm (2.6×4.9 in)	52		

==== Perspective control (PC) lenses ====
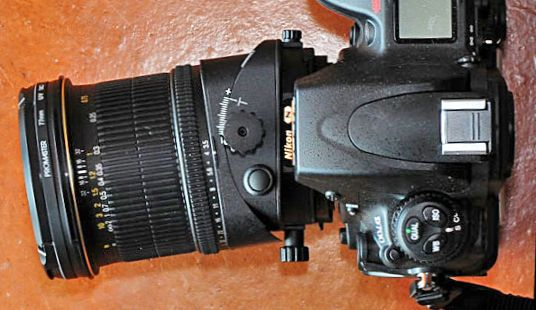
The PC-E Nikkor 24mm f/3.5D ED Lens of 2008 adds the tilt function to Nikkor's traditional shift function

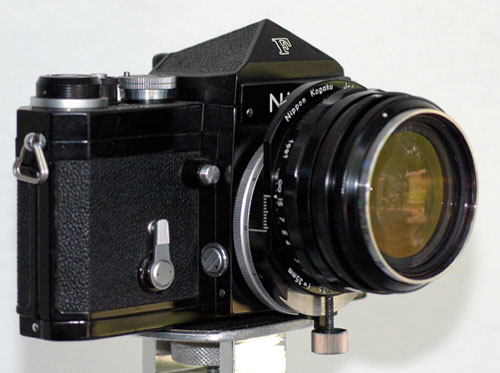
The 35mm f/3.5 PC-Nikkor, introduced in 1961. Note the small clearance between the shifting section of the lens and the camera body. The lens cannot be mounted on later camera bodies with protruding prisms.

Nikon PC lenses, like other perspective control lenses, offer adjustments that duplicate certain view camera movements. The 28mm and 35mm PC lenses support shifting the lens in relation to the film or sensor plane, while Nikon's 19mm, 24mm, 45mm, and 85mm PC-E lenses also support tilting.

Nikon currently offers four different PC lenses for sale: the four PC-E Nikkors (2008 and 2016), and the 85mm PC-Nikkor (1999). The 45 mm and 85 mm "Micro" lenses offer close focus (0.5 magnification) for macrophotography. The PC-E lenses (the "E" designates an electromagnetic diaphragm) offer automatic aperture control with all DSLRs with CMOS image sensor except the Nikon D90. With earlier DSLRs and all "analog" film camera models, a PC-E lens operates like a PC lens. The PC Micro-Nikkor 85 mm f/2.8D lens offers only preset aperture control, actuated mechanically by pressing a plunger.

===== History =====
In July 1962, Nikon released the first interchangeable perspective-control lens available for a single-lens reflex camera, the 35mm f/3.5 PC-Nikkor. This was followed in 1968 by a redesigned 35mm f/2.8 PC-Nikkor in which the shifting portion of the lens was further from the camera's body, in order to clear the new "Photomic" meters. The last optical redesign of this 35mm lens was released in 1980.

The 35mm PC-Nikkor did not meet the need of photographers for a wider-angle lens, so in July 1975 Nikon released the 28mm f/4 PC-Nikkor. In February 1981 Nikon released an improved version of this lens, the 28mm f/3.5 PC-Nikkor, with a new optical design. This was the last of the completely manual PC-Nikkors to be offered.

===== Specifications =====
PC-Nikkor perspective control lenses
Name	Intro	Aperture Range	Ele./ Grp	Closest Focus	Stop-Down	Rotation / Click Stops	Max. Shift/Tilt	Shift Knob	Weight	Size (Dia. × Len.)	Filter Thread (mm)	Photo	Notes
19mm f/4E ED	Oct 2016	f/4–32	17/13	0.25 m (9.8 in)	electronic	90° R/L / 30°	12mm/7.5°	metal	885 g (31.2 oz)	89×124 mm (3.5×4.9 in)	n/a		
24mm f/3.5E	Jan 2008	f/3.5–32	13/10	0.21 m (8.3 in)	electronic	90° R/L / 30°	11.5mm/8.5°	metal	730 g (26 oz)	82.5×108 mm (3.25×4.25 in)	77mm		
28mm f/4	Jul 1975	f/4–22	10/8	0.3 m (12 in)	manual	360°/30°	11mm/none	metal	410 g (14 oz)	78×68 mm (3.1×2.7 in)	72mm		
28mm f/3.5	Feb 1981	f/3.5–22	9/8	0.3 m (12 in)	manual	360°/30°	11mm/none	metal	380 g (13 oz)	78×64.5 mm (3.07×2.54 in) (Note: 64.5 mm (2.54 in) extension from lens flange; 69 mm (2.7 in) long, overall)	72mm		
35mm f/3.5	Jul 1962	f/3.5–32	6/6	0.3 m (12 in)	manual	360°/30°	11mm/none	metal	290 g (10 oz)	70×52 mm (2.8×2.0 in)	52mm		
35mm f/2.8	May 1968 (Note: Cosmetic upgrade released in April 1976.)	f/2.8–32	8/7	0.3 m (12 in)	manual	360°/30°	11mm/none	metal	335 g (11.8 oz)	70×66.5 mm (2.76×2.62 in)	52mm		
35mm f/2.8	Jun 1980	f/2.8–32	7/7	0.3 m (12 in)	manual	360°/30°	11mm/none	plastic	320 g (11 oz)	62×61.5 mm (2.44×2.42 in) (Note: 61.5 mm (2.42 in) extension from lens flange; 66 mm (2.6 in) long, overall)	52mm		
45 mm f/2.8E ED	Jul 2008	f/2.8–32	9/8	0.253 m (10.0 in)	Electronic	90° R/L / 30°	11.5mm/8.5°	metal	740 g (26 oz)	82.5×112 mm (3.25×4.41 in)	77mm		
85 mm f/2.8D	Sep 1999	f/2.8–45	6/5	0.39 m (15 in)	Manual	90° R/L / 30°	12.4mm/8.3°		775 g (27.3 oz)	83.5×109.5 mm (3.29×4.31 in)	77mm		
85 mm f/2.8E	Jul 2008	f/2.8–32	6/5	0.39 m (15 in)	Electronic	90° R/L / 30°	11.5mm/8.5°		635 g (22.4 oz)	83.5×107 mm (3.29×4.21 in)	77mm		

=== Automatic focus lenses ===
==== AF prime lenses ====
===== FX format primes =====
====== Wide-angle ======
Nikkor auto-focus FX format ultra wide-angle lenses
Lens	Intro	Ap.	Eles / Grps	Min. Focus	Angle	Mount types	Weight	Size (Dia. × Len.)	Filter Thread (mm)	Photo	Notes
14 mm f/2.8D ED AF	Jul 2000	f/2.8–22	14/12	0.2 m (7.9 in)	114°	AF-D	670 g (24 oz)	87×86.5 mm (3.4×3.4 in)	rear (gel)		
16 mm f/2.8D AF Fisheye	Sep 1993	f/2.8–22	8/5	0.25 m (9.8 in)	180°	AF-D	290 g (10 oz)	63×57 mm (2.5×2.2 in)	rear (bayonet)		
18 mm f/2.8D AF	Apr 1994	f/2.8–22	13/10	0.25 m (9.8 in)	100°	AF-D	380 g (13 oz)	82×58 mm (3.2×2.3 in)	77		
20 mm f/1.8G ED AF-S N	Sep 2014	f/1.8–16	13/11	0.2 m (7.9 in)	90°	AF-G	355 g (12.5 oz)	82.5×80.5 mm (3.2×3.2 in)	77		
20 mm f/2.8D AF	Feb 1989	f/2.8–22	12/9	0.25 m (9.8 in)	90°	AF, AF-D	270 g (9.5 oz)	69×42.5 mm (2.7×1.7 in)	62		D released Mar 1994.

Nikkor auto-focus FX format wide-angle lenses
Lens	Intro	Ap.	Eles / Grps	Min. Focus	Angle	Mount types	Weight	Size (Dia. × Len.)	Filter Thread (mm)	Photo	Notes
24 mm f/1.4G ED AF-S N	Jan 2010	f/1.4–16	12/10	0.25 m (9.8 in)	84°	AF-G	620 g (22 oz)	83×88.5 mm (3.3×3.5 in)	77		
24 mm f/1.8G ED AF-S N	Aug 2015	f/1.8–16	12/9	0.23 m (9.1 in)	84°	AF-G	355 g (12.5 oz)	77.5×83.0 mm (3.1×3.3 in)	72		
24 mm f/2.8D AF	Sep 1986	f/2.8–22	9/9	0.3 m (1 ft 0 in)	84°	AF, AF-D	270 g (9.5 oz)	64.5×46 mm (2.5×1.8 in)	52		D released Apr 1994.
28 mm f/1.4D AF Aspherical	Sep 1993	f/1.4–22	11/8	0.35 m (1 ft 2 in)	75°	AF-D	520 g (18 oz)	75×77.5 mm (3.0×3.1 in)	72		
28 mm f/1.4E ED N	May 2017	f/1.4–16	14/11	0.28 m (11 in)	75°	AF-G	645 g (22.8 oz)	83.0×100.5 mm (3.3×4.0 in)	77		
28 mm f/1.8G AF-S N	Apr 2012	f/1.8–16	11/9	0.25 m (9.8 in)	75°	AF-G	330 g (12 oz)	73×80.5 mm (2.9×3.2 in)	67		
28 mm f/2.8D AF	Sep 1986	f/2.8–22	6/6	0.25 m (9.8 in)	74°	AF, AF-D	205 g (7.2 oz)	65×44.5 mm (2.6×1.8 in)	52		D released Oct 1994.
35 mm f/1.4G AF-S N	Sep 2010	f/1.4–16	10/7	0.3 m (1 ft 0 in)	63°	AF-G	600 g (21 oz)	83×89.5 mm (3.3×3.5 in)	67		
35 mm f/1.8G AF-S N	Jan 2014	f/1.8–16	11/8	0.25 m (9.8 in)	63°	AF-G	305 g (10.8 oz)	72.0×71.5 mm (2.8×2.8 in)	58		
35 mm f/2.0D AF	Mar 1989	f/2.0–22	6/5	0.25 m (9.8 in)	62°	AF, AF-D	205 g (7.2 oz)	64.5×43.5 mm (2.5×1.7 in)	52		D released Mar 1995

====== Mid-range ======
Nikkor auto-focus FX format normal lenses
Lens	Intro	Ap.	Eles / Grps	Min. Focus	Angle	Mount types	Weight	Size (Dia. × Len.)	Filter Thread (mm)	Photo	Notes
50 mm f/1.4D AF	Sep 1986	f/1.4–16	7/6	0.45 m (1 ft 6 in)	46°	AF, AF-D	230 g (8.1 oz)	64.5×42.5 mm (2.5×1.7 in)	52	Nikkor 50 mm .mw-parser-output span.fnumber,.mw-parser-output .fnumber-fallback{display:inline-block;white-space:nowrap;width:max-content}.mw-parser-output span.fnumber::first-letter,.mw-parser-output .fnumber-fallback .first-letter{font-style:italic;font-family:Trebuchet MS,Candara,Georgia,Calibri,Corbel,serif}.mw-parser-output span.fnumber.noitalic::first-letter,.mw-parser-output .fnumber-fallback.noitalic .first-letter{font-style:normal;font-family:inherit}f/1.4 AF lens	Revised in 1991; D released Apr 1995.
50 mm f/1.4G AF-S	Sep 2008	f/1.4–16	8/7	0.45 m (1 ft 6 in)	46°	AF-G	280 g (9.9 oz)	73.5×54 mm (2.9×2.1 in)	58	Nikkor 50 mm .mw-parser-output span.fnumber,.mw-parser-output .fnumber-fallback{display:inline-block;white-space:nowrap;width:max-content}.mw-parser-output span.fnumber::first-letter,.mw-parser-output .fnumber-fallback .first-letter{font-style:italic;font-family:Trebuchet MS,Candara,Georgia,Calibri,Corbel,serif}.mw-parser-output span.fnumber.noitalic::first-letter,.mw-parser-output .fnumber-fallback.noitalic .first-letter{font-style:normal;font-family:inherit}f/1.4G AF-S lens	
50 mm f/1.8D AF	Sep 1986	f/1.8–22	6/5	0.45 m (1 ft 6 in)	46°	AF, AF-D	155 g (5.5 oz)	63.5×39 mm (2.5×1.5 in)	52		Revised in 1990; D released Feb 2002.
50 mm f/1.8G AF-S	Apr 2011	f/1.8–16	7/6	0.45 m (1 ft 6 in)	47°	AF-G	185 g (6.5 oz)	72×52.5 mm (2.8×2.1 in)	58		Also available as "Special Edition" (Nov 2013) to match Df
58 mm f/1.4G AF-S	Oct 2013	f/1.4–16	9/6	0.58 m (1 ft 11 in)	40°50'	AF-G	385 g (13.6 oz)	85×70 mm (3.3×2.8 in)	72		

====== Telephoto ======
Nikkor auto-focus FX format portrait lenses
Lens	Intro	Ap.	Eles / Grps	Min. Focus	Angle	Mount types	Weight	Size (Dia. × Len.)	Filter Thread (mm)	Photo	Notes
80 mm f/2.8 AF	Apr 1983	f/2.8–22	6/4	1.0 m (3 ft 3 in)	30°20'	AF	390 g (14 oz)	69×78 mm (2.7×3.1 in)	52		(F3AF)
85 mm f/1.4D AF	Nov 1995	f/1.4–16	9/8	0.85 m (2 ft 9 in)	28°30'	AF-D	550 g (19 oz)	80×72.5 mm (3.1×2.9 in)	77		
85 mm f/1.4G AF-S N	Aug 2010	f/1.4–16	10/9	0.85 m (2 ft 9 in)	28°30'	AF-G	595 g (21.0 oz)	86.5×84 mm (3.4×3.3 in)	77		
85 mm f/1.8D AF	Nov 1988	f/1.8–16	6/6	0.85 m (2 ft 9 in)	28°30'	AF, AF-D	380 g (13 oz)	71.5×58.5 mm (2.8×2.3 in)	62		D released Mar 1994
85 mm f/1.8G AF-S	Jan 2012	f/1.8–16	9/9	0.8 m (2 ft 7 in)	28°30'	AF-G	350 g (12 oz)	80×73 mm (3.1×2.9 in)	67	Nikon Nikkor 85 mm .mw-parser-output span.fnumber,.mw-parser-output .fnumber-fallback{display:inline-block;white-space:nowrap;width:max-content}.mw-parser-output span.fnumber::first-letter,.mw-parser-output .fnumber-fallback .first-letter{font-style:italic;font-family:Trebuchet MS,Candara,Georgia,Calibri,Corbel,serif}.mw-parser-output span.fnumber.noitalic::first-letter,.mw-parser-output .fnumber-fallback.noitalic .first-letter{font-style:normal;font-family:inherit}f/1.8G AF-S lens	
105 mm f/1.4E AF-S ED	Jul 2016	f/1.4–16	14/9	1.0 m (3 ft 3 in)	23°10'	AF-G	985 g (34.7 oz)	94.5×106 mm (3.7×4.2 in)	82		
105 mm f/2D AF DC	Sep 1993	f/2.0–16	6/6	0.9 m (2 ft 11 in)	23°10'	AF-D	640 g (23 oz)	79×111 mm (3.1×4.4 in)	72		Defocus Control
135 mm f/2D AF DC	Oct 1990	f/2.0–16	7/6	1.1 m (3 ft 7 in)	18°	AF, AF-D	815 g (28.7 oz)	79×120 mm (3.1×4.7 in)	72		Defocus Control; D released Nov 1995

Nikkor auto-focus FX format telephoto lenses
Lens	Intro	Ap.	Eles / Grps	Min. Focus	Angle	Mount types	Weight	Size (Dia. × Len.)	Filter Thread (mm)	Photo	Notes
180 mm f/2.8D ED-IF AF	Sep 1986	f/2.8–22	8/6	1.5 m (4 ft 11 in)	13°40'	AF, AF-D	760 g (27 oz)	78.5×144 mm (3.1×5.7 in)	72		Updated Nov 1987; D released Dec 1994.
200 mm f/2G ED VR AF-S (II)	Jun 2004	f/2.0–22	13/9	1.9 m (6 ft 3 in)	12°20'	AF-G	2,930 g (6.46 lb)	124×203.5 mm (4.9×8.0 in)	(52)		II released Sep 2010.
200 mm f/3.5 AF	Apr 1983	f/3.5–32	8/6	2.0 m (6 ft 7 in)	12°20'	AF	868 g (30.6 oz)	80×157 mm (3.1×6.2 in)	62		(F3AF)
300 mm f/2.8 ED-IF AF	Nov 1986	f/2.8–22	8/6	3.0 m (9.8 ft)	8°10'	AF	2,700 g (6.0 lb)	133×255 mm (5.2×10.0 in)	(39)		Revised 1988.
300 mm f/2.8D ED-IF AF-I	Sep 1992	f/2.8–22	11/9	2.5 m (8 ft 2 in)	8°10'	AF-D	2,950 g (6.50 lb)	124×241 mm (4.9×9.5 in)	(39)		
300 mm f/2.8D ED-IF AF-S (II)	Jul 1996	f/2.8–22	11/8	2.5 m (8 ft 2 in)	8°10'	AF-D	2,560 g (5.64 lb)	124×268.5 mm (4.9×10.6 in)	(39)		II focuses slightly closer and uses 52mm filters; released Feb 2001.
300 mm f/2.8G ED-IF AF-S (II)	Sep 2004	f/2.8–22	11/8	2.3 m (7 ft 7 in)	8°10'	AF-G	2,870 g (6.33 lb)	124×267.5 mm (4.9×10.5 in)	(52)		II released Dec 2009.
300 mm f/4 ED-IF AF	Jun 1987	f/4.0–32	8/6	2.5 m (8 ft 2 in)	8°10'	AF	1,330 g (2.93 lb)	89×219 mm (3.5×8.6 in)	82 (39)		
300 mm f/4D ED-IF AF-S	Aug 2000	f/4.0–32	10/6	1.45 m (4 ft 9 in)	8°10'	AF-D	1,440 g (3.17 lb)	90×222.5 mm (3.5×8.8 in)	77		
300 mm f/4E PF ED VR AF-S	Jan 2015	f/4.0–32	16/10	1.4 m (4 ft 7 in)	8°10'	AF-G	755 g (26.6 oz)	89×147.5 mm (3.5×5.8 in)	77		

====== Super-telephoto ======
Nikkor auto-focus FX format super telephoto lenses
Lens	Intro	Ap.	Eles / Grps	Min. Focus	Angle	Mount types	Weight	Size (Dia. × Len.)	Filter Thread (mm)	Photo	Notes
400 mm f/2.8D ED-IF AF-I	Jul 1994	f/2.8–22	10/7	3.3 m (11 ft)	6°10'	AF-D	5,150 g (11.35 lb)	158×376 mm (6.2×14.8 in)	(52)		
400 mm f/2.8D ED-IF AF-S (II)	Jan 1998	f/2.8–22	11/9	3.8 m (12 ft)	6°10'	AF-D	4,440 g (9.79 lb)	159.5×351.5 mm (6.3×13.8 in)	(52)		II focuses slightly closer; released Jun 2001.
400 mm f/2.8G ED VR AF-S	Aug 2007	f/2.8–22	14/11	2.9 m (9 ft 6 in)	6°10'	AF-G	4,620 g (10.19 lb)	159.5×368 mm (6.3×14.5 in)	(52)		
400 mm f/2.8E FL ED VR AF-S	May 2014	f/2.8–22	16/12	2.6 m (8 ft 6 in)	6°10'	AF-G	3,800 g (8.4 lb)	159.5×358 mm (6.3×14.1 in)	(40.5)		
500 mm f/4D ED-IF AF-I	Nov 1994	f/4.0–22	10/7	5 m (16 ft)	5°	AF-D	3,000 g (6.6 lb)	138×371 mm (5.4×14.6 in)	(52)		
500 mm f/4D ED-IF AF-S (II)	Jun 1997	f/4.0–22	11/9	5 m (16 ft)	5°	AF-D	3,430 g (7.56 lb)	139.5×394 mm (5.5×15.5 in)	(52)		II focuses slightly closer; released Jun 2001.
500 mm f/4G ED VR AF-S	Aug 2007	f/4.0–22	14/11	4 m (13 ft)	5°	AF-G	3,880 g (8.55 lb)	139.5×391 mm (5.5×15.4 in)	(52)		
500 mm f/4E FL ED VR AF-S	Jul 2015	f/4.0–22	16/12	3.6 m (12 ft)	5°	AF-G	3,090 g (6.81 lb)	140×387 mm (5.5×15.2 in)	(40.5)		
500 mm f/5.6E PF ED VR AF-S	Aug 2018	f/5.6–32	19/11	3 m (9.8 ft)	5°	AF-G	1,460 g (3.22 lb)	106×237 mm (4.2×9.3 in)	95		
600 mm f/4D ED-IF AF-I	Sep 1992	f/4.0–22	9/7	6 m (20 ft)	5°	AF-D	6,050 g (13.34 lb)	166×417 mm (6.5×16.4 in)	(52)		
600 mm f/4D ED-IF AF-S (II)	Jul 1996	f/4.0–22	10/7	6 m (20 ft)	4°10'	AF-D	4,750 g (10.47 lb)	166×430.5 mm (6.5×16.9 in)	(52)		II focuses slightly closer; released Jun 2001.
600 mm f/4G ED VR AF-S	Aug 2007	f/4.0–22	15/12	5 m (16 ft)	4°10'	AF-G	5,060 g (11.16 lb)	166×445 mm (6.5×17.5 in)	(52)		
600 mm f/4E FL ED VR AF-S	Jul 2015	f/4.0–22	16/12	4.4 m (14 ft)	4°10'	AF-G	3,810 g (8.40 lb)	166×432 mm (6.5×17.0 in)	(40.5)		
800 mm f/5.6E FL ED VR AF-S	Jan 2013	f/5.6–32	20/13	5.9 m (19 ft)	3°10'	AF-G	4,590 g (10.12 lb)	160×461 mm (6.3×18.1 in)	(40.5)		Bundled with dedicated 1.25× TC800 teleconverter.

====== Macro ======
Nikkor auto-focus FX format macro lenses
Lens	Intro	Ap.	Eles / Grps	Min. Focus (max repro)	Angle	Mount types	Weight	Size (Dia. × Len.)	Filter Thread (mm)	Photo	Notes
55 mm f/2.8 AF Micro	Sep 1986	f/2.8–32	6/5	0.229 m (9.0 in) (1:1)	43°	AF	420 g (15 oz)	74×74 mm (2.9×2.9 in)	62		
60 mm f/2.8D AF Micro	Nov 1989	f/2.8–32	8/7	0.219 m (8.6 in) (1:1)	39°40'	AF, AF-D	440 g (16 oz)	70×74.5 mm (2.8×2.9 in)	62		D added Oct 1993
60 mm f/2.8G AF-S ED Micro	Jan 2008	f/2.8–32	12/9	0.185 m (7.3 in) (1:1)	39°40'	AF-G	425 g (15.0 oz)	73×89 mm (2.9×3.5 in)	62		
105 mm f/2.8D AF Micro	Jun 1990	f/2.8–32	9/8	0.31 m (1 ft 0 in) (1:1)	23°20'	AF, AF-D	560 g (20 oz)	75×104.5 mm (3.0×4.1 in)	52		D added Oct 1993
105 mm f/2.8G AF-S ED IF VR Micro	Feb 2006	f/2.8–32	14/12	0.314 m (1 ft 0.4 in) (1:1)	23°20'	AF-G	750 g (26 oz)	83×116 mm (3.3×4.6 in)	62	Micro Nikkor 105 mm .mw-parser-output span.fnumber,.mw-parser-output .fnumber-fallback{display:inline-block;white-space:nowrap;width:max-content}.mw-parser-output span.fnumber::first-letter,.mw-parser-output .fnumber-fallback .first-letter{font-style:italic;font-family:Trebuchet MS,Candara,Georgia,Calibri,Corbel,serif}.mw-parser-output span.fnumber.noitalic::first-letter,.mw-parser-output .fnumber-fallback.noitalic .first-letter{font-style:normal;font-family:inherit}f/2.8 AF-S lens	
200 mm f/4D AF ED IF Micro	Oct 1993	f/4–32	13/8	0.5 m (1 ft 8 in) (1:1)	12°20'	AF-D	1,190 g (2.62 lb)	76×193 mm (3.0×7.6 in)	62		

===== DX format primes =====
Nikkor auto-focus DX format prime lenses
Lens	Intro	Ap.	Eles / Grps	Min. Focus	Angle (APS-C)	Mount types	Weight	Size (Dia. × Len.)	Filter Thread (mm)	Photo	Notes
10.5 mm f/2.8G ED AF DX Fisheye	Jul 2003	f/2.8–22	10/7	0.14 m (5.5 in)	180°	AF-G	305 g (10.8 oz)	63×62.5 mm (2.5×2.5 in)	Rear gel		
35 mm f/1.8G AF-S DX	Mar 2009	f/1.8–22	8/6	0.3 m (1 ft 0 in)	44°	AF-G	200 g (7.1 oz)	70×52.5 mm (2.8×2.1 in)	52		
40 mm f/2.8G AF-S DX Micro-Nikkor	Jul 2011	f/2.8–22	9/7	0.163 m (6.4 in)	38°50'	AF-G	235 g (8.3 oz)	68.5×64.5 mm (2.7×2.5 in)	52		
85 mm Micro-Nikkor f/3.5G ED AF-S VR DX	Oct 2009	f/3.5–22	14/10	0.286 m (11.3 in)	18°50'	AF-G	355 g (12.5 oz)	73×98.5 mm (2.9×3.9 in)	52		

==== AF zoom lenses ====
===== FX format zooms =====
Nikkor auto-focus FX format fisheye and wide-angle zoom lenses
Lens	Intro	Ap.	Eles / Grps	Min. Focus	Angle	Mount types	Weight	Size (Dia. × Len.)	Filter Thread (mm)	Photo	Notes
8–15 mm f/3.5–4.5E AF-S Fisheye ED	May 2017	f/3.5~4.5–22~29	15/13	0.16 m (6.3 in)	180°–175°	AF-G	485 g (17.1 oz)	77.5×83.0 mm (3.1×3.3 in)	—N/a		
14–24 mm f/2.8G AF-S ED	Aug 2007	f/2.8–22	14/11	0.28 m (11 in)	114°–84°	AF-G	1,000 g (2.2 lb)	98×131.5 mm (3.9×5.2 in)	—N/a		
16–35 mm f/4G AF-S ED VR	Jan 2010	f/4–22	17/12	0.28 m (11 in)	107°–63°	AF-G	680 g (24 oz)	82.5×125 mm (3.2×4.9 in)	77		
17–35 mm f/2.8D AF-S ED-IF	Jun 1999	f/2.8–22	13/10	0.28 m (11 in)	104°–62°	AF-D	745 g (26.3 oz)	82.5×106 mm (3.2×4.2 in)	77		
18–35 mm f/3.5–4.5D AF ED-IF	Aug 2000	f/3.5~4.5–22~32	11/8	0.33 m (1 ft 1 in)	100°–62°	AF-D	370 g (13 oz)	82.5×82.5 mm (3.2×3.2 in)	77		
18–35 mm f/3.5–4.5G AF-S ED	Jan 2013	f/3.5~4.5–22~29	12/8	0.28 m (11 in)	100°–63°	AF-G	385 g (13.6 oz)	83×95 mm (3.3×3.7 in)	77		
20–35 mm f/2.8D AF IF	Sep 1993	f/2.8–22	14/11	0.5 m (1 ft 8 in)	94°–62°	AF-D	640 g (23 oz)	82×94 mm (3.2×3.7 in)	77		
24–50 mm f/3.3–4.5D AF	Oct 1987	f/3.3~4.5–22	9/9	0.5 m (1 ft 8 in)	104°–62°	AF, AF-D	355 g (12.5 oz)	67.5×74.1 mm (2.7×2.9 in)	62		D released Dec 1995

Nikkor auto-focus FX format normal zoom lenses
Lens	Intro	Ap.	Eles / Grps	Min. Focus	Angle	Mount types	Weight	Size (Dia. × Len.)	Filter Thread (mm)	Photo	Notes
24–70 mm f/2.8G AF-S ED	Aug 2007	f/2.8–22	15/11	0.38 m (1 ft 3 in)	84°–34°20'	AF-G	900 g (32 oz)	83×133 mm (3.3×5.2 in)	77	Nikon AF-S 24-70mm f-2.8G ED	
24–70 mm f/2.8E AF-S ED VR	Aug 2015	f/2.8–22	20/16	0.38 m (1 ft 3 in)	84°–34°20'	AF-G	1,070 g (2.36 lb)	88.0×154.5 mm (3.5×6.1 in)	82		
24–85 mm f/2.8–4D AF IF	Aug 2000	f/2.8~4–22~32	15/11	0.38 m (1 ft 3 in)	84°–28°30'	AF-D	545 g (19.2 oz)	78.5×82.5 mm (3.1×3.2 in)	72		
24–85 mm f/3.5–4.5G AF-S ED IF	Feb 2002	f/3.5~4.5–22~29	15/12	0.38 m (1 ft 3 in)	84°–28°30'	AF-G	415 g (14.6 oz)	72×72.5 mm (2.8×2.9 in)	67		
24–85 mm f/3.5–4.5G AF-S ED VR	Jun 2012	f/3.5~4.5–22~29	16/11	0.38 m (1 ft 3 in)	84°–28°30'	AF-G	465 g (16.4 oz)	78×82 mm (3.1×3.2 in)	72		
24–120 mm f/3.5–5.6D AF IF	Oct 1996	f/3.5~5.6–22~32	15/11	0.5 m (1 ft 8 in)	84°–20°20'	AF-D	550 g (19 oz)	79×80 mm (3.1×3.1 in)	72	Nikon AF 24-120mm f/3.5-5.6 D IF ED	
24–120 mm f/3.5–5.6G AF-S ED-IF VR	Mar 2003	f/3.5~5.6–22~32	15/13	0.5 m (1 ft 8 in)	84°–20°20'	AF-G	575 g (20.3 oz)	77×94 mm (3.0×3.7 in)	72	Nikkor 24-120 mm .mw-parser-output span.fnumber,.mw-parser-output .fnumber-fallback{display:inline-block;white-space:nowrap;width:max-content}.mw-parser-output span.fnumber::first-letter,.mw-parser-output .fnumber-fallback .first-letter{font-style:italic;font-family:Trebuchet MS,Candara,Georgia,Calibri,Corbel,serif}.mw-parser-output span.fnumber.noitalic::first-letter,.mw-parser-output .fnumber-fallback.noitalic .first-letter{font-style:normal;font-family:inherit}f/3.5-5.6G AF-S VR FX lens: note red "VR" designation	
24–120 mm f/4G AF-S ED VR	Aug 2010	f/4–22	17/13	0.45 m (1 ft 6 in)	84°–20°20'	AF-G	710 g (25 oz)	84×103.5 mm (3.3×4.1 in)	77		
28–70 mm f/2.8D AF-S ED IF	Feb 1999	f/2.8–22	15/11	0.5 m (1 ft 8 in)	74°–34°20'	AF-D	935 g (33.0 oz)	88.5×121.5 mm (3.5×4.8 in)	77		
28–80 mm f/3.3–5.6G AF	Feb 2001	f/3.3~5.6–22	6/6	0.35 m (1 ft 2 in)	74°–30°10'	AF-G	195 g (6.9 oz)	66.5×64 mm (2.6×2.5 in)	58		
28–80 mm f/3.5–5.6D AF	Jan 1999	f/3.5~5.6–22	8/8	0.4 m (1 ft 4 in)	74°–30°10'	AF-G	265 g (9.3 oz)	65×79.5 mm (2.6×3.1 in)	58		
28–100 mm f/3.3–5.6G AF	Feb 2002	f/3.3~5.6–22	8/6	0.56 m (1 ft 10 in)	74°–24°20'	AF-G	245 g (8.6 oz)	68×80 mm (2.7×3.1 in)	62		
28–105 mm f/3.5–4.5D AF IF	Dec 1998	f/3.5~4.5–22	16/12	0.22 m (8.7 in)	74°–23°20'	AF-D	455 g (16.0 oz)	73×81.5 mm (2.9×3.2 in)	62		
35–70 mm f/2.8D AF	Oct 1987	f/2.8–22	15/12	0.28 m (11 in)	62°–34°20'	AF-D	665 g (23.5 oz)	71.5×94.5 mm (2.8×3.7 in)	62		D released Sep 1992

Nikkor auto-focus FX format telephoto zoom lenses
Lens	Intro	Ap.	Eles / Grps	Min. Focus	Angle	Mount types	Weight	Size (Dia. × Len.)	Filter Thread (mm)	Photo	Notes
70–180 mm f/4.5–5.6D AF ED Zoom-Micro	Sep 1997	f/4.5~5.6–32	18/14	0.37 m (1 ft 3 in) (1:1.32)	34°20' – 13°40'	AF-D	1,010 g (2.23 lb)	75×167 mm (3.0×6.6 in)	62		
70–200 mm f/2.8G AF-S ED VR (II)	Feb 2003	f/2.8–22	21/16	1.4 m (4 ft 7 in)	34°20'–12°20'	AF-G	1,540 g (3.40 lb)	87×205.5 mm (3.4×8.1 in)	77	Nikkor 70-200 mm .mw-parser-output span.fnumber,.mw-parser-output .fnumber-fallback{display:inline-block;white-space:nowrap;width:max-content}.mw-parser-output span.fnumber::first-letter,.mw-parser-output .fnumber-fallback .first-letter{font-style:italic;font-family:Trebuchet MS,Candara,Georgia,Calibri,Corbel,serif}.mw-parser-output span.fnumber.noitalic::first-letter,.mw-parser-output .fnumber-fallback.noitalic .first-letter{font-style:normal;font-family:inherit}f/2.8G AF-S VR II FX lens	II introduced Jul 2009.
70–200 mm f/2.8E AF-S FL ED VR	Oct 2016	f/2.8–22	22/18	1.1 m (3 ft 7 in)	34°20'–12°20'	AF-G	1,430 g (3.15 lb)	88.5×202.5 mm (3.5×8.0 in)	77		
70–200 mm f/4G AF-S ED VR	Oct 2012	f/4.0–32	20/14	1.0 m (3 ft 3 in)	34°20'–12°20'	AF-G	850 g (30 oz)	78.0×178.5 mm (3.1×7.0 in)	67		
70–300 mm f/4–5.6D AF ED	Mar 1998	f/4.0~5.6–32~45	13/9	1.5 m (4 ft 11 in)	34°20'–8°10'	AF-G	505 g (17.8 oz)	74×116 mm (2.9×4.6 in)	62		
70–300 mm f/4–5.6G AF	Aug 2000	f/4.0~5.6–32~45	13/9	1.5 m (4 ft 11 in)	34°20'–8°10'	AF-G	425 g (15.0 oz)	74×116.5 mm (2.9×4.6 in)	62		
70–300 mm f/4.5–5.6G AF-S ED-IF VR	Aug 2006	f/4.5~5.6–32~40	17/12	1.5 m (4 ft 11 in)	34°20'–8°10'	AF-G	745 g (26.3 oz)	80×143.5 mm (3.1×5.6 in)	67	Nikkor AF-S VR 70-300mm .mw-parser-output span.fnumber,.mw-parser-output .fnumber-fallback{display:inline-block;white-space:nowrap;width:max-content}.mw-parser-output span.fnumber::first-letter,.mw-parser-output .fnumber-fallback .first-letter{font-style:italic;font-family:Trebuchet MS,Candara,Georgia,Calibri,Corbel,serif}.mw-parser-output span.fnumber.noitalic::first-letter,.mw-parser-output .fnumber-fallback.noitalic .first-letter{font-style:normal;font-family:inherit}f/4.5-5.6G IF-ED	
70–300 mm f/4.5–5.6E AF-P ED VR	Jul 2017	f/4.5~5.6–32~40	18/14	1.2 m (3 ft 11 in)	34°20'–8°10'	AF-P	680 g (24 oz)	80.5×146 mm (3.2×5.7 in)	67		
80–200 mm f/2.8D AF ED	Nov 1987	f/2.8–22	16/11	1.8 m (5 ft 11 in)	30°10'–12°20'	AF, AF-D	1,300 g (2.9 lb)	87×187 mm (3.4×7.4 in)	77	80-200mm .mw-parser-output span.fnumber,.mw-parser-output .fnumber-fallback{display:inline-block;white-space:nowrap;width:max-content}.mw-parser-output span.fnumber::first-letter,.mw-parser-output .fnumber-fallback .first-letter{font-style:italic;font-family:Trebuchet MS,Candara,Georgia,Calibri,Corbel,serif}.mw-parser-output span.fnumber.noitalic::first-letter,.mw-parser-output .fnumber-fallback.noitalic .first-letter{font-style:normal;font-family:inherit}f/2.8 ED AF Zoom-Nikkor	D released Sep 1992; later revised with two-ring control (Jan 1997).
80–200 mm f/2.8D AF-S ED IF	Dec 1998	f/2.8–22	18/14	1.5 m (4 ft 11 in)	30°10'–12°20'	AF-D	1,580 g (3.48 lb)	88×207 mm (3.5×8.1 in)	77		
80–400 mm f/4.5–5.6D AF VR ED	Feb 2000	f/4.5~5.6–32~40	17/11	2.3 m (7 ft 7 in)	30°10'–6°10'	AF-D	1,360 g (3.00 lb)	91×171 mm (3.6×6.7 in)	77		
80–400 mm f/4.5–5.6G AF-S ED VR	Mar 2013	f/4.5~5.6–32~40	20/12	1.75 m (5 ft 9 in)	30°10'–6°10'	AF-G	1,570 g (3.46 lb)	95.5×203 mm (3.8×8.0 in)	77		
120–300 mm f/2.8E AF-S FL ED SR VR	Jan 2020	f/2.8–22	25/19	2.0 m (6 ft 7 in)	20°20'–8°10'	AF-G	3,250 g (7.17 lb)	128×303.5 mm (5.0×11.9 in)	112		
180–400 mm f/4E AF-S TC1.4 FL ED VR	Jan 2018	f/4–32	27/19 + 8/5	2.0 m (6 ft 7 in)	13°40'–6°10'; 9°50'–4°30' w/TC	AF-G	3,500 g (7.7 lb)	128×362.5 mm (5.0×14.3 in)	(40.5)		Built-in 1.4× teleconverter
200–400 mm f/4G AF-S ED VR (II)	Jul 2003	f/4–32	24/17	2.0 m (6 ft 7 in)	12°20'–6°10'	AF-G	3,360 g (7.41 lb)	124×365.5 mm (4.9×14.4 in)	(52)		II introduced Apr 2010.
200–500 mm f/5.6E AF-S ED VR	Aug 2015	f/5.6–32	19/12	2.2 m (7 ft 3 in)	12°20'–5°	AF-G	2,300 g (5.1 lb)	108×256.5 mm (4.3×10.1 in)	95		

Nikkor auto-focus FX format superzoom lenses
Lens	Intro	Ap.	Eles / Grps	Min. Focus	Angle	Mount types	Weight	Size (Dia. × Len.)	Filter Thread (mm)	Photo	Notes
28–200 mm f/3.5–5.6D AF IF	Feb 1998	f/3.5~5.6–22	16/13	0.85 m (2 ft 9 in)	74°–12°20'	AF-D	455 g (16.0 oz)	73×81.5 mm (2.9×3.2 in)	72		
28–200 mm f/3.5–5.6G AF ED IF	Mar 2003	f/3.5~5.6–22	12/11	0.85 m (2 ft 9 in)	74°–12°20'	AF-G	360 g (13 oz)	69.5×71 mm (2.7×2.8 in)	62		
28–300 mm f/3.5–5.6G AF-S ED VR	Aug 2010	f/3.5~5.6–22~38	19/14	0.5 m (1 ft 8 in)	75°–8°10'	AF-G	800 g (28 oz)	83×114.5 mm (3.3×4.5 in)	77		

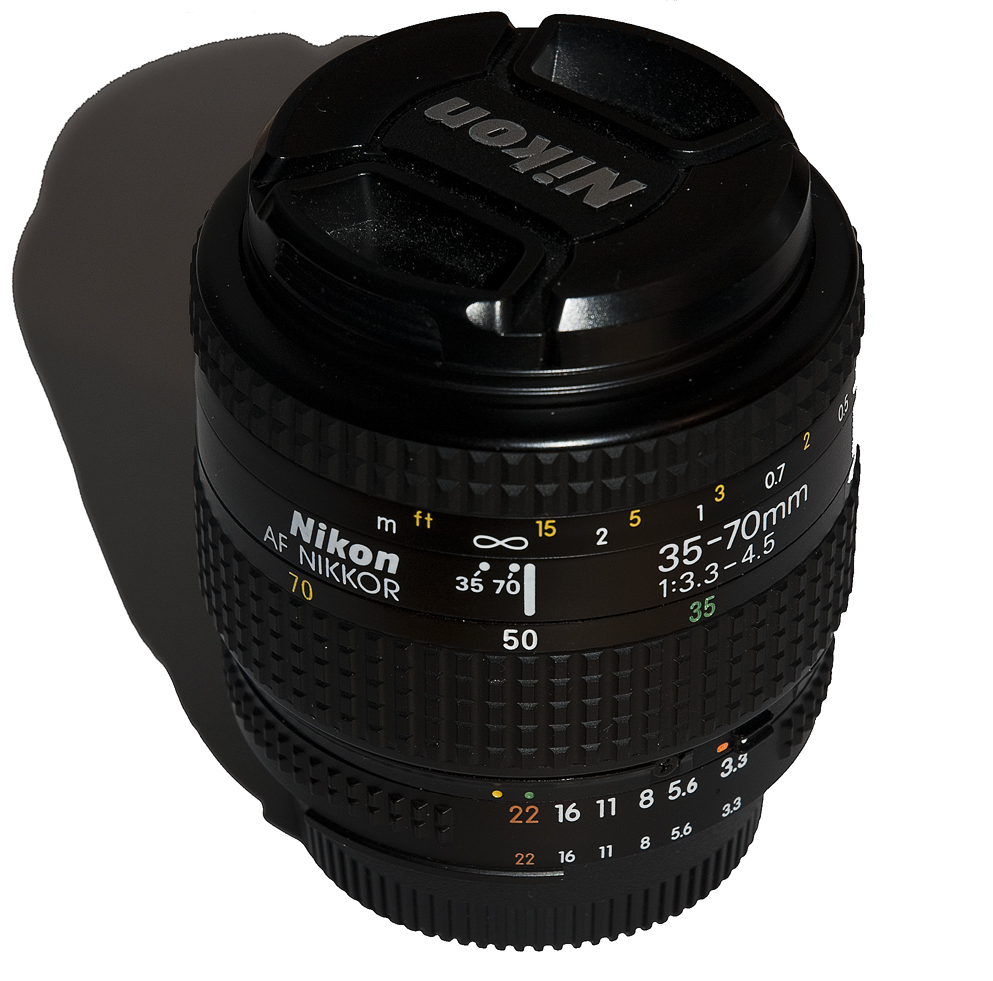
35-70mm f/3.3-4.5

- 28–70 mm f/3.5-4.5D AF
- 28–85 mm f/3.5-4.5 AF
- 35–70 mm f/3.3-4.5 AF
- 35–80 mm f/4-5.6D AF
- 35–105 mm f/3.5-4.5 AF
- 35–105 mm f/3.5-4.5D IF AF
- 35–135 mm f/3.5-4.5 AF
- 55–200 mm f/4-5.6G IF-ED Lens
- 70–210 mm f/4 AF
- 70–210 mm f/4-5.6 AF
- 70–210 mm f/4-5.6D AF
- 75–240 mm f/4.5-5.6D AF
- 75–300 mm f/4.5-5.6 AF
- 80–200 mm f/4.5-5.6D AF

===== DX format zooms =====
Nikkor auto-focus DX format wide-angle zoom lenses
Lens	Intro	Ap.	Eles / Grps	Min. Focus	Angle (APS-C)	Mount types	Weight	Size (Dia. × Len.)	Filter Thread (mm)	Photo	Notes
10–20 mm f/4.5–5.6G AF-P VR DX	May 2017	f/4.5~5.6–22~29	14/11	0.22 m (8.7 in)	109° ~ 70°	AF-G	230 g (8.1 oz)	77.0×73.0 mm (3.0×2.9 in)	72		
10–24 mm f/3.5-4.5 ED AF-S DX	Apr 2009	f/4.5~5.6–22~29	14/9	0.24 m (9.4 in)	109° ~ 61°	AF-G	460 g (16 oz)	82.5×87 mm (3.2×3.4 in)	77		
12–24 mm f/4G ED-IF AF-S DX	Mar 2003	f/4.0–22	11/7	0.3 m (1 ft 0 in)	99° ~ 61°	AF-G	465 g (16.4 oz)	82.5×90 mm (3.2×3.5 in)	77		

Nikkor auto-focus DX format normal zoom lenses
Lens	Intro	Ap.	Eles / Grps	Min. Focus	Angle (APS-C)	Mount types	Weight	Size (Dia. × Len.)	Filter Thread (mm)	Photo	Notes
16–80 mm f/2.8–4E AF-S VR DX	Jul 2015	f/2.8~4.0–22~32	17/13	0.35 m (1 ft 2 in)	83° ~ 20°	AF-E	480 g (17 oz)	80×85.5 mm (3.1×3.4 in)	72		
16–85 mm f/3.5-5.6G ED AF-S VR DX	Jan 2008	f/3.5~5.6–22~36	17/11	0.38 m (1 ft 3 in)	83° ~ 18°50'	AF-G	485 g (17.1 oz)	72×85 mm (2.8×3.3 in)	67		
17–55 mm f/2.8G ED-IF AF-S DX	Jul 2003	f/2.8–22	14/10	0.36 m (1 ft 2 in)	79° ~ 28°50'	AF-G	755 g (26.6 oz)	85.5×110.5 mm (3.4×4.4 in)	77		
18–55 mm f/3.5-5.6G ED AF-S DX	Apr 2005	f/3.5~5.6–22~38	7/5	0.28 m (11 in)	76° ~ 28°50'	AF-G	210 g (7.4 oz)	69×74 mm (2.7×2.9 in)	52		
18–55 mm f/3.5-5.6G ED AF-S II DX	Nov 2006	f/3.5~5.6–22~38	7/5	0.28 m (11 in)	76° ~ 28°50'	AF-G	205 g (7.2 oz)	70.5×74 mm (2.8×2.9 in)	52		
18–55 mm f/3.5-5.6G AF-S VR DX	Nov 2007	f/3.5~5.6–22~36	11/8	0.28 m (11 in)	76° ~ 28°50'	AF-G	265 g (9.3 oz)	73×79.5 mm (2.9×3.1 in)	52		
18–55 mm f/3.5-5.6G AF-S VR DX II	Jan 2014	f/3.5~5.6–22~36	11/8	0.28 m (11 in)	76° ~ 28°50'	AF-G	195 g (6.9 oz)	66×59.5 mm (2.6×2.3 in)	52		
18–55 mm f/3.5-5.6G AF-P DX	Jan 2016	f/3.5~5.6–22~38	12/9	0.25 m (9.8 in)	76° ~ 28°50'	AF-G	195 g (6.9 oz)	64.5×62.5 mm (2.5×2.5 in)	55		
18–55 mm f/3.5-5.6G AF-P VR DX	Jan 2016	f/3.5~5.6–22~38	12/9	0.25 m (9.8 in)	76° ~ 28°50'	AF-G	205 g (7.2 oz)	64.5×62.5 mm (2.5×2.5 in)	55		
18–70 mm f/3.5-4.5G ED-IF AF-S DX	Jan 2004	f/3.5~4.5–22~29	15/13	0.38 m (1 ft 3 in)	76° ~ 22°50'	AF-G	390 g (14 oz)	73×75.5 mm (2.9×3.0 in)	67	18-70 mm .mw-parser-output span.fnumber,.mw-parser-output .fnumber-fallback{display:inline-block;white-space:nowrap;width:max-content}.mw-parser-output span.fnumber::first-letter,.mw-parser-output .fnumber-fallback .first-letter{font-style:italic;font-family:Trebuchet MS,Candara,Georgia,Calibri,Corbel,serif}.mw-parser-output span.fnumber.noitalic::first-letter,.mw-parser-output .fnumber-fallback.noitalic .first-letter{font-style:normal;font-family:inherit}f/3.5-4.5G ED-IF AF-S DX Zoom	
18–105 mm f/3.5-5.6G ED VR	Aug 2008	f/3.5~5.6–22~38	15/11	0.45 m (1 ft 6 in)	76° ~ 15°20'	AF-G	420 g (15 oz)	76×89 mm (3.0×3.5 in)	67	18-105mm .mw-parser-output span.fnumber,.mw-parser-output .fnumber-fallback{display:inline-block;white-space:nowrap;width:max-content}.mw-parser-output span.fnumber::first-letter,.mw-parser-output .fnumber-fallback .first-letter{font-style:italic;font-family:Trebuchet MS,Candara,Georgia,Calibri,Corbel,serif}.mw-parser-output span.fnumber.noitalic::first-letter,.mw-parser-output .fnumber-fallback.noitalic .first-letter{font-style:normal;font-family:inherit}f/f3.5-5.6G ED-IF VR	

Nikkor auto-focus DX format superzoom lenses
Lens	Intro	Ap.	Eles / Grps	Min. Focus	Angle (APS-C)	Mount types	Weight	Size (Dia. × Len.)	Filter Thread (mm)	Photo	Notes
18–135 mm f/3.5-5.6G ED-IF AF-S DX	Aug 2006	f/3.5~5.6–22~38	15/13	0.45 m (1 ft 6 in)	76° ~ 12°	AF-G	385 g (13.6 oz)	73.5×86.5 mm (2.9×3.4 in)	67		
18–140 mm f/3.5-5.6G ED VR	Aug 2013	f/3.5~5.6–22~38	17/12	0.45 m (1 ft 6 in)	76° ~ 11°30'	AF-G	490 g (17 oz)	78×97 mm (3.1×3.8 in)	67		
18–200 mm f/3.5-5.6G ED-IF AF-S VR DX	Nov 2005	f/3.5~5.6–22~36	16/12	0.5 m (1 ft 8 in)	76° ~ 8°	AF-G	560 g (20 oz)	77×96.5 mm (3.0×3.8 in)	72	18-200 f/3.5-5,6 VR	
18–200 mm f/3.5-5.6G ED-IF AF-S VR DX II	Jul 2009	f/3.5~5.6–22~36	16/12	0.5 m (1 ft 8 in)	76° ~ 8°	AF-G	565 g (19.9 oz)	77×96.5 mm (3.0×3.8 in)	72		
18–300 mm f/3.5-5.6G ED-IF AF-S VR DX	Jun 2012	f/3.5~5.6–22~32	19/14	0.45 m (1 ft 6 in)	76° ~ 5°20'	AF-G	830 g (29 oz)	83×120 mm (3.3×4.7 in)	77		
18–300 mm f/3.5-6.3G ED-IF AF-S VR DX	Apr 2014	f/3.5~6.3–22~40	16/12	0.48 m (1 ft 7 in)	76° ~ 5°20'	AF-G	550 g (19 oz)	78.5×99 mm (3.1×3.9 in)	67		

Nikkor auto-focus DX format telephoto zoom lenses
Lens	Intro	Ap.	Eles / Grps	Min. Focus	Angle (APS-C)	Mount types	Weight	Size (Dia. × Len.)	Filter Thread (mm)	Photo	Notes
55–200 mm f/4-5.6G ED AF-S DX	Apr 2005	f/4~5.6–22~32	13/9	0.95 m (3 ft 1 in)	28°50' ~ 8°	AF-G	255 g (9.0 oz)	68×79 mm (2.7×3.1 in)	52		
55–200 mm f/4-5.6G ED AF-S VR DX	Mar 2007	f/4~5.6–22~32	15/11	1.1 m (3 ft 7 in)	28°50' ~ 8°	AF-G	335 g (11.8 oz)	73.0×99.5 mm (2.9×3.9 in)	52		
55–200 mm f/4-5.6G ED AF-S VR DX II	Jan 2015	f/4~5.6–22~32	15/11	1.1 m (3 ft 7 in)	28°50' ~ 8°	AF-G	300 g (11 oz)	70.5×83 mm (2.8×3.3 in)	52		
55–300 mm f/4.5-5.6G ED AF-S VR DX	Aug 2010	f/4.5~5.6–22~29	17/11	1.4 m (4 ft 7 in)	28°50' ~ 5°20'	AF-G	530 g (19 oz)	76.5×123 mm (3.0×4.8 in)	58		
70–300 mm f/4.5-6.3G ED AF-P DX	Aug 2016	f/4.5~6.3–22~32	14/10	1.1 m (3 ft 7 in)	22°50' ~ 5°20'	AF-G	400 g (14 oz)	72×125 mm (2.8×4.9 in)	58		
70–300 mm f/4.5-6.3G ED AF-P DX VR	Aug 2016	f/4.5~6.3–22~32	14/10	1.1 m (3 ft 7 in)	22°50' ~ 5°20'	AF-G	415 g (14.6 oz)	72×125 mm (2.8×4.9 in)	58		

===== IX-Nikkor zooms =====
IX-Nikkor zoom lenses were designed and released for the Nikon Pronea line of Advanced Photo System SLRs. Although the IX-Nikkor zooms use the same electrical and mechanical F-mount interface, they were designed to cover the smaller APS-H frame size of 16.7×30.2 mm (0.66×1.19 in) with a shorter backfocus than 35 mm Nikkor lenses, so the rear elements of IX-Nikkor lenses protrude more deeply into the camera body than conventional 35 mm Nikkor lenses. This means Pronea cameras can accept conventional Nikkor F-mount lenses, but IX-Nikkor lenses cannot be used with non-Pronea Nikon SLRs without locking up the mirror. IX-Nikkor lenses use the same electronic communications as Nikkor AF lenses with distance encoding (AF-D), so they may be adapted to Z-mount mirrorless interchangeable lens cameras in DX (cropped sensor) mode.

IX-Nikkor auto-focus zoom lenses
Lens	Intro	Ap.	Eles / Grps	Min. Focus	Angle (APS-C)	Mount types	Weight	Size (Dia. × Len.)	Filter Thread (mm)	Photo	Notes
20–60 mm f/3.5-5.6	Sep 1996	f/3.5~5.6–22	9/7	0.35 m (14 in)	82–32° (74–28°)	IX	170 g (6.0 oz)	65×53 mm (2.6×2.1 in)	52		Revised in 1998 with improved coatings.
24–70 mm f/3.5-5.6	Sep 1996	f/3.5~5.6–22	7/7	0.35 m (14 in)	71–28° (64–24°)	IX	175 g (6.2 oz)	65×59 mm (2.6×2.3 in)	52		
30–60 mm f/4-5.6	Sep 1998	f/4~5.6–22	6/6	0.35 m (14 in)	60–32° (53–28°)	IX	95 g (3.4 oz)	115×101 mm (4.5×4.0 in)	46		
60–180 mm f/4-5.6	Sep 1996	f/4~5.6–22	11/8	1.2 m (47 in)	32–11° (28–10°)	IX	270 g (9.5 oz)	70×75 mm (2.8×3.0 in)	52		
60–180 mm f/4.5-5.6	1998	f/4.5~5.6–22	10/7	1.2 m (47 in)	32–11° (28–10°)	IX	220 g (7.8 oz)	62.5×69.5 mm (2.46×2.74 in)	46		

==== Lenses with integrated autofocus motors ====
Nikkor lenses designated AF-S, AF-I and AF-P have integrated autofocus motors, but other manufacturers included in the list do not designate it as clearly. These lenses are needed for autofocus on certain newer low-end Nikon cameras which lack an autofocus motor. Cameras without an autofocus motor are the Nikon D40, D40X, D60, D3xxx (most recent: D3500), D5xxx (most recent: D5600), the Nikon 1 series with FT1 adapter, and the Nikon Z-mount cameras with FTZ adapter.

=== Teleconverters ===
- TC-1 (2.0x)
- TC-2 (2.0x)
- TC-14 (1.4x)
- TC-14A (1.4x)
- TC-14B (1.4x)
- TC-14C (1.4x) (supplied exclusively with Nikkor 300mm f/2 Ai-S IF-ED)
- TC-14E (1.4x)
- TC-14E II (1.4x)
- TC-14E III (1.4x)
- TC-16 (1.6x) (F3AF only)
- TC-16A (1.6x)
- TC-17E II (1.7x)
- TC-20E (2.0x)
- TC-20E II (2.0x)
- TC-20E III (2.0x)
- TC-200 (2.0x)
- TC-300 (2.0x)
- TC-201 (2.0x)
- TC-301 (2.0x)
- TC800-1.25E ED (1.25x) (supplied exclusively with Nikkor AF-S 800mm f/5.6 FL ED-IF VR N)

=== Other accessories ===
Nikon makes two different caps for the lenses and cameras:

- The LF-4 is the current official rear lens cap. It protects the rear element of a Nikkor F lens from dust, smudges, and scratches when the lens is detached from the camera body.
- The BF-1B is the current official body cap. It protects an F-camera's insides or sensor when a lens is not attached.

== Other brands ==
=== Zeiss ZF ===
Zeiss ZF series lenses are manual-focus designs Nikon AI-S type aperture indexing. They are manufactured by Cosina to Zeiss specifications.

Four design variations are designated ZF, ZF.2, ZF-I, and ZF-IR.

ZF is the original product line. ZF.2 lenses are CPU-enabled (similar to Nikon AI-P lenses) offering full metering compatibility with the full range of AF Nikon SLR cameras. ZF-I lenses add mechanical locks for focus and aperture, and additional environmental sealing, for industrial applications. ZF-IR lenses are adapted to infrared imaging, with coatings that transmit wavelengths up to 1100 nm, and focus scales marked for infrared.

=== Zeiss CP.2 ===
CP.2 lenses are a series of Zeiss "CompactPrime" cinema lenses which present F-mount as one of three mounting options. The lenses cover the 36×24 mm area of the 35mm format or Nikon FX format, and lenses 28 mm and longer share a common T-stop (T/) of 2.1.

=== Kiev-Arsenal ===
- MC TS Arsat 35mm f/2.8 Tilt Shift
- MC Peleng 8mm f/3.5
- MC Peleng 17mm f/2,8
- MC Arsat-H 50mm f/1,4
- MC ZOOM Arsat-M 80-200mm f/4,5
- MC Kalejnar-5H 100mm f/2.8
- APO Arsat-H 300mm f/2,8

=== Angénieux ===
- 28–70 mm f/2.6 AF
- 35–70 mm f/2.5-3.3
- 70–210 mm f/3.5
- 180 mm f/2.3 DEM APO
- 200 mm f/2.8 DEM ED

=== Schneider Kreuznach ===
- PC Super-Angulon 28 mm f/2.8
- PC-TS Super-Angulon 50 mm f/2.8 HM
- PC-TS Makro-Symmar 90 mm f/4.0 HM

== Compatible cameras ==
The following cameras and camera families can use an F-mount lens:

- Nikon "F" (Film SLRs), "N" (rebranded F-series for the U.S. market), and "D" (Digital SLRs) series SLR cameras.
  - Digital cameras
  - also see the complete list in the Category:Nikon F-mount cameras (at the bottom of this page)
- Nikkormat (Nikomat in Japan) "F" and "EL" series SLR cameras.
- Nikon 1 series with FT1 adapter
- Nikon Z series with FTZ adapter
- Fujifilm SLRs based on Nikon bodies, including:
  - FinePix S1 Pro
  - FinePix S2 Pro
  - FinePix S3 Pro
  - FinePix S5 Pro
  - Fujifilm FinePix IS Pro
- Canon M15P-CL Industrial Camera
- Kodak SLRs DCS series based on Nikon bodies, including:
  - Kodak DCS-100
  - Kodak DCS-200
  - Kodak NC2000 / NC2000e
  - Kodak DCS 315 / 330
  - Kodak DCS-410
  - Kodak DCS-420
  - Kodak DCS-460
  - Kodak DCS 620 / 620x
  - Kodak DCS 660 / 660M
  - Kodak DCS 720x
  - Kodak DCS 760
  - Kodak DCS Pro 14n
  - Kodak DCS Pro 14nx
  - Kodak DCS Pro SLR/n
- Medium-format systems
  - Horseman DigiWide camera
  - Sinar "m" system (using 35mm Mirror Module)
- OpenReflex
- Video cameras
  - edgertronic SC1 high speed video camera
  - JVC JY-HMQ30 (4K resolution)
  - Red One digital video camera (using Red F-mount)
  - Camera-like "adapters"
    - Redrock M2
    - Letus Extreme
    - Shoot35 SGpro
    - P+S Technik Mini35
    - Movietube
- Kiev Arsenal
  - Kiev 17
  - Kiev 19
  - Kiev 19M
  - Kiev 20
- Ricoh Singlex (a.k.a. Sears SLII)

== See also ==
- Nikon Z-mount
- History of the single-lens reflex camera
- Full-frame digital SLR
- Nikon S-mount
- Nikon 1-mount
- List of Nikon F-mount lenses with integrated autofocus motors
- Lenses for SLR and DSLR cameras

== Notes ==
Class	1950s			1960s										1970s										1980s										1990s										2000s										2020s			
Class	57	58	59	60	61	62	63	64	65	66	67	68	69	70	71	72	73	74	75	76	77	78	79	80	81	82	83	84	85	86	87	88	89	90	91	92	93	94	95	96	97	98	99	00	01	02	03	04	05	06	07	08	09	...	20	21	22
Profes- sional			F																					F3																																	
Profes- sional															F2												F3AF					F4								F5								F6									
High- end																											FA					F-801 (N8008)/ F-801s (N8008s)				F90 (N90)		F90X (N90s)					F100														
Mid- range																														F-501 (N2020)				F-601 (N6006)				F70 (N70)						F80 (N80)													
Mid- range																EL / EL2 /ELW						FE					FE2							F-601M (N6000)				F70 (N70)						F80 (N80)													
Mid- range									FT		FTn/ FT2/ FT3										FM					FM2/FM2n																			FM3A												
Mid- range									FS												FM					FM2/FM2n																			FM3A												
Entry- level																																																									
Entry- level																																								Pronea 600i/6i																	
Entry- level																																										Pronea S															
Entry- level						Nikkorex F / Nikkor J																	EM			FG			F-301 (N2000)				F-401s (N4004s)					F50 (N50)							F65 (N65 / U)		F75 (N75 / U2)										
Entry- level				35		35 II		Auto 35																				FG-20			F-401 (N4004)				F-401x (N5005)								F60 (N60)			F55 (N55)											
Entry- level							Zoom 35																																FM10 / FE10																		
Class	57	58	59	60	61	62	63	64	65	66	67	68	69	70	71	72	73	74	75	76	77	78	79	80	81	82	83	84	85	86	87	88	89	90	91	92	93	94	95	96	97	98	99	00	01	02	03	04	05	06	07	08	09	...	20	21	22
Class	1950s			1960s										1970s										1980s										1990s										2000s										2020s			

Sensor	Class	1999	2000	2001	2002	2003	2004	2005	2006	2007	2008	2009	2010	2011	2012	2013	2014	2015	2016	2017	2018	2019	2020	2021	2022	2023	2024	2025	2026
FX (Full-frame)	Flagship											D3X ^{−P}																	
FX (Full-frame)	Flagship										D3 ^{−P}		D3S ^{−P}		D4		D4S		D5^{T}					D6^{T}					
FX (Full-frame)	Professional											D700 ^{−P}			D800/D800E			D810/D810A			D850 ^{AT}								
FX (Full-frame)	Enthusiast																Df												
FX (Full-frame)	Enthusiast																	D750 ^{A}					D780 ^{AT}						
FX (Full-frame)	Enthusiast															D600	D610												
DX (APS-C)	Flagship		D1^{−E}	D1X^{−E}				D2X^{−E}		D2Xs^{−E}																			
DX (APS-C)	Flagship		D1^{−E}	D1H ^{−E}			D2H^{−E}	D2Hs^{−E}																					
DX (APS-C)	Professional				D100^{−E}				D200^{−E}		D300^{−P}		D300S^{−P}						D500 ^{AT}										
DX (APS-C)	Enthusiast						D70^{−E}		D70s^{−E}	D80^{−E}		D90^{−E}		D7000 ^{−P}			D7100	D7200			D7500 ^{AT}								
DX (APS-C)	Upper-entry								D50^{−E}	D40X^{−E*}	D60^{−E*}		D5000^{A−P*}		D5100^{A−P*}	D5200^{A−P*}	D5300^{A*}	D5500^{AT*}		D5600 ^{AT*}									
DX (APS-C)	Entry-level									D40^{−E*}			D3000^{−E*}	D3100^{−P*}		D3200^{−P*}	D3300^{*}			D3400^{*}		D3500^{*}							
Early models		SVC (prototype; 1986); QV-1000C (1988); NASA F4 (1991); E2/E2S (1995); E2N/E2NS (1996); E3/E3S (1998)																											
Sensor	Class																												
Sensor	Class	1999	2000	2001	2002	2003	2004	2005	2006	2007	2008	2009	2010	2011	2012	2013	2014	2015	2016	2017	2018	2019	2020	2021	2022	2023	2024	2025	2026
