= Nikon AF-S DX Zoom-Nikkor 18-70mm f/3.5-4.5G ED-IF =

AF-S DX Zoom-Nikkor 18-70mm f/3.5–4.5G ED-IF
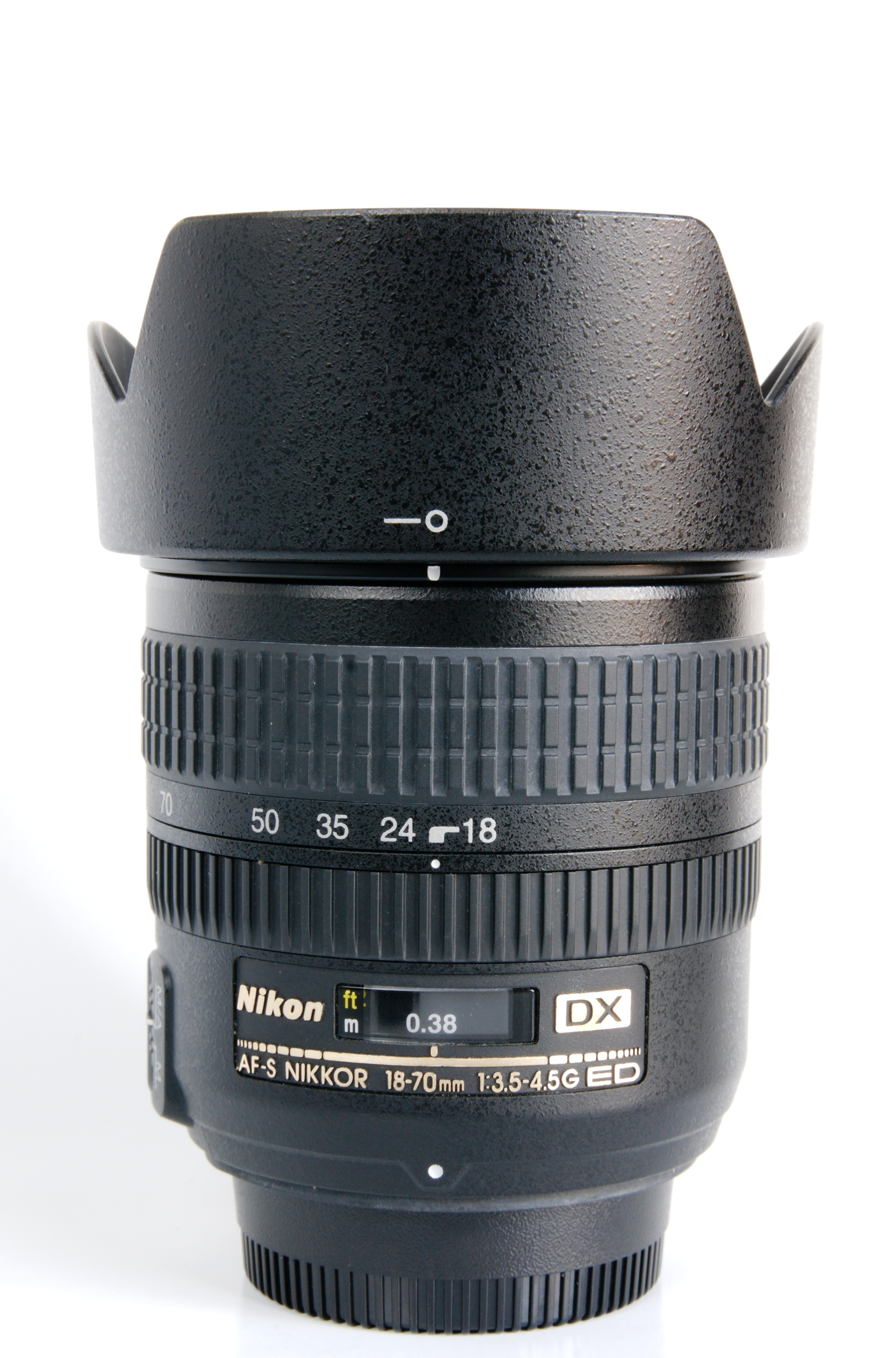
- Maker: Nikon
- Lens mount: F-mount

Technical data
- Type: Zoom
- Focal length: 18-70mm
- Focal length (35mm equiv.): 27-105mm
- Crop factor: 1.5
- Aperture (max/min): f/3.5–22 (wide) f/4.5–29 (tele)
- Close focus distance: 0.38m
- Max. magnification: 1:6.2
- Diaphragm blades: 7 (rounded)
- Construction: 15 elements in 13 groups

Features
- Ultrasonic motor: Yes Yes
- Lens-based stabilization: No No
- Macro capable: No No
- Application: Standard Zoom

Physical
- Max. length: 75.5 mm (@ 18mm)
- Diameter: 73mm
- Weight: 390 g
- Filter diameter: 67mm

Accessories
- Lens hood: HB-32
- Case: CL-0915

Angle of view
- Diagonal: 76° – 22°50'

History
- Introduction: January 2004

Retail info
- MSRP: 399.99 USD

The AF-S DX Zoom-Nikkor 18-70mm f/3.5–4.5G ED-IF is an F-mount zoom lens manufactured and sold by Nikon. Designed exclusively for use on Nikon DX format cameras, this lens covers from wide-angle to medium-telephoto range.

This lens was announced in January 2004 and was initially available as kit lens for the then-new Nikon D70. Later, it was possible to acquire separately and as a kit with other Nikon cameras.

Lens construction includes one composite aspherical and three Extra-low Dispersion (ED) elements to correct distortion and aberrations. This helps overall lens performance, which is rated excellent on most respects except light falloff. This lens has been largely supplanted by those lenses which have since been supplied as the kit lenses for the Nikon prosumer cameras; first the 18-135mm AF-S which shipped with the Nikon D80 and later the 18-105mm AF-S VR which ships with the Nikon D90.

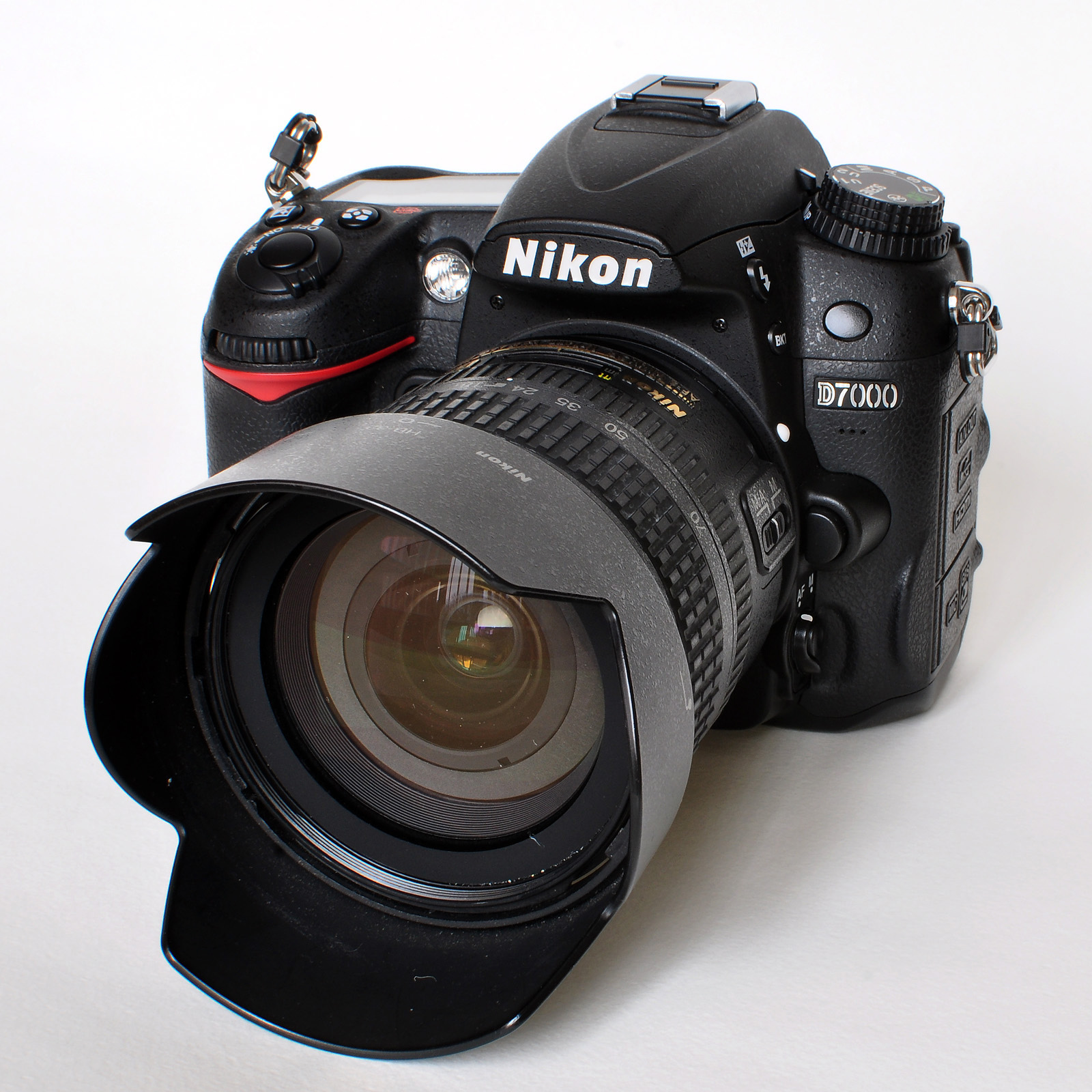
Mounted on a Nikon D7000

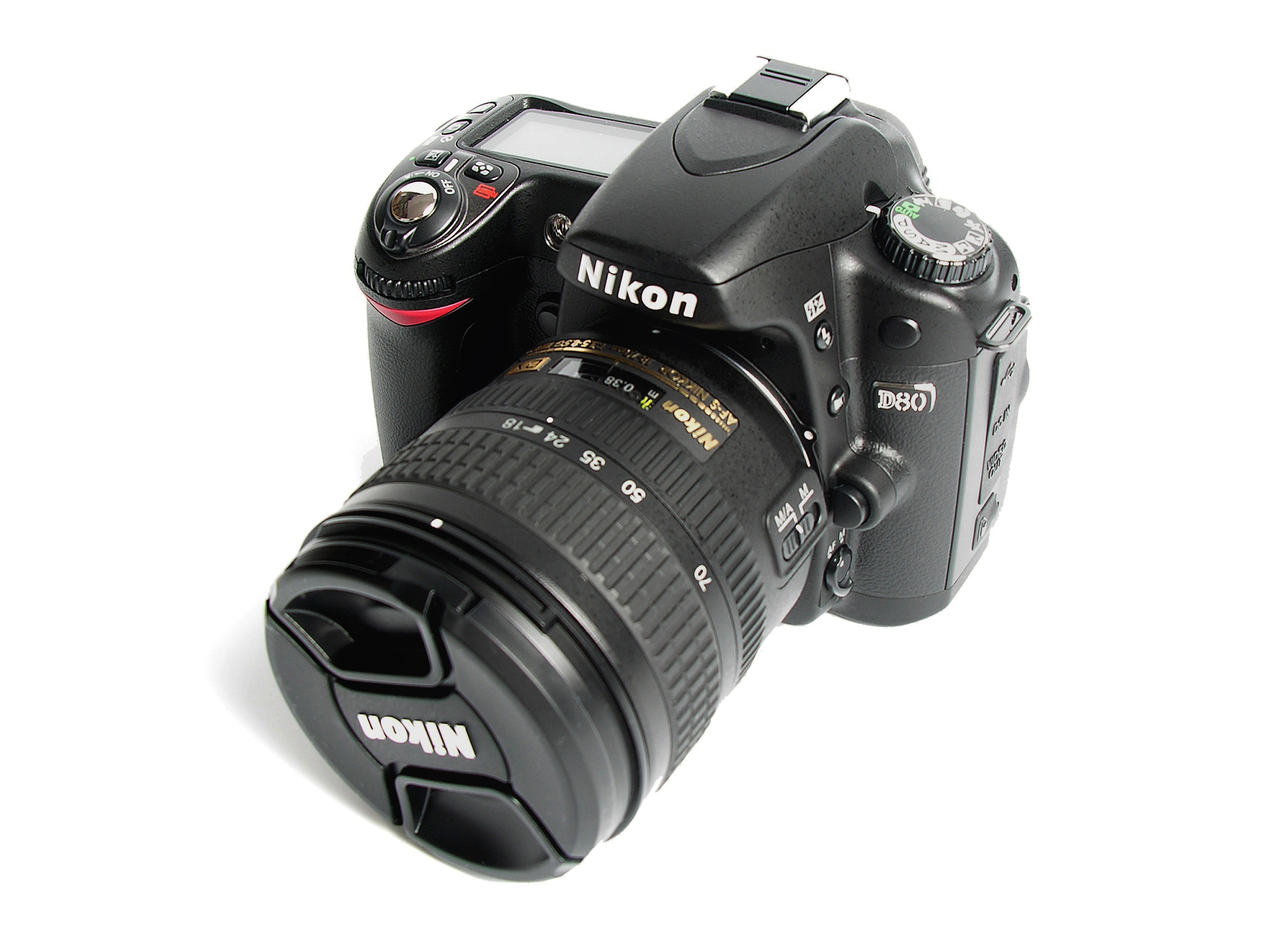
Mounted on a Nikon D80

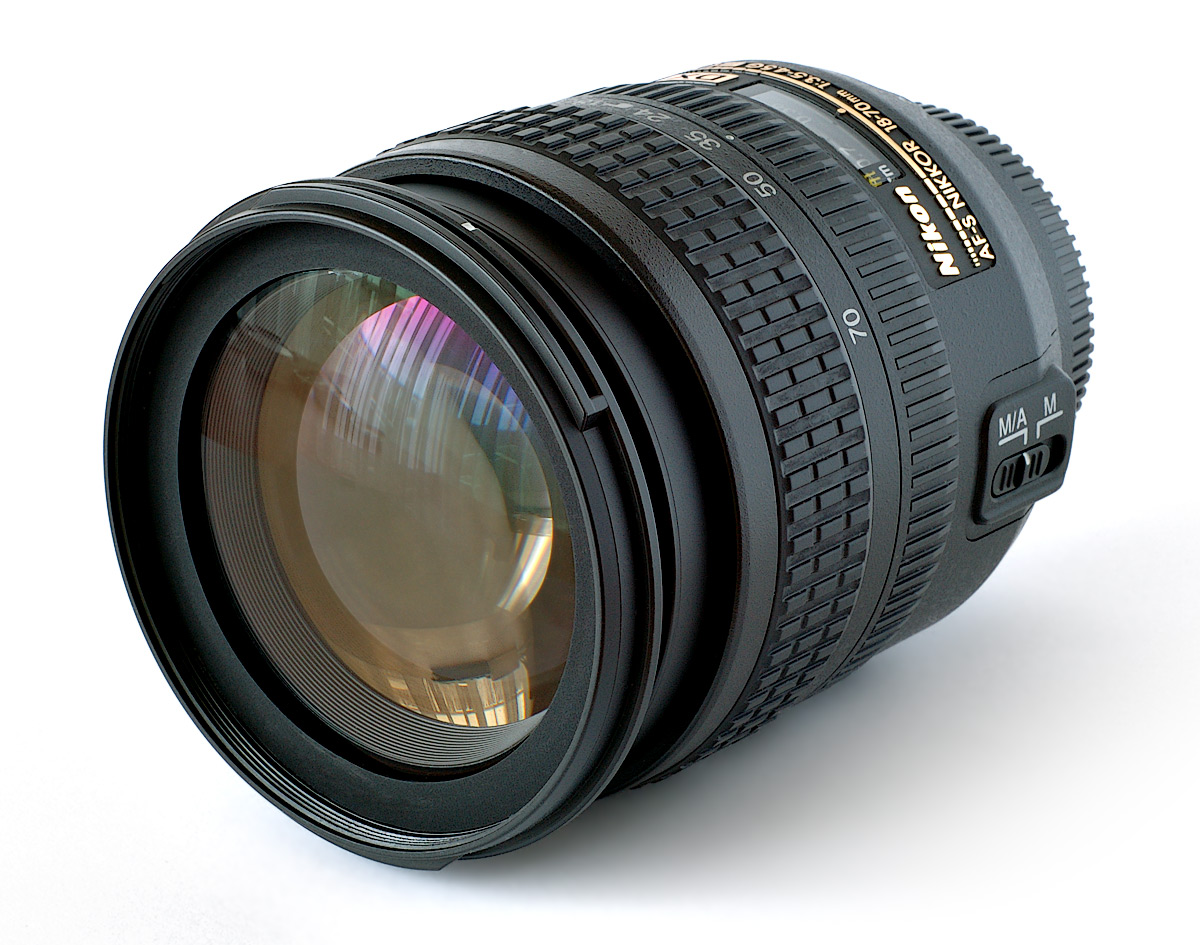

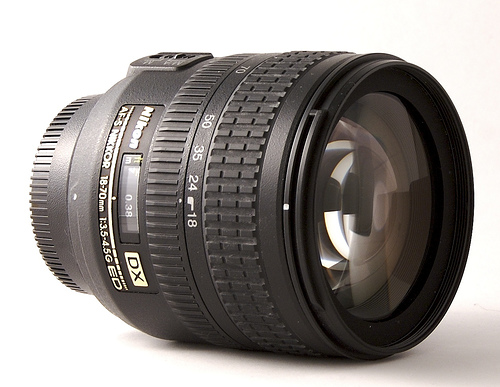

== See also ==
- List of Nikon compatible lenses with integrated autofocus-motor
