= Nikon F 70-300mm lens =

Telephoto zoom lens made by Nikon

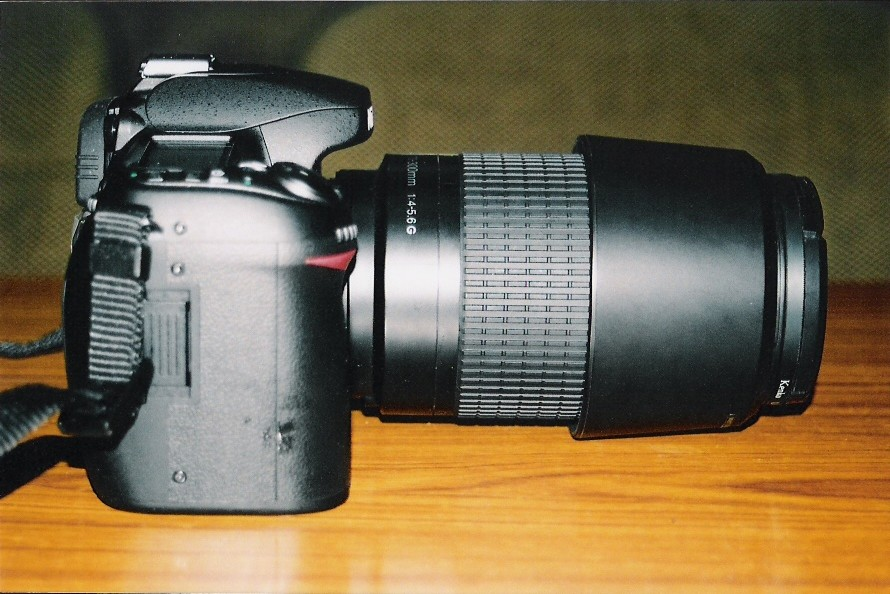
A Nikon D80 with a Nikkor AF f/4-5.6G and inverted lens hood.

The 70-300mm lens is a telephoto zoom lens made by Nikon. The lens has an F-mount to work with all the SLRs line of cameras (except the early 70-300G with the D40), although the more recent AF-P lenses will not focus on film SLRs or older DSLRs (roughly before 2013).

The lens comes in seven different versions:

- AF f/4-5.6D
- AF f/4-5.6D ED
- AF f/4-5.6G
- AF-S f/4.5-5.6G IF-ED VR
- AF-P f/4.5-6.3G ED DX
- AF-P f/4.5-6.3G ED VR DX
- AF-P f/4.5-5.6E ED VR

It is the successor of the 70-210 lens, which targets the prosumer market, one grade lower than 80-200mm with large aperture.

Introduced in August 2006, the current incarnation of the lens (AF-S VR f/4.5-5.6G IF-ED) improves on the original with VR stabilization technology as well as with internally focusing components (IF). More expensive than its partner 55-200mm lens, its construction is similar, with the exterior shell being fabricated from plastic components. This is extremely lightweight telephoto lens. It also shares a similarly stiff zoom ring with the 55-200mm, although a side benefit of this is that zoom creep is eliminated. Unlike the 55-200, the 70-300mm lens is full-frame. Also, the longer barrel length allowed the focus ring to be relocated in front of the zoom ring, making manual focus operations simpler.

== Specifications ==
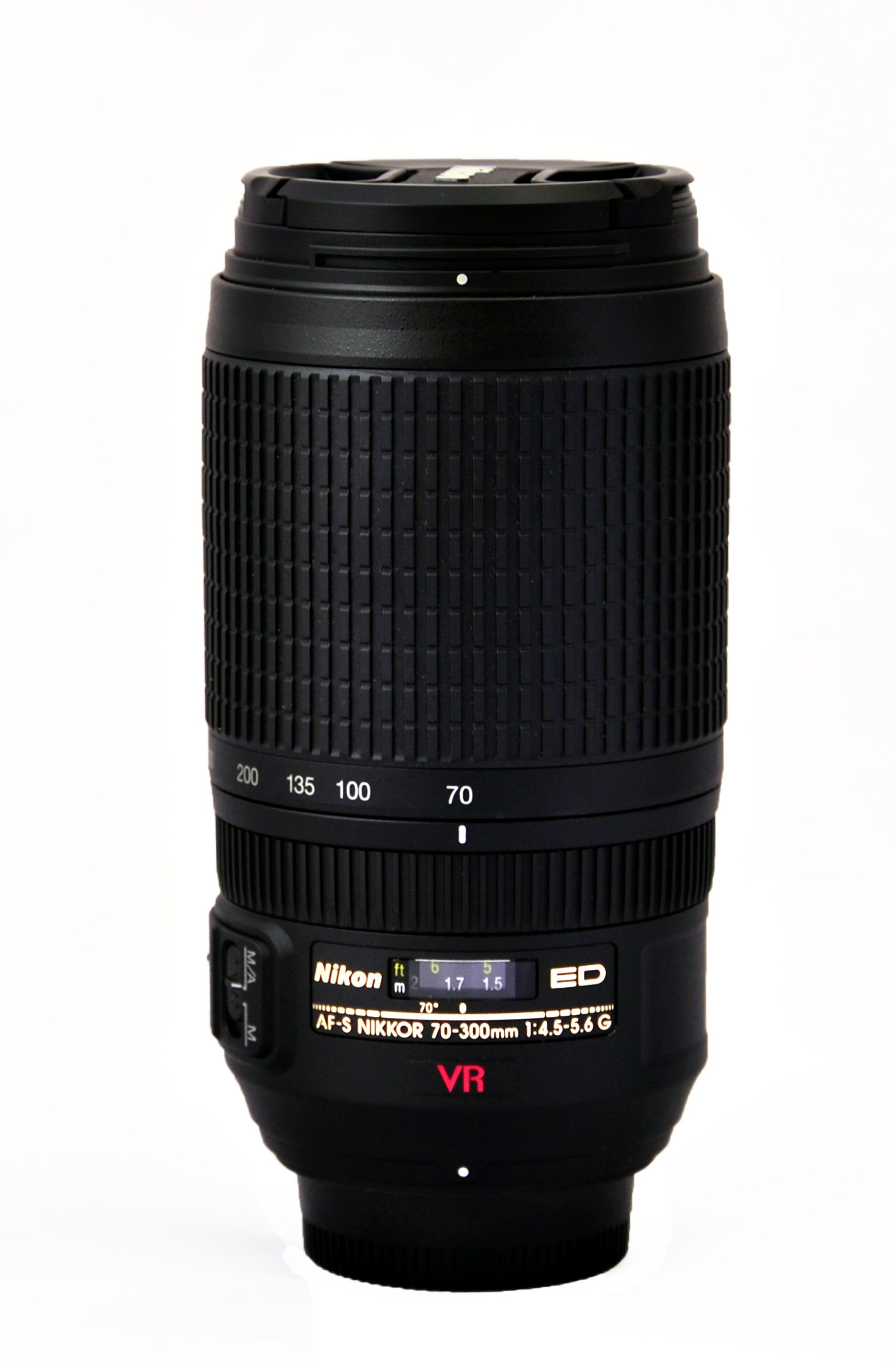
Nikkor AF-S VR 70-300mm f/4.5-5.6G IF-ED

Attribute	AF f/ 4-5.6G	AF f/4-5.6D ED	AF-S VR f/4.5-5.6G IF-ED
Vibration Reduction	No No		Yes Yes
Silent Wave Motor	No No		Yes Yes
Maximum aperture	f/4-5.6		f/4.5-5.6
Minimum aperture	f/32		f/32-40
Weight	425 g	505 g	745 g
Maximum diameter	74 mm		80 mm
Length	116.5 mm	116 mm	143.5 mm
Filter diameter	62 mm		67 mm
Horizontal viewing angle			
Vertical viewing angle			
Diagonal viewing angle			
Groups/elements	9/13		12/17
# of diaphragm blades	9		
Closest focusing distance	1.5 metres		
Release date	24 March 2001	25 March 1998	9 August 2006
MSRP $			

== See also ==
- List of Nikon compatible lenses with integrated autofocus-motor
- Nikon F 70-210mm lens
- Nikon F 80-200mm lens
- Canon EF 70-300mm lens
