= Nikon D50 =

2005 DX-format digital single-lens reflex camera

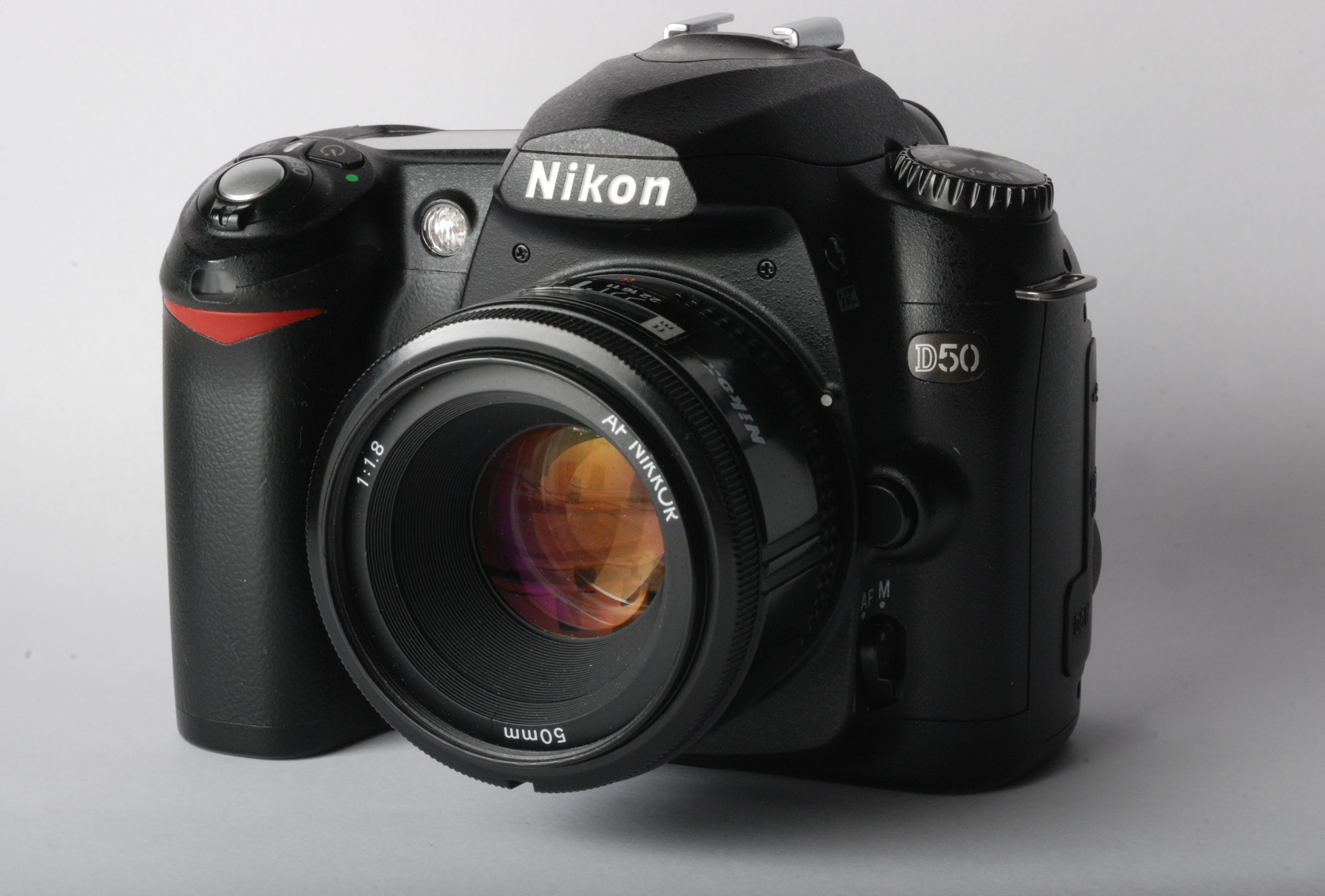

Overview
- Maker: Nikon
- Type: Digital single-lens reflex

Lens
- Lens: Interchangeable Nikon F-mount

Sensor/medium
- Sensor: CCD
- Maximum resolution: 3,008 × 2,000 (6.1 effective megapixels)
- Recording medium: SD memory card

Focusing
- Focus modes: Manual, Single shot AF, Continuous AF, Automatic AF Selection (AF operation subject to lens compatibility)
- Focus areas: 5 zone selectable: single area, dynamic area, closest subject

Exposure/metering
- Exposure modes: Automatic, Portrait, Landscape, Child, Sport, Closeup, Night Portrait, Manual, Aperture Priority, Shutter Priority, Programmed Auto
- Exposure metering: TTL full-aperture exposure metering system
- Metering modes: Spot, Center Weighted, Matrix

Shutter
- Shutter: Electromechanical vertical-travel focal-plane type
- Shutter speed range: 1/4000 to 30 seconds, bulb; 1/500 flash X-sync
- Continuous shooting: 2.5 frame/s, up to 12 shots (JPEG) or 4 shots (NEF)

Viewfinder
- Viewfinder: Optical TTL

Image processing
- White balance: Automatic, Incandescent, Fluorescent, Direct Sunlight, Flash, Cloudy, Shade, Preset (Custom)

General
- LCD screen: 2.0 in (51 mm), 130,000 dot TFT
- Battery: Nikon EN-EL3 family
- Optional battery packs: Nikon EN-EL3a and EN-EL3e
- Weight: 544 g (19 oz) (1.199 lb) body only; 616 g (1.358 lb) with EN-EL3 battery; 826 g (1.821 lb) with battery and AF-S DX ZOOM - NIKKOR 1 8 - 5 5 mm f/3.5-5.6 GED kit lens
- Made in: Thailand

The Nikon D50 is a 6.1-megapixel entry-level digital single-lens reflex camera, sold from June 2005 until November 2006 by Nikon. It was Nikon's first DSLR aimed at the consumer market, and sold for US$899. It uses the Nikon F mount. The D50 is similar to the slightly older D70 using the same CCD sensor, with a slower maximum shutter speed and slightly smaller size. However, it continued to offer the internal focus motor of prior autofocus film and digital SLRs; making it suitable for the use of autofocus with late film-era Nikkor AF and AF-D lenses. Future entry-level Nikon DSLRs (D40, D60, D3000, D5000) would eliminate the internal focus motor and require these motors to be in the lenses.

== Features ==
It has a 23.7 mm by 15.6 mm DX format image sensor with 6.1 million effective pixels. It also has a 2.0 in (51 mm) polysilicon TFT LCD with 130,000 pixels. The camera uses a through-the-lens full-aperture exposure metering system. It can simultaneously record NEF and JPEG data to a Secure Digital storage device. Like its newer, higher-end sibling (the D80), the D50 uses Secure Digital instead of CompactFlash cards found on previous Nikon digital SLRs. The camera is powered by a rechargeable lithium-ion battery which is claimed to be able to take up to 2,000 shots on a single charge. The camera is compatible with PictBridge printers and can shoot 2.5 frames per second in continuous mode. The camera's dimensions are 133 mm in width, 102 mm in height, and 76 mm in depth.

The D50 is the only entry-level Nikon DSLR to have the autofocus motor ('screw drive') built into the camera body, making the camera backwards-compatible with mechanical-drive autofocus lenses (Nikkor AF/AF-D series) dating back to 1986. This feature has been eliminated on later entry-level models and is currently only available on mid-range and advanced models. This makes the D50 the lightest Nikon DSLR to have the autofocus motor.

This camera has many settings that can only be accessed by selecting a detailed menu view. One such feature is the ability to make a series of differently-exposed images for processing into HDRI photographs. The camera menu refers to this setting as BKT (Bracketed Set).

== Market ==
The D50 was announced on April 20, 2005 and went on sale in June 2005. When introduced, the camera carried a suggested retail price of US$799 for the body only or $899 with a new 18-55 mm F3.5-5.6 G AF-S DX lens. Another variant of the D50 kit containing both the 18–55 mm and a 55–200 mm F4-5.6 G AF-S DX lens was available. Competitors of the D50 included the Canon EOS 350D, the Pentax *ist DS, the Konica Minolta Dynax 5D, and the Olympus E-300.

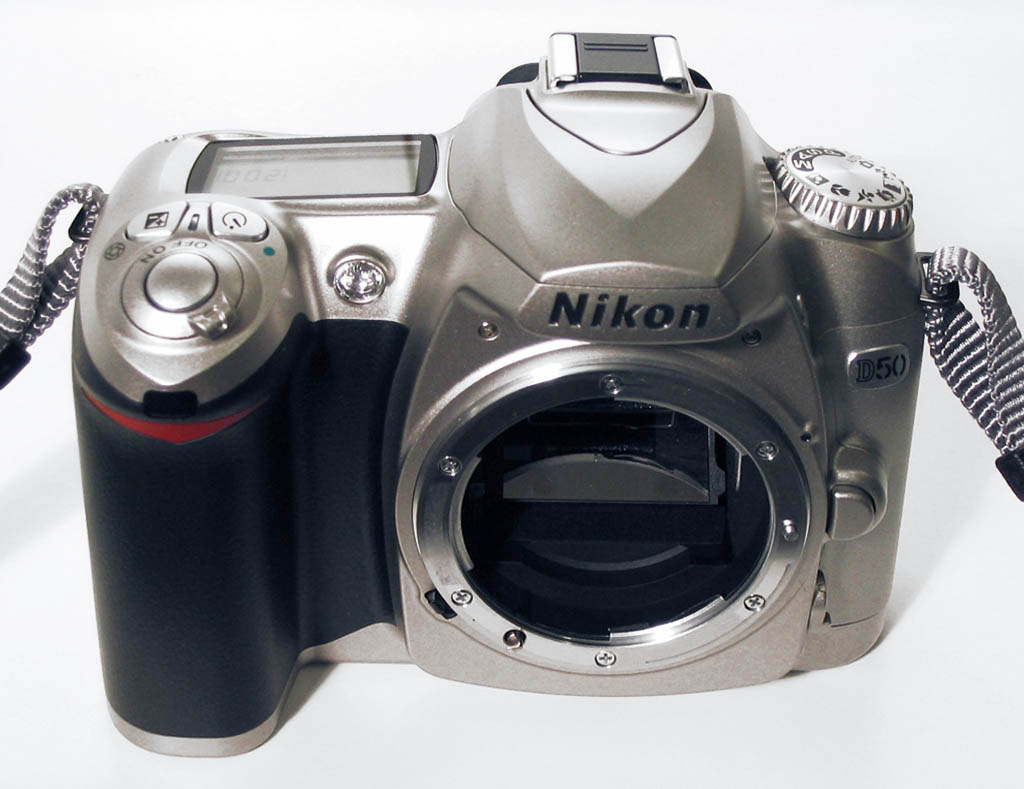
D50 body in silver.

The website Digital Photography Review rated the D50 highly and noted its improved noise performance over the D70s it was largely derived from, although it had fewer hobbyist features (making the D50 the first de-specified entry-level DSLR camera thus lowering the MSRP) and a lower price than the D70s. In depth testing by the Images Resources website and the October 2005 "Hoshi Nabi" (Star Navigator) Magazine, indicated that the D50 achieved its low noise through exceptionally good performance at the sensor level. Testing by Roger Clark confirmed that the D50 had higher gain and lower noise than the D70. Tests of the D50 at all ISO levels indicated that it did offer low noise without loss of contrast or detail.

| Sensor | Class | '99 | '00 | '01 | '02 | '03 | '04 | '05 | '06 | '07 | '08 | '09 | '10 | '11 | '12 | '13 | '14 | '15 | '16 | '17 | '18 | '19 | '20 | '21 | '22 | '23 | '24 | '25 | '26 |
|---|---|---|---|---|---|---|---|---|---|---|---|---|---|---|---|---|---|---|---|---|---|---|---|---|---|---|---|---|---|
| FX (Full-frame) | Flagship | | | | | | | | | | | D3X ^{−P} | | | | | | | | | | | | | | | | | |
| FX (Full-frame) | Flagship | | | | | | | | | | D3 ^{−P} | | D3S ^{−P} | | D4 | | D4S | | D5^{T} | | | | | D6^{T} | | | | | |
| FX (Full-frame) | Professional | | | | | | | | | | | D700 ^{−P} | | | D800/D800E | | | D810/D810A | | | D850 ^{AT} | | | | | | | | |
| FX (Full-frame) | Enthusiast | | | | | | | | | | | | | | | | Df | | | | | | | | | | | | |
| FX (Full-frame) | Enthusiast | | | | | | | | | | | | | | | | | D750 ^{A} | | | | | D780 ^{AT} | | | | | | |
| FX (Full-frame) | Enthusiast | | | | | | | | | | | | | | | D600 | D610 | | | | | | | | | | | | |
| DX (APS-C) | Flagship | | D1^{−E} | D1X^{−E} | | | | D2X^{−E} | | D2Xs^{−E} | | | | | | | | | | | | | | | | | | | |
| DX (APS-C) | Flagship | | D1^{−E} | D1H ^{−E} | | | D2H^{−E} | D2Hs^{−E} | | | | | | | | | | | | | | | | | | | | | |
| DX (APS-C) | Professional | | | | D100^{−E} | | | | D200^{−E} | | D300^{−P} | | D300S^{−P} | | | | | | D500 ^{AT} | | | | | | | | | | |
| DX (APS-C) | Enthusiast | | | | | | D70^{−E} | | D70s^{−E} | D80^{−E} | | D90^{−E} | | D7000 ^{−P} | | | D7100 | D7200 | | | D7500 ^{AT} | | | | | | | | |
| DX (APS-C) | Upper-entry | | | | | | | | D50^{−E} | D40X^{−E*} | D60^{−E*} | | D5000^{A−P*} | | D5100^{A−P*} | D5200^{A−P*} | D5300^{A*} | D5500^{AT*} | | D5600 ^{AT*} | | | | | | | | | |
| DX (APS-C) | Entry-level | | | | | | | | | D40^{−E*} | | | D3000^{−E*} | D3100^{−P*} | | D3200^{−P*} | D3300^{*} | | | D3400^{*} | | D3500^{*} | | | | | | | |
| Early models | | SVC (prototype; 1986); QV-1000C (1988); NASA F4 (1991); E2/E2S (1995); E2N/E2NS (1996); E3/E3S (1998) | | | | | | | | | | | | | | | | | | | | | | | | | | | |
| Sensor | Class | | | | | | | | | | | | | | | | | | | | | | | | | | | | |
| Sensor | Class | '99 | '00 | '01 | '02 | '03 | '04 | '05 | '06 | '07 | '08 | '09 | '10 | '11 | '12 | '13 | '14 | '15 | '16 | '17 | '18 | '19 | '20 | '21 | '22 | '23 | '24 | '25 | '26 |
