= Nikon D7000 =

Digital single-lens reflex camera

- Nikon D7000

Overview
- Maker: Nikon
- Type: Digital single-lens reflex camera
- Released: 15 September 2010

Lens
- Lens: Nikon F-mount

Sensor/medium
- Sensor: 23.6 × 15.6 mm Nikon DX format CMOS
- Maximum resolution: 4,928 × 3,264 (16.2 megapixels)
- Film speed: ISO 100–6400 (expandable to 25600)
- Recording medium: Dual SD, SDHC and SDXC card slots

Focusing
- Focus modes: AF-S, AF-C, AF-A, AF-F, Manual
- Focus areas: 39-point autofocus system

Exposure/metering
- Exposure modes: Auto, Scene, Program, Shutter-priority, Aperture-priority, Manual
- Exposure metering: TTL 3D Colour Matrix Metering II
- Metering modes: Matrix, Centre-weighted, Spot

Flash
- Flash: Built-in pop-up flash and Nikon Creative Lighting System support

Shutter
- Shutter: Electronically controlled vertical-travel focal-plane
- Shutter speed range: 30–1/8000 s, Bulb
- Continuous shooting: 6 fps

Viewfinder
- Viewfinder: Optical pentaprism
- Viewfinder magnification: 0.94×
- Frame coverage: 100%

Image processing
- White balance: Auto and preset white balance modes

General
- LCD screen: 3.0-inch, 921,000-dot TFT-LCD
- Battery: Nikon EN-EL15 lithium-ion
- Optional battery packs: Nikon MB-D11 battery grip
- Weight: 690 g (24 oz) (body only); 780 g with battery
- Made in: Thailand

Chronology
- Successor: Nikon D7100

References
- Nikon D7000 product homepage

The Nikon D7000 is a digital single-lens reflex camera (DSLR) produced by Nikon. It was announced on 15 September 2010, succeeding the Nikon D90 as Nikon's top-end consumer camera. The D7000 was superseded by the Nikon D7100 in 2013.

The D7000 features a magnesium alloy body construction and weather and moisture sealing in contrast to the D90. It also incorporates a 16.2 megapixel CMOS sensor, a 2,016-pixel color exposure meter, an upgraded autofocus system, increasing the number of focus points from 11 to 39, and a faster 6 fps burst rate. Other improvements include dual SD card slots, 1080p video recording, automatic correction of lateral chromatic aberration, and two user-customizable modes. The D7000 also introduces compatibility with older manual-focus AI and AI-S Nikon lenses and tilt-shift PC-E lenses.

Since its release, the Nikon D7000 received favourable reviews regarding image quality, robust build and advanced features for a mid-tier DSLR. In 2011, the camera won major awards such as the Red Dot Design Award, TIPA's "Best DSLR Advanced", EISA's "European Advanced SLR Camera", and Camera Grand Prix Japan's "Reader's Award".

== Release and discontinuation ==
A week before the Photokina 2010, Nikon, on 15 September 2010 in a press conference in Tokyo, officially announced the D7000 along with the lenses Nikon AF-S 200mm f/2G ED VR II, AF-S 35mm f/1.4G, and the flash SB-700 Speedlight. Nikon developed the camera to address concerns from D90 users who were unwilling to upgrade to the D300S because of its size, weight and price. Therefore, Nikon sought to combine the compactness of the D90 with the similar technical performance of the D300S in one camera. As a major upgrade, the D7000 also introduced 1080p video with the ability to autofocus while recording compared to the D90 only allowing manual focus.

The camera became available for purchase on October 29, aimed at photography enthusiasts. It was priced in Japan at ¥140,000 for the camera body only, ¥180,000 with the AF-S DX Nikkor 18-105mm f/3.5-5.6G ED VR kit lens, and ¥230,000 with the Nikkor AF-S DX 18–200mm f/3.5–5.6G IF-ED VR II lens. In the United States, it retailed at US$1,200 for the body only and US$1,500 with the kit lens. In the United Kingdom, the retail price was £1,100 for the camera model only and £1,299 with the kit lens.

The D7000 was produced at Nikon's factory in the Rojana Industrial Park in Ayutthaya Province, Thailand, its only production site along with other camera models. The plant alone accounted for 92% of Nikon's DSLR production and 66% of its lenses. During the 2011 Thailand floods, the factory was submerged and as a result operations were halted. They resumed in January 2012 while diverting some of the production at partner factories in Thailand.

The Nikon D7000 was succeeded by the D7100 on 21 February 2013.

== Feature list ==
- Sony IMX071 16.2 megapixel CMOS sensor, Nikon DX format with a pixel size of 4.78 μm.
- Nikon EXPEED 2 image/video processor.
- Full HD 1080p (at 24 frame/s) movie mode with auto-focus while filming, mono sound, and stereo external mic support. (30 frame/s or 25 frame/s or 24 frame/s when recording at 720p)
- Automatic correction of lateral chromatic aberration for JPEGs. Correction-data is additionally stored in RAW-files and can be used by Nikon Capture NX, View NX and some other RAW tools.
- Enhanced built-in RAW processing with extended Retouch menu for image processing without using a computer.
- Active D-Lighting and Active D-Lighting bracketing; also D-Lighting which can be applied to a JPEG using an Image Editing feature in Playback mode; Nikon Capture NX and View software include tools for applying D-Lighting to NEF format photos.
- Two user-customisable modes
- Many WB options including WB Bracketing and two auto white balance modes, one of which maintaining warm lighting colours
- 3-inch TFT LCD with 921,000-dot resolution (640×480 VGA) and 170-degree ultra-wide viewing angle with toughened glass screen
- Live View shooting mode (activated with a dedicated lever)
- Inbuilt time-lapse photography intervalometer
- Continuous Drive up to 6 frames per second for 100 JPEG frames (but not necessarily all at the same frame rate).
- Memory Buffer Capacity: Varies with image format, 10 image capacity in NEF (RAW) Lossless Compressed 14-bit format (Highest resolution available format) and can store up to 100 with JPEG.
- 2,016-pixel RGB 3D Color Matrix Metering II with Scene Recognition System.
- 3D Tracking Multi-CAM 4800DX autofocus sensor module with 39 AF points, including nine cross-type points.
- Face detection, Wide Area, Normal Area, and Subject Tracking autofocus options in live view mode.
- ISO sensitivity 100 to 6400 (up to 25600 with boost).
- Bracketing
- Dual SD memory card slots with support for SDXC cards, UHS-I bus, and Eye-Fi Wireless LAN
- Weather-resistant, sealed body that has Magnesium-alloy top and back panels.
- Built-in Sensor cleaning system
- Support for optional GPS unit direct connect.
- File formats: JPEG, NEF (Nikon's RAW, 12/14-bit also lossless compressed), MOV (H.264, PCM).
- EN-EL15 Lithium-ion Battery, Battery Life (shots per charge) approx.: 1,050 shots (CIPA).
- Lens compatibility: Nikkor F Mount, AF-S, AF-I, AF-D, Manual Nikkor AI/AIS (metering use built-in coupling on D7000)

=== Optional accessories ===
The Nikon D7000 has dozens of available accessories such as:

- Nikon WT-4A Wireless Transmitter for WLAN. Third-party solutions available.
- Nikon ML-L3 Wireless (Infrared) remote control or third-party solutions.
- Nikon GP-1 GPS Unit for direct GPS geotagging. Third-party solutions partly with 3-axis compass, data-logger, bluetooth and support for indoor use are available from Solmeta, Dawn, Easytag, Foolography, Gisteq and Phottix. See comparisons/reviews.
- Nikon MB-D11 Multi Power Battery grip or third-party solutions.
- Nikon CF-DC3 Soft Case.
- Various Nikon Speedlight or third-party flash units. Also working as commander for Nikon Creative Lighting System wireless (slave) flash.

Third-party radio (wireless) flash control triggers are partly supporting i-TTL, but do not support the Nikon Creative Lighting System (CLS). See reviews.

- Tethered shooting with Nikon Camera Control Pro 2, Adobe Lightroom 3 or other partly free products including apps.
- Other accessories from Nikon and third parties, including protective cases and bags, eyepiece adapters and correction lenses, and underwater housings.

== Reception ==
=== Reviews ===
Since its release, the D7000 has received many favorable reviews, with some commenting that the D7000 is a viable alternative to the more expensive D300S and an upgrade over the D90. Digital Photography Review awarded the camera an overall score of 80%, praising its feature set and image quality. The D7000 received four out of five stars and the Editor's choice award in CNET's review.

DxO Labs awarded its sensor an overall score of 80, above much more expensive competitors. The main point of criticism by reviewers is the small buffer which limits the number of shots in burst mode especially when shooting RAW.

There are image comparisons with many cameras at all ISO speeds in RAW.

=== Awards ===
In 2011, the Nikon D7000 won major awards such as the Red Dot Design Award, TIPA's "Best DSLR Advanced", EISA's "European Advanced SLR Camera", and Camera Grand Prix Japan's "Reader's Award".

=== Matrix Metering II and detected faces ===
The 3D Color Matrix Metering II tends to overexpose minor parts of the image (e.g. sky or bright back-lights) if it detects faces near the image center that are darker (e.g. in shadow) than these minor parts. This feature is sometimes surprising due to reliable scene recognition and face detection (including side-view of faces) of the new high-resolution sensor, even if there are only strangers (in the dark) near the image center.

If not wanted, the metering can be changed with exposure compensation, two-point (average) metering, metering on the bright lights or use of center-weighted or spot metering, fill flash or RAW images. Increasing the dynamic range by use of Active D-Lighting or reducing the contrast settings (the default contrast is higher compared to previous Nikon DSLRs) aids when shooting JPEGs. After taking the image, contrast and brightness can easily be changed in camera.

=== User response ===
The D7000 was very much anticipated by Nikon consumers. The hype around its release made it very hard to find during the first months on the market. Supplies of this camera were also limited after the destruction of some Nikon manufacturing facilities in Thailand by the flooding in October 2011. Many users have complained about back-focus problems on the D7000, as well as dust and oil spots on early production models

=== Firmware hacks ===
Several hacks have been published by Simeon Pilgrim on Nikon Hacker internet forum and Vitaliy Kiselev on his personal website. Nikon Hacker has several people working on the hacks. The published hacks, among few others, include removing the time limit for video recording, clean HDMI and LCD on LiveView, disabling automatic hot-pixel removal (also known as Nikon Star Eater) and higher data rate for video recording. Several other hacks are under development but not yet published.

In June 2013, Simeon Pilgrim was able to enable RAW video recording, but the frame rate (roughly 1.5 frames per second) is not high enough to be useful. The hack is not yet published.

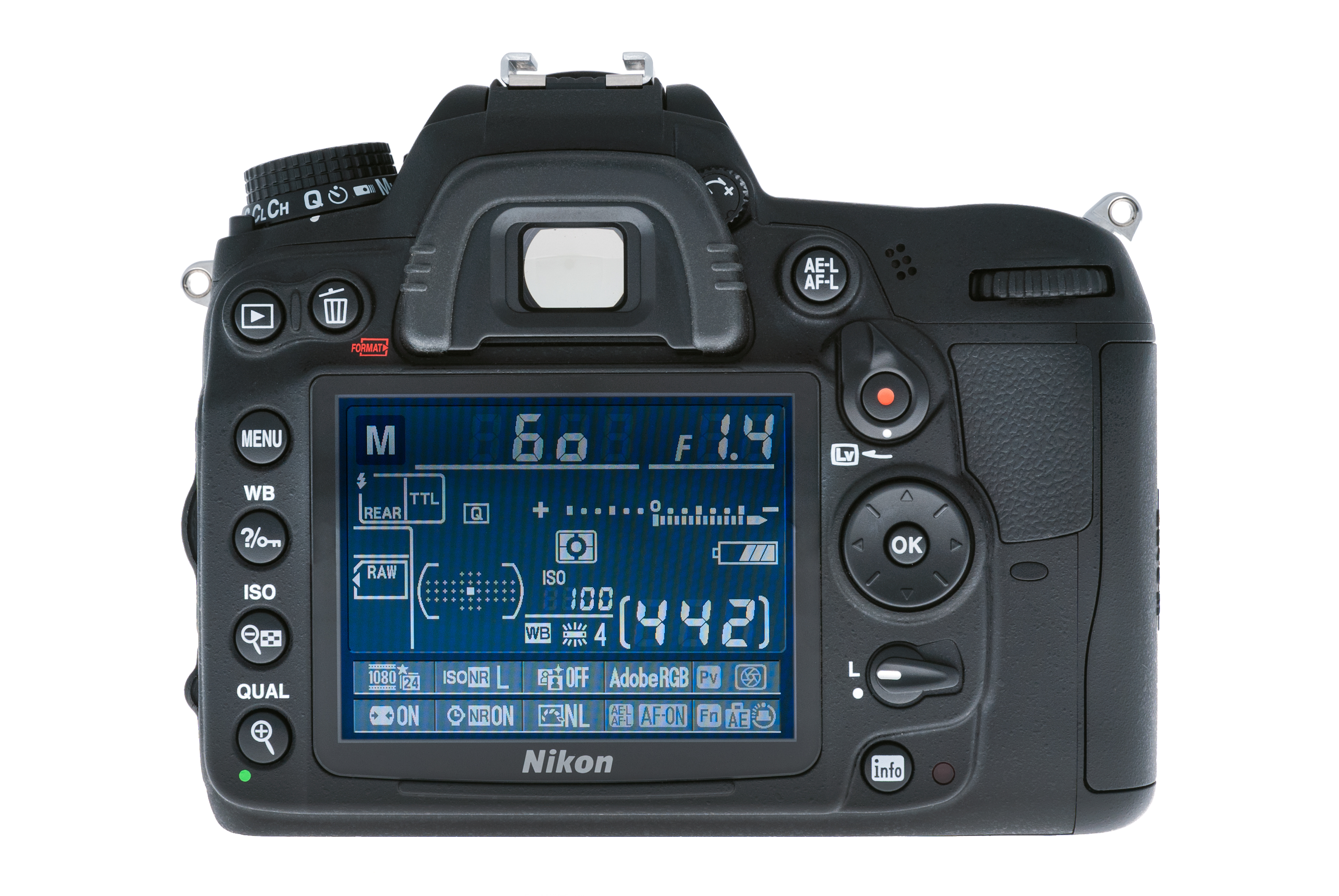
Rear

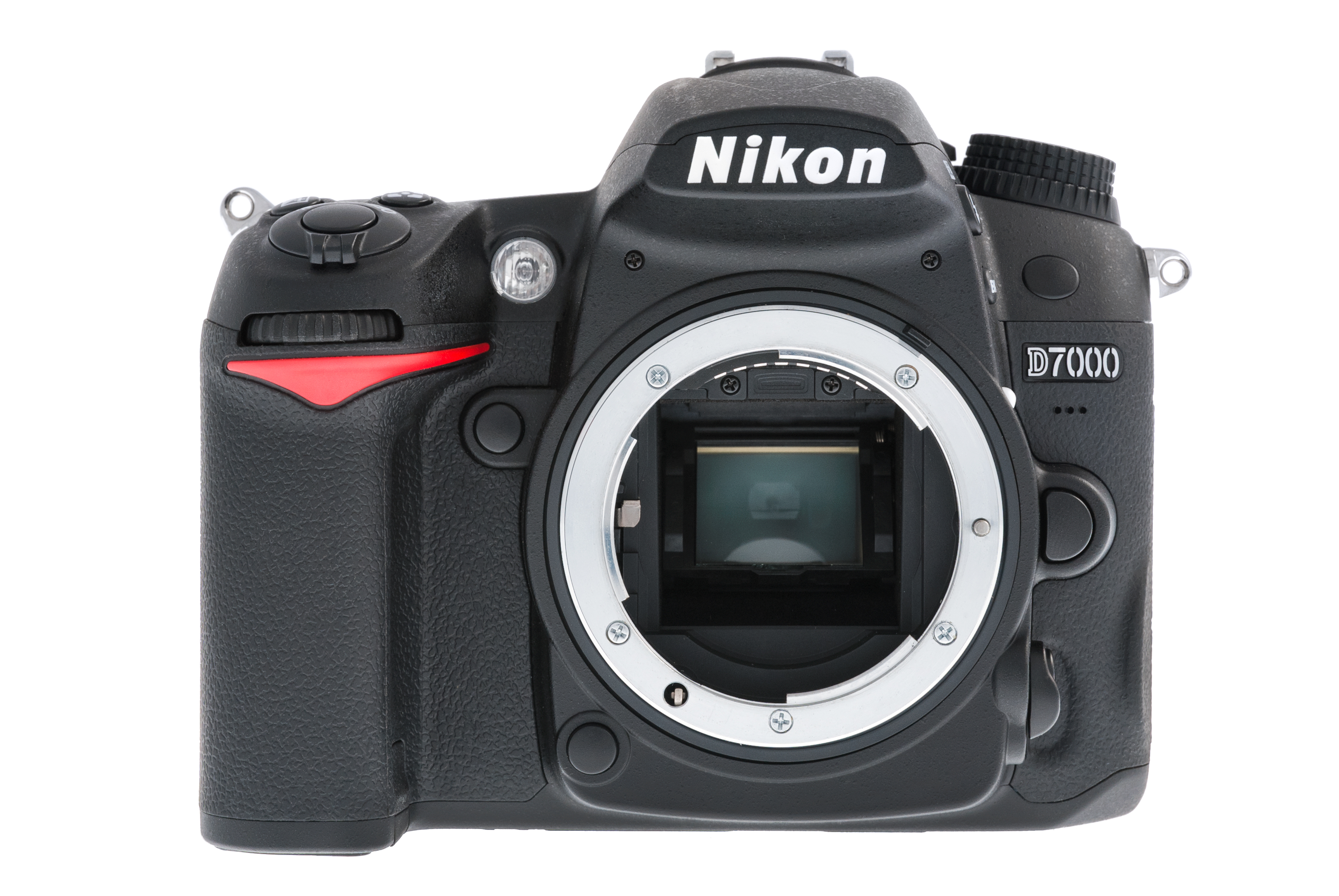
Open showing F-Mount

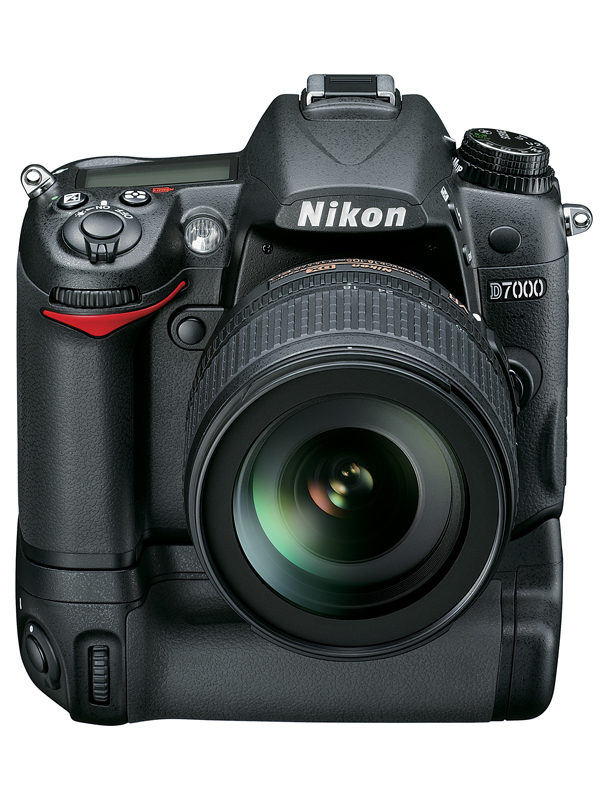
Mounted with MB-D11 Battery grip

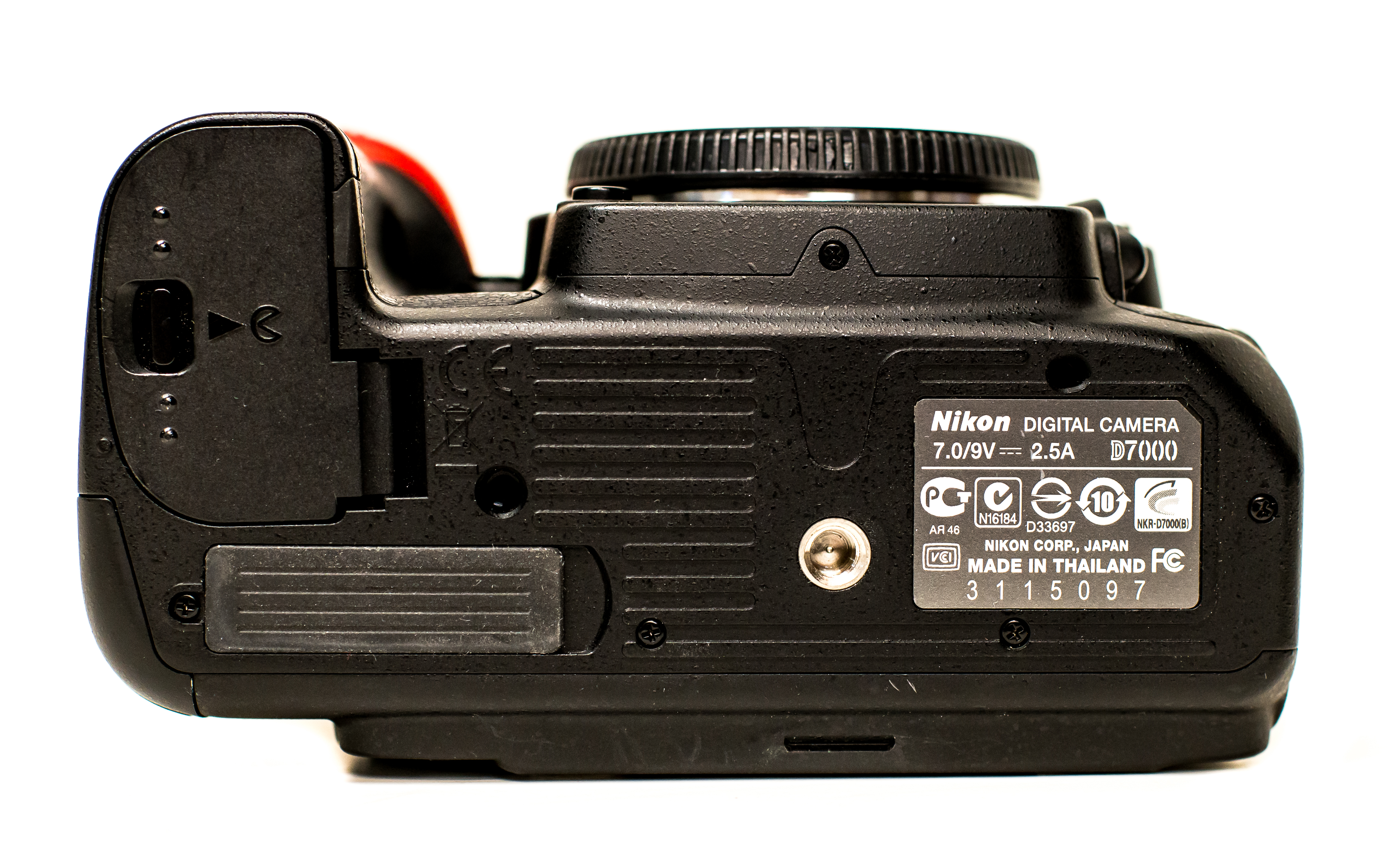
Nikon D7000 Digital Camera - bottom view

Sensor	Class	1999	2000	2001	2002	2003	2004	2005	2006	2007	2008	2009	2010	2011	2012	2013	2014	2015	2016	2017	2018	2019	2020	2021	2022	2023	2024	2025	2026
FX (Full-frame)	Flagship											D3X ^{−P}																	
FX (Full-frame)	Flagship										D3 ^{−P}		D3S ^{−P}		D4		D4S		D5^{T}					D6^{T}					
FX (Full-frame)	Professional											D700 ^{−P}			D800/D800E			D810/D810A			D850 ^{AT}								
FX (Full-frame)	Enthusiast																Df												
FX (Full-frame)	Enthusiast																	D750 ^{A}					D780 ^{AT}						
FX (Full-frame)	Enthusiast															D600	D610												
DX (APS-C)	Flagship		D1^{−E}	D1X^{−E}				D2X^{−E}		D2Xs^{−E}																			
DX (APS-C)	Flagship		D1^{−E}	D1H ^{−E}			D2H^{−E}	D2Hs^{−E}																					
DX (APS-C)	Professional				D100^{−E}				D200^{−E}		D300^{−P}		D300S^{−P}						D500 ^{AT}										
DX (APS-C)	Enthusiast						D70^{−E}		D70s^{−E}	D80^{−E}		D90^{−E}		D7000 ^{−P}			D7100	D7200			D7500 ^{AT}								
DX (APS-C)	Upper-entry								D50^{−E}	D40X^{−E*}	D60^{−E*}		D5000^{A−P*}		D5100^{A−P*}	D5200^{A−P*}	D5300^{A*}	D5500^{AT*}		D5600 ^{AT*}									
DX (APS-C)	Entry-level									D40^{−E*}			D3000^{−E*}	D3100^{−P*}		D3200^{−P*}	D3300^{*}			D3400^{*}		D3500^{*}							
Early models		SVC (prototype; 1986); QV-1000C (1988); NASA F4 (1991); E2/E2S (1995); E2N/E2NS (1996); E3/E3S (1998)																											
Sensor	Class																												
Sensor	Class	1999	2000	2001	2002	2003	2004	2005	2006	2007	2008	2009	2010	2011	2012	2013	2014	2015	2016	2017	2018	2019	2020	2021	2022	2023	2024	2025	2026
