= Nikon D70 =

2004 APS-C digital single-lens reflex camera

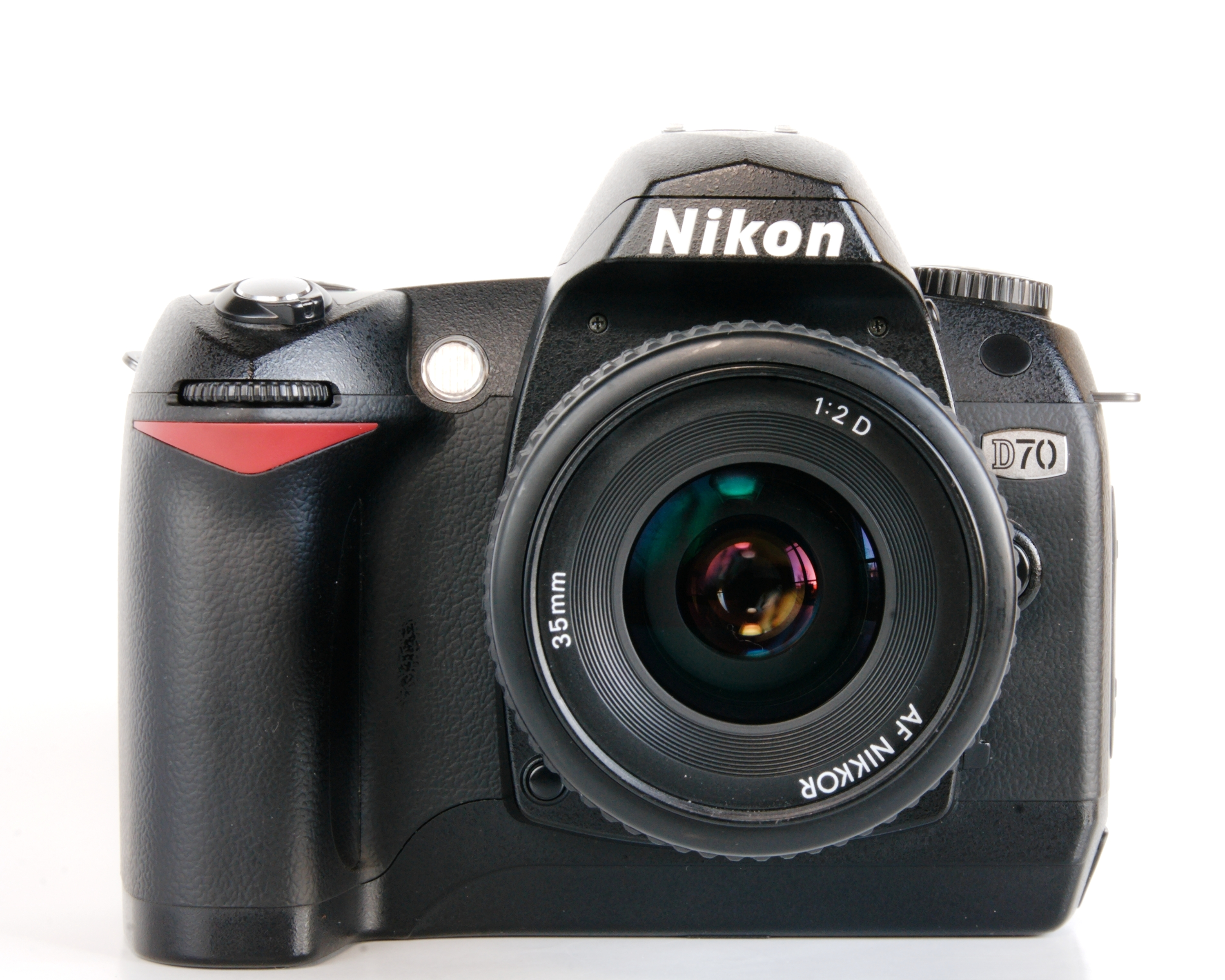

Overview
- Maker: Nikon
- Type: Digital single-lens reflex camera

Lens
- Lens mount: Nikon F-mount
- Lens: Interchangeable, Nikon F-mount

Sensor/medium
- Sensor: 6.1 megapixel 23.7 mm × 15.6 mm Nikon DX format RGB CCD sensor, 1.5 × FOV crop
- Maximum resolution: 3,008 × 2,000 (6.01 million)
- Film speed: 200 to 1600 (ISO equivalent) in steps of 1/3 EV manually or Auto ISO
- Recording medium: CompactFlash (Type I or Type II) or Microdrive

Focusing
- Focus modes: Single Area AF, Dynamic Area AF, Closest Subject Priority Dynamic Area AF
- Focus areas: Can be selected from 5 focus areas

Exposure/metering
- Exposure modes: Digital Vari-Program (Auto, Portrait, Landscape, Close up, Sports, Night landscape, Night portrait), Programmed Auto [P] with flexible program; Shutter Priority Auto [S]; Aperture Priority Auto [A]; Manual [M]
- Exposure metering: 1,005 segment color meter, EV 0 to 20 (3D Color Matrix or center-weighted metering); EV 2 to 20 (spot metering)
- Metering modes: Matrix, Center-weighted, Spot

Shutter
- Shutter: Combined mechanical and CCD electronic shutter
- Shutter speed range: 30 s to 1/8000 s in steps of 1/3 or 1/2 EV, bulb
- Continuous shooting: 3 frame/s up to 144 frames (JPEG/RAW)

Viewfinder
- Viewfinder: Pentamirror type, 0.75× magnification, 95% coverage

General
- LCD screen: 1.8 in or 46 mm (D70), 2.0 in or 51 mm (D70s), 130,000 pixel TFT
- Battery: Nikon EN-EL3e Lithium-Ion battery
- Weight: no battery 595 g (21.0 oz), inc. batt 679 g (1.497 lb)
- Made in: Thailand

The Nikon D70 is a digital single-lens reflex camera, introduced at the 2004 PMA Annual Convention and Trade Show, as Nikon's first consumer-level digital SLR, and a competitor to the Canon EOS 300D. It was often sold in a "kit package" with the Nikon 18-70mm AF-S lens. The Nikon D70 was succeeded initially by the Nikon D70s and eventually by the Nikon D80 and Nikon D90, announced on August 9, 2006 and August 27, 2008 respectively. The Nikon D70 is the first DSLR camera built by Nikon's factory in Thailand. It debuted at a price of US$999.

== Features ==
The D70 features include:

- Nikon DX format sensor
- 1.5x field of view crop
- 6.1 megapixel sensor (23.7 mm × 15.6 mm)
- 1/500th second x-sync
- Nikon F-mount lenses
- File formats include JPEG, NEF (Nikon's raw image format), and JPEG+NEF
- Single Servo and Continuous Servo focus modes
- Continuous shooting at 3 frame/s up to 144 images using a high-speed storage card (minimum burst of 4 images with a low-speed storage card)
- ISO 200–1600 (in full stops or 1/3 stops selectable)
- Configurable Auto-ISO (Automatic sensitivity change to keep required Shutter and/or Aperture values)
- New TTL Flash System

Due to its hybrid electronic/mechanical shutter, it is possible to flash synchronize the D70 and D70s beyond their published 1/500 maximum synchronization speed up to the maximum shutter speed of 1/8000.

The Nikon D70 has been considered superior to its predecessor, the D100, despite the higher price of the latter. The D70 is backward compatible with most of the older Nikkor lenses. Sigma, Tokina and Tamron are other popular lens suppliers of Nikon F-mount lenses.

== D70s ==
In early 2005 Nikon announced the D70s. The D70s is essentially an update of the D70, adding a larger LCD screen (2 inches or 51 millimetres instead of 1.8 inches or 46 millimetres), though still having 130,000 pixels. The D70s also comes with the newer EN-EL3a battery with slightly higher capacity. While the battery performance is increased, the new version of the D70 lacks the previously included MS-D70 battery holder, which allowed users to mount three CR2 batteries in the camera in case of a dead battery (notably the adapter is not compatible with CR123 batteries). The camera is also equipped with a terminal for a proprietary remote release cable (MC-DC1).

In addition, the D70s features an increased 18 mm angle of coverage from its built-in flash; the flash on the D70 could only be used with lenses as wide as 20 mm. All other updates to the D70s are available for the D70 through a firmware update, which include improved auto-focus performance, updated menu design and updated in-camera printer support.

The Canon EOS 350D (known as the Digital Rebel XT in the US) was its then-competitor when the D70s was introduced.

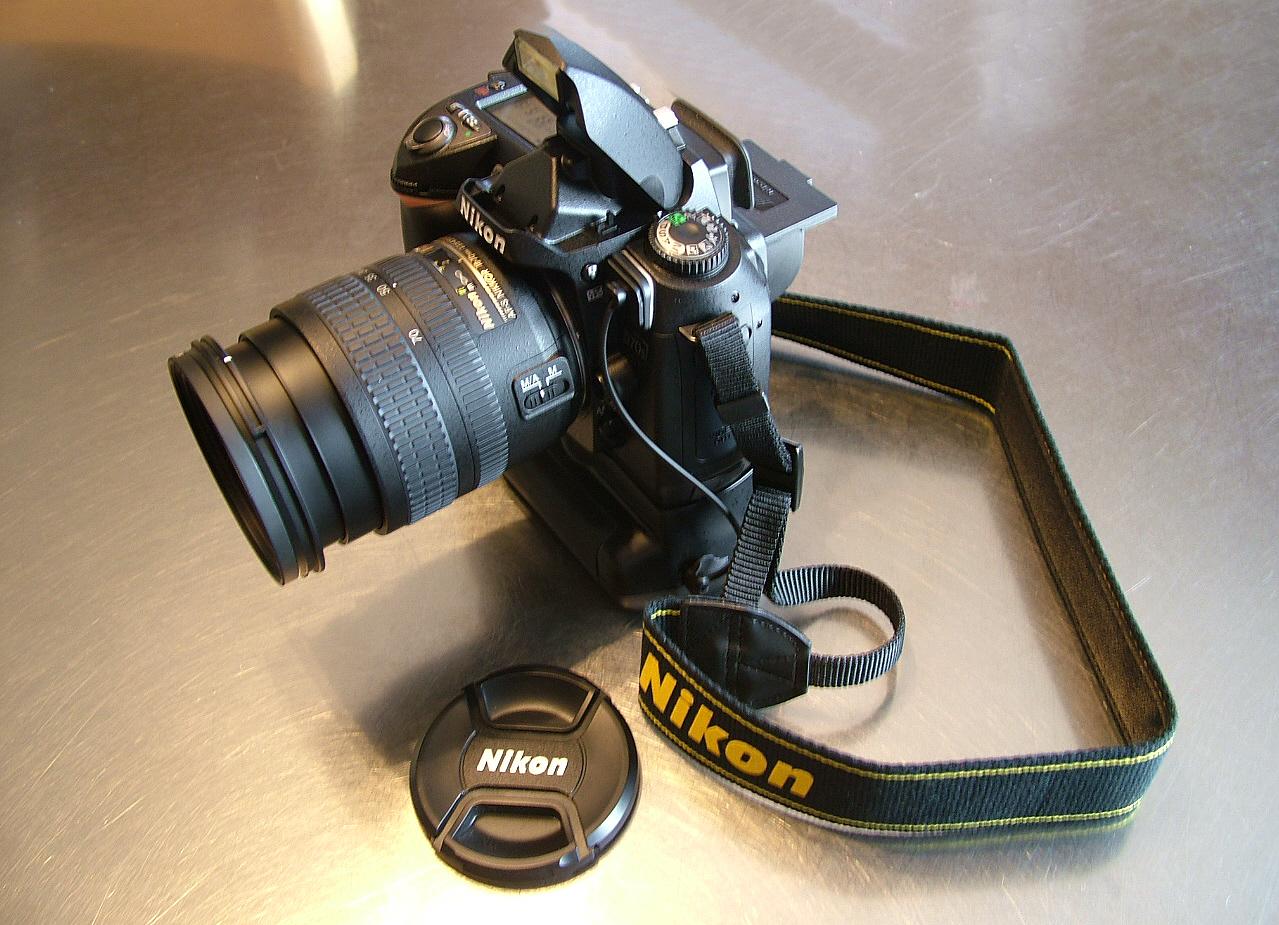
A Nikon D70s with third-party vertical grip and display hood.

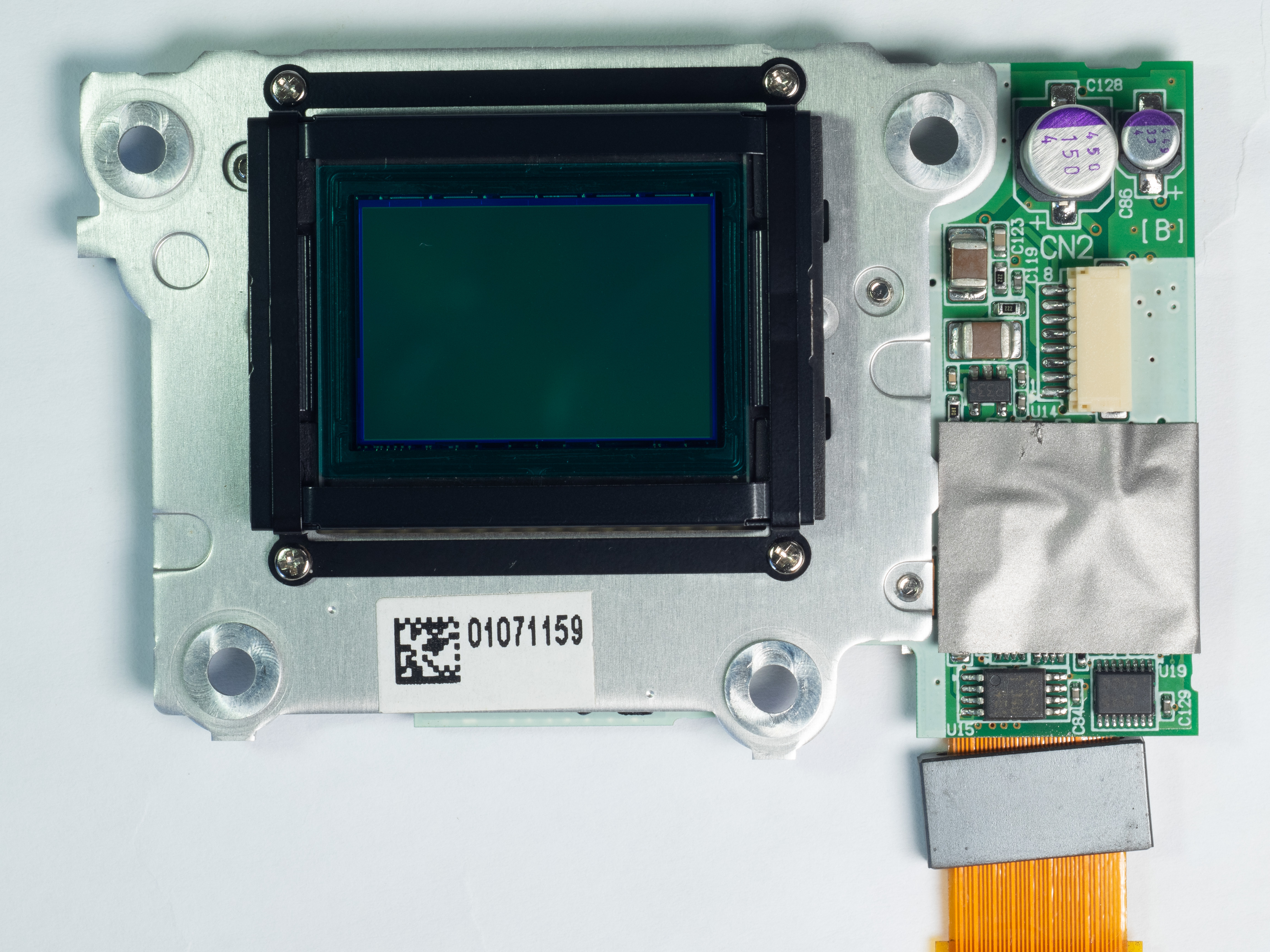
6 MP CCD sensor of Nikon D70s.

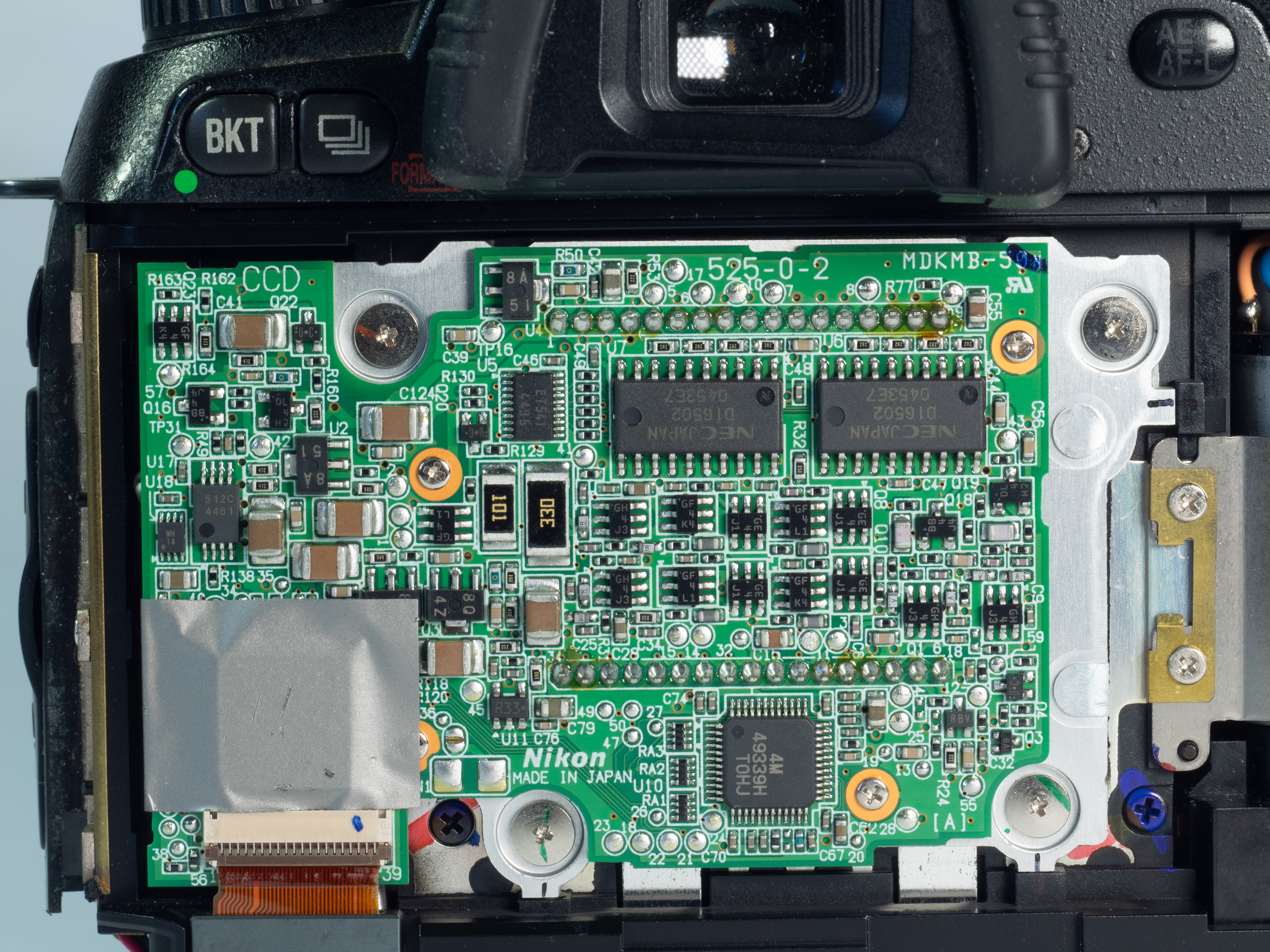
Internal view of Nikon D70s showing circuit board.

== Cultural references ==
- In the TV show Veronica Mars, Veronica, the main character, uses a Nikon Coolpix 8800 throughout season one, and a Nikon D70 DSLR in all other seasons.

== See also ==
- Nikon EXPEED

Sensor	Class	'99	'00	'01	'02	'03	'04	'05	'06	'07	'08	'09	'10	'11	'12	'13	'14	'15	'16	'17	'18	'19	'20	'21	'22	'23	'24	'25	'26
FX (Full-frame)	Flagship											D3X ^{−P}																	
FX (Full-frame)	Flagship										D3 ^{−P}		D3S ^{−P}		D4		D4S		D5^{T}					D6^{T}					
FX (Full-frame)	Professional											D700 ^{−P}			D800/D800E			D810/D810A			D850 ^{AT}								
FX (Full-frame)	Enthusiast																Df												
FX (Full-frame)	Enthusiast																	D750 ^{A}					D780 ^{AT}						
FX (Full-frame)	Enthusiast															D600	D610												
DX (APS-C)	Flagship		D1^{−E}	D1X^{−E}				D2X^{−E}		D2Xs^{−E}																			
DX (APS-C)	Flagship		D1^{−E}	D1H ^{−E}			D2H^{−E}	D2Hs^{−E}																					
DX (APS-C)	Professional				D100^{−E}				D200^{−E}		D300^{−P}		D300S^{−P}						D500 ^{AT}										
DX (APS-C)	Enthusiast						D70^{−E}		D70s^{−E}	D80^{−E}		D90^{−E}		D7000 ^{−P}			D7100	D7200			D7500 ^{AT}								
DX (APS-C)	Upper-entry								D50^{−E}	D40X^{−E*}	D60^{−E*}		D5000^{A−P*}		D5100^{A−P*}	D5200^{A−P*}	D5300^{A*}	D5500^{AT*}		D5600 ^{AT*}									
DX (APS-C)	Entry-level									D40^{−E*}			D3000^{−E*}	D3100^{−P*}		D3200^{−P*}	D3300^{*}			D3400^{*}		D3500^{*}							
Early models		SVC (prototype; 1986); QV-1000C (1988); NASA F4 (1991); E2/E2S (1995); E2N/E2NS (1996); E3/E3S (1998)																											
Sensor	Class																												
Sensor	Class	'99	'00	'01	'02	'03	'04	'05	'06	'07	'08	'09	'10	'11	'12	'13	'14	'15	'16	'17	'18	'19	'20	'21	'22	'23	'24	'25	'26
