= Nikon AF-S DX Nikkor 18-105mm f/3.5-5.6G ED VR =

Superzoom lens

AF-S DX Nikkor 18-105mm f/3.5–5.6G ED VR
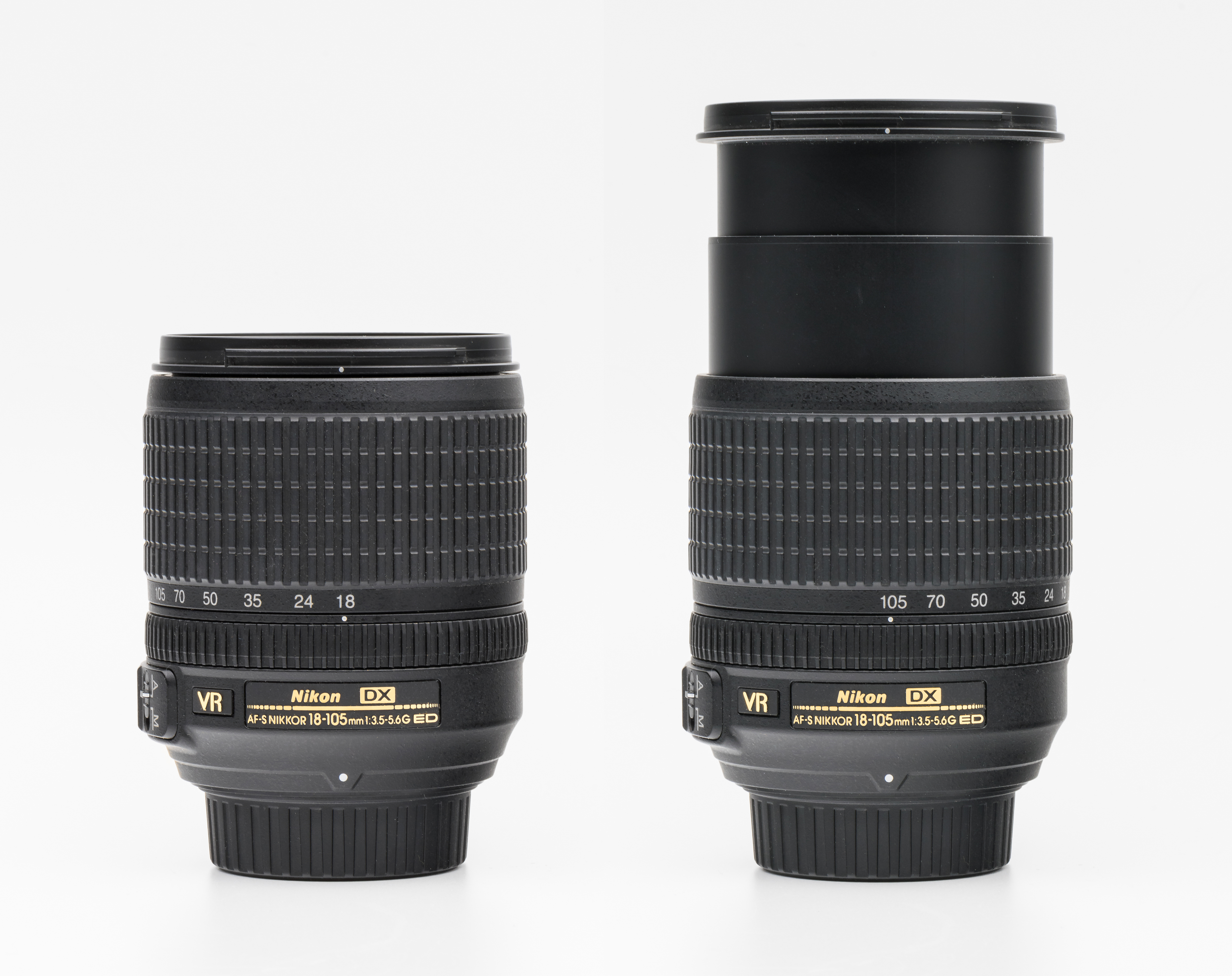
- Compact and fully extended
- Maker: Nikon
- Lens mount(s): F-mount

Technical data
- Type: Zoom
- Focus drive: Silent wave motor
- Focal length: 18-105mm
- Focal length (35mm equiv.): 27-157.7mm
- Image format: DX (APS-C)
- Aperture (max/min): f/3.5–22 (wide) f/5.6–38 (tele)
- Close focus distance: 0.45m
- Max. magnification: 1:6.2
- Diaphragm blades: 7 (rounded)
- Construction: 15 elements in 11 groups

Features
- Lens-based stabilization: Yes Yes
- Macro capable: No No
- Aperture ring: No No
- Application: Superzoom

Physical
- Max. length: 89 mm (@ 18mm)
- Diameter: 76 mm
- Weight: 420 g
- Filter diameter: 67mm

Accessories
- Lens hood: HB-32
- Case: CL-1018

Angle of view
- Diagonal: 76° - 15°20°

History
- Introduction: August 2008

The AF-S DX Nikkor 18-105mm f/3.5–5.6G ED VR is a superzoom lens manufactured by Nikon, introduced in August 2008 for use on Nikon DX format digital SLR cameras. This lens is sold as a kit lens for the Nikon D90, Nikon D7000, Nikon D5100, Nikon D5200 and Nikon D3200 cameras, but it also can be purchased separately from the camera body.

The lens includes vibration reduction to counter camera shake. To minimize chromatic aberrations the lens uses an extra-low dispersion glass element. The lens uses internal focusing and a silent wave motor to focus. Two switches are provided on the lens. One of them can be used to switch vibration reduction on/off and the other is used to switch between auto-focus and manual focus. Like all lenses in the DX format, the 18-105mm casts a smaller image circle than lenses for full-frame 35mm cameras and is therefore only compatible with cameras having APS-C-sized sensors (or vignetting will result).

There is no distance scale and, being a G lens, the AF-S 18-105 VR does not feature an aperture ring.

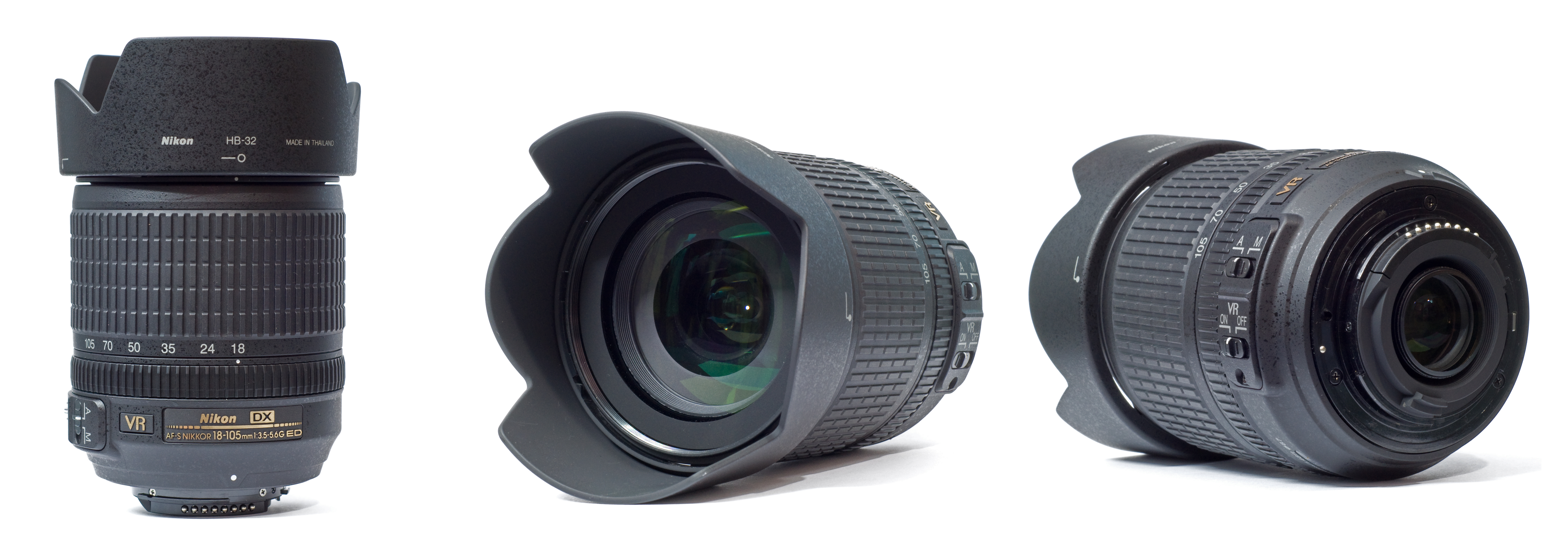
Three views of the lens with hood.

== Performance ==
Digital Photography Review praised its high performance saying "The wide zoom range makes it suitable for shooting buildings and scenery while the telephoto zoom range is ideal for portraits".

== See also ==
- List of Nikon compatible lenses with integrated autofocus-motor
- Nikon F-mount
