= Nikon F 80-200mm lens =

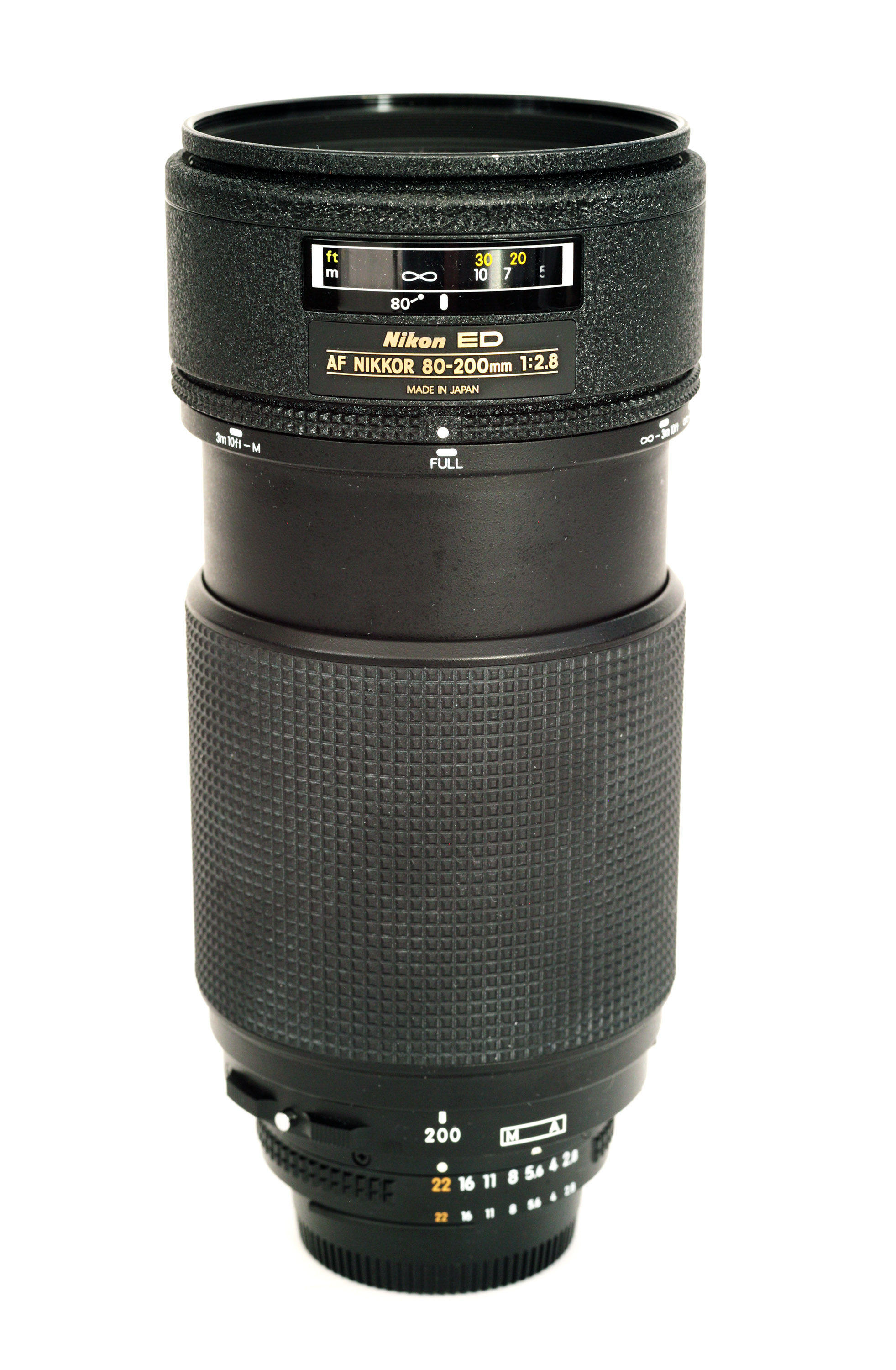
A Nikon 80-200mm f/2.8 ED zoom lens (1988)

Nikon F 80-200mm lens refers to several generations of single-lens reflex telephoto zoom lenses for made by Japanese camera manufacturer Nikon.

== Overview ==
Nikon has manufactured nine different zoom lenses with a focal-length range of 80 to 200 mm range for its F-mount 35mm film cameras and its digital SLR lineup. They were all released during the film camera era, but are compatible with Nikon's subsequent digital SLRs. All lenses have a push-pull design except where noted:

- Zoom-NIKKOR Auto 80-200mm f/4.5 (1969)
- AI Zoom-NIKKOR 80-200mm f/4.5 N (1977)
- AI-S Zoom-NIKKOR 80-200mm f/4 (1981)
- AI-S Zoom-NIKKOR*ED 80-200mm f/2.8 (1982)
- AF Zoom-NIKKOR 80-200mm f/2.8 ED (1988, pictured)
- AF Zoom-NIKKOR 80-200mm f/2.8D ED (1992)
- AF Zoom-NIKKOR 80-200mm f/2.8D ED N (1997, two-ring)
- AF Zoom-NIKKOR 80-200mm f/4.5-5.6D (1995, two-ring)
- AF-S Zoom-NIKKOR 80-200mm f/2.8D IF-ED (1998, two-ring)

All models are out of production, including the latest "AF-S Zoom-NIKKOR 80-200mm f/2.8D IF-ED". Instead, Nikon has released a range of new lenses in a similar focal length, such as the AF-S VR 70-200mm f/2.8G lens in 2003. The new lenses include Internal focusing (IF), vibration reduction (VR), and a fully-electronic control system which does without the traditional aperture control ring (G).

== Specifications ==
Attribute	Auto f/4.5	AI f/4.5 N	AI-S f/4	AI-S ED f/2.8	AF f/2.8 ED	AF f/2.8D ED	AF f/2.8D ED N	AF f/4.5-5.6D	AF-S f/2.8D IF-ED
AF	No No				Yes Yes				
Silent Wave Motor	No No								Yes Yes
Maximum aperture	f/4.5		f/4.0	f/2.8				f/4.5-5.6	f/2.8
Minimum aperture	f/32				f/22			f/32	f/22
Weight	880 g 1.94 lb	750 g 1.65 lb	810 g 1.79 lb	1,900 g 4.2 lb	1,200 g 2.6 lb		1,300 g 2.9 lb	300 g 0.66 lb	1,580 g 3.48 lb
Maximum diameter	74.5 mm 2.93 in	73 mm 2.9 in		99 mm 3.9 in	85.5 mm 3.37 in	87 mm 3.4 in		72 mm 2.8 in	88 mm 3.5 in
Length	162 mm 6.4 in			223 mm 8.8 in	184.5 mm 7.26 in	185 mm 7.3 in	187 mm 7.4 in	87.5 mm 3.44 in	187 mm 7.4 in
Filter diameter	52mm		62mm	96mm	77mm			52mm	77mm
Horizontal viewing angle	25.4 - 10.3°								
Vertical viewing angle	17.1 - 6.9°								
Diagonal viewing angle	30.3 - 12.3°								
Groups/elements	10/15	9/12	9/13	11/15	11/16			8/10	14/18
# of diaphragm blades	7		9					7	9
Closest focusing distance	1.8 m 5.9 ft		1.2 m 3.9 ft	2.5 m 8.2 ft	1.4 m 4.6 ft			1.5 m 4.9 ft	
Release date	1969	1977	1981	1982	1988	1992	1997	1995	1998
Patent(s)									
MSRP $									
Citations									

== Photos ==
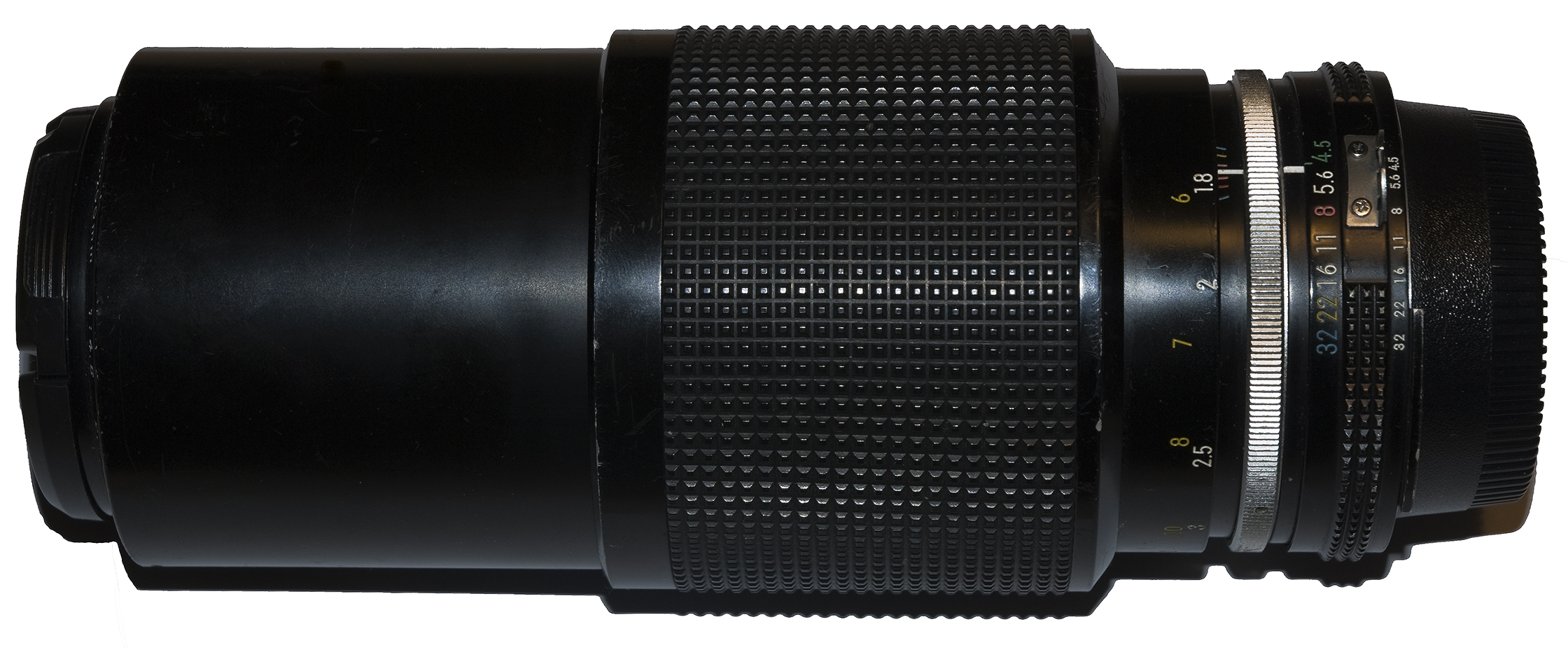
AI Zoom-NIKKOR 80-200mm f/4.5 N

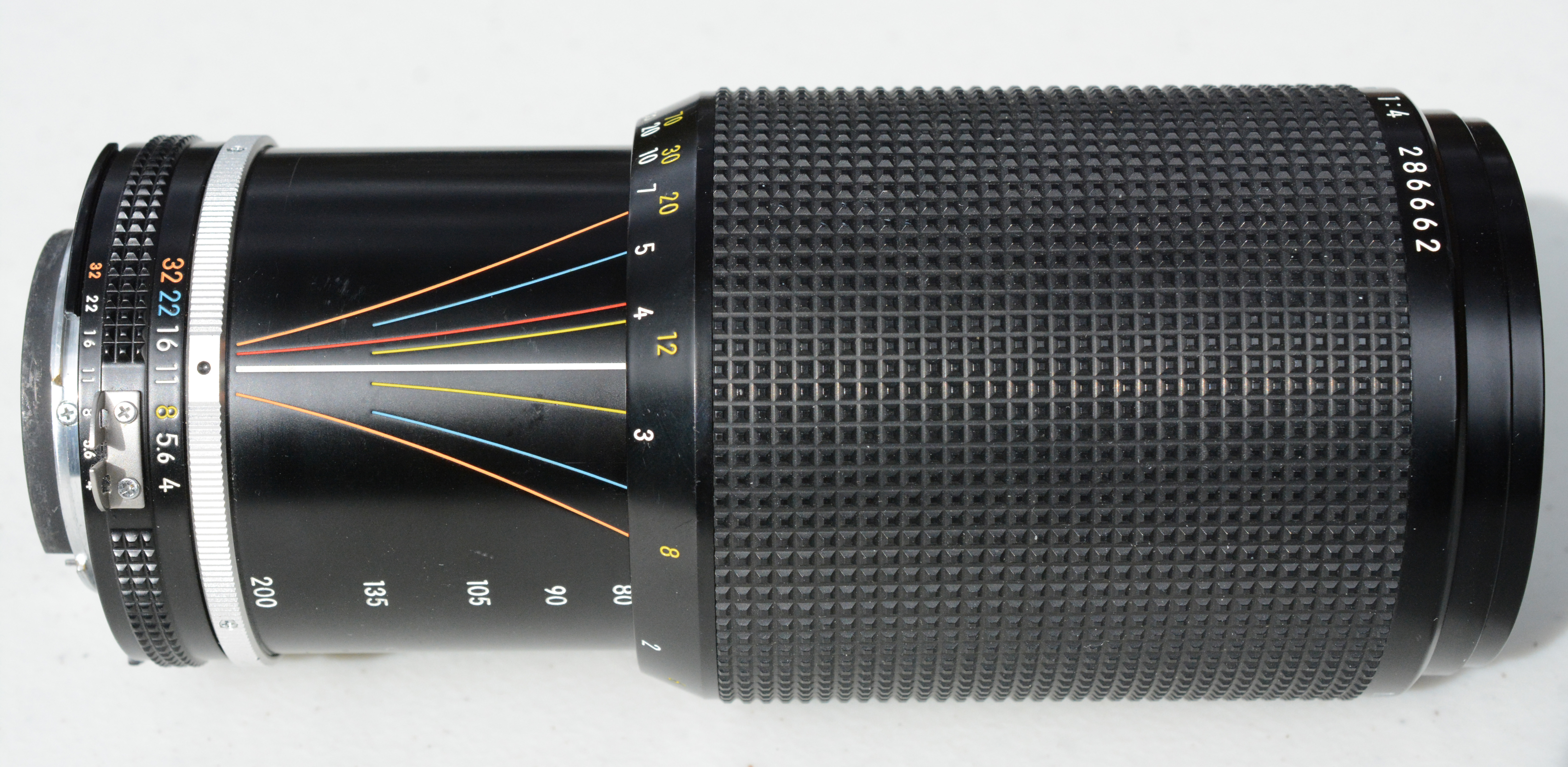
Nikon 80-200mm f/4 push-pull zoom lens, manual focus

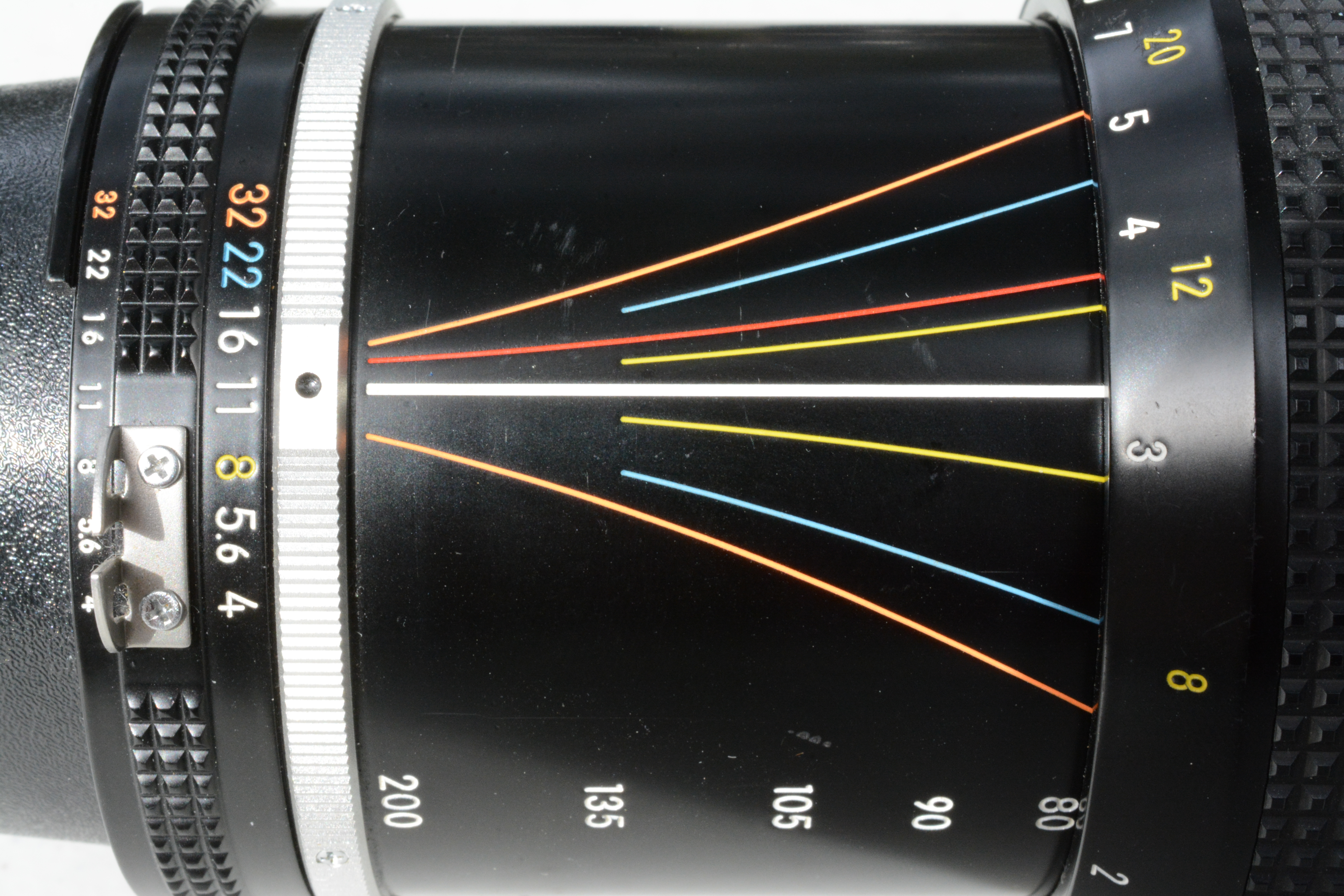
Close up of Nikon 80-200 f/4 zoom lens showing the color-coded depth-of-field lines

== See also ==
- Nikon F-mount
- List of Nikon compatible lenses with integrated autofocus-motor
- Nikon F 70-210mm lens
- Canon EF 70–200mm lens
