= Nikon D80 =

2006 DX-format digital single-lens reflex camera

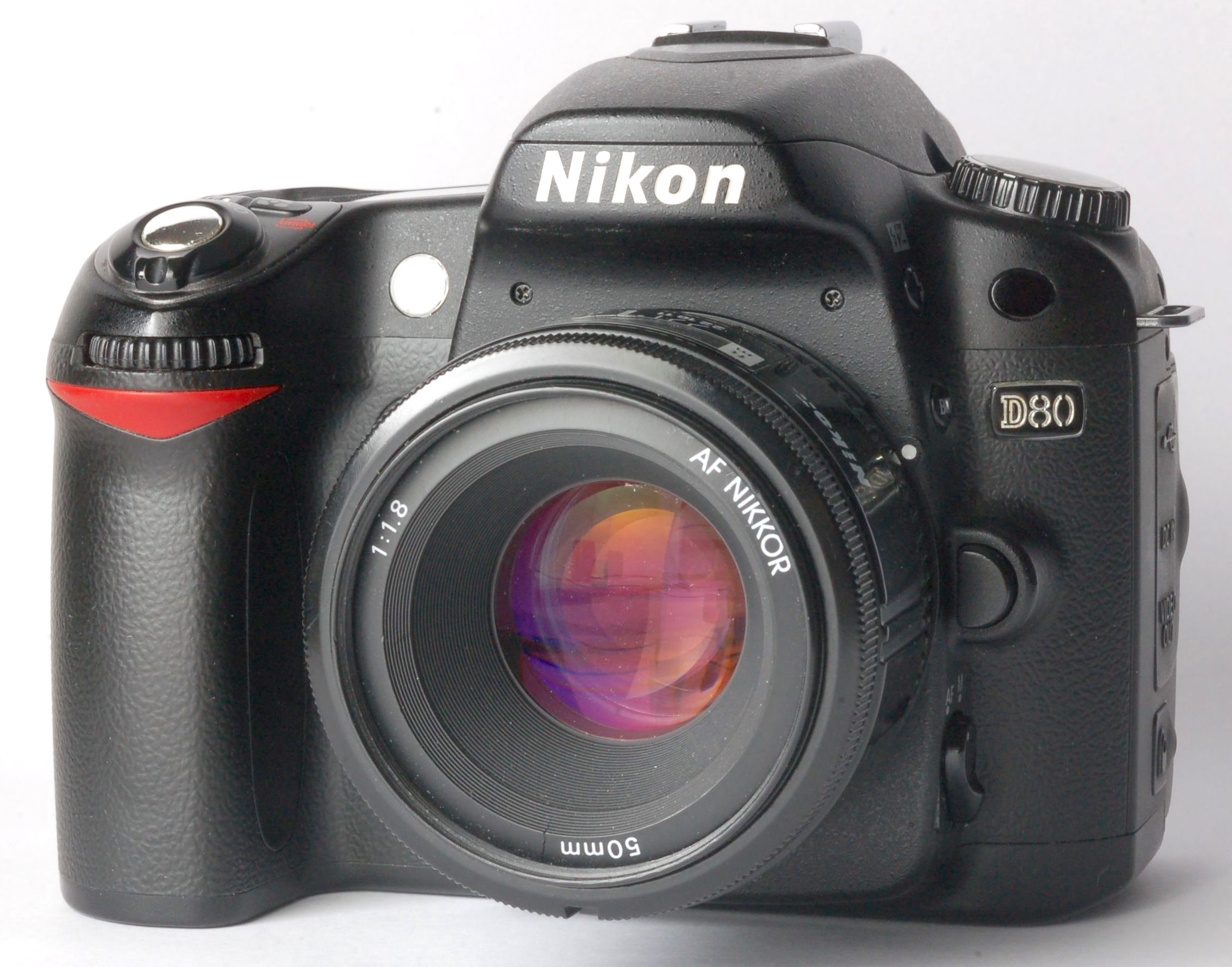

Overview
- Maker: Nikon
- Type: Digital single-lens reflex

Lens
- Lens: Interchangeable, Nikon F-mount

Sensor/medium
- Sensor: 23.6 mm × 15.8 mm Nikon DX format RGB CCD sensor, 1.5 × FOV crop
- Maximum resolution: 3,872 × 2,592 (10.2 effective megapixels)
- Film speed: 100–1600 in 1/2 or 1/3 EV steps, up to 3200 as boost
- Recording medium: Secure Digital, SDHC compatible

Focusing
- Focus modes: Instant single-servo (AF-S); continuous-servo (AF-C); auto AF-S/AF-C selection (AF-A); manual (M)
- Focus areas: 11-area AF system, Multi-CAM 1000 AF Sensor Module

Exposure/metering
- Exposure modes: Programmed Auto [P] with flexible program; Shutter-Priority Auto [S]; Aperture Priority Auto [A]; Manual [M]
- Exposure metering: TTL 3D Color Matrix Metering II metering with a 420-pixel RGB sensor
- Metering modes: 3D Color Matrix Metering II, Center-weighted and Spot

Flash
- Flash: Built in Pop-up, Guide number 13m at ISO 100, Standard ISO hotshoe, Compatible with the Nikon Creative Lighting System

Shutter
- Shutter: Electronically controlled vertical-travel focal-plane shutter
- Shutter speed range: 30 s to 1/4000 s and Bulb, 1/200 s X-sync
- Continuous shooting: 3 frame/s up to 100 JPEG or 6 RAW images

Viewfinder
- Viewfinder: Optical 0.94× Pentaprism

Image processing
- White balance: Auto, Incandescent, Fluorescent, Sunlight, Flash, Cloudy, Shade, Kelvin temperature, Preset

General
- LCD screen: 2.5-inch (64 mm) TFT LCD, 230,000 pixels
- Battery: Nikon EN-EL3e Lithium-Ion battery
- Optional battery packs: MB-D80 battery pack (with vertical shutter release) with one or two Nikon EN-EL3e or six AA batteries
- Weight: Approx. 585 g (1.290 lb) without battery, memory card, body cap, or monitor cover
- Made in: Thailand

Chronology
- Predecessor: Nikon D70S
- Successor: Nikon D90

The Nikon D80 is a digital single-lens reflex camera model announced by Nikon on August 9, 2006. The camera shipped the first week of September to US retailers. Considered by many to be a hybrid of design elements of the entry-level D50 and high-end D200 cameras, it occupied the same price bracket the Nikon D70 did at the time of its release. It was replaced by the Nikon D90 in August 2008.

== Features ==
- 10.2 Megapixel CCD sensor
- Seven preset scene modes (Auto, Portrait, Landscape, Macro, Sports, Night Landscape and Night Portrait) selectable using a top-mounted dial
- User-selectable image optimization options (Normal, Softer, Vivid, More vivid, Portrait, Custom and Black-and-white)
- In-camera Retouch feature with D-Lighting, Red-eye correction, Trim, Image overlay, Monochrome and Filter effects
- In-camera Multiple exposure feature (merges up to three consecutive images)
- USB 2.0 Hi-speed interface
- Pentaprism viewfinder, rather than the more compact penta-mirror set up (0.94× magnification vs. 0.8× for the D40x). Same one on D200.
- 2.5 inch, 230,000 pixel LCD monitor (same as in D40, D40x and D200).
- Internal screw-drive focus motor of prior autofocus film and digital SLRs (suitable for the use of autofocus with late film-era Nikkor AF and AF-D lenses).

The Nikon D80 also inherits some of the D200's features such as the 10.2 MP image sensor, albeit with slower data throughput than the D200. The D80 is the second Nikon DSLR to use the SD card (the D50 being the first), rather than the CF card storage used in the D70, D70s and D200 and higher-end models. The higher storage capacity SDHC standard is also supported.

=== Optional accessories ===
- Wireless ML-L3 (IR) remote control and MC-DC1 remote cord
- Battery MB-D80 battery grip. Cheaper after-market clones exist.

=== Firmware ===
The last firmware set was released September 24 2008. v1.11 is the last version number for the A and B firmware. As of August 2018, it is available on the Nikon support site. The last firmware release coincides with the release of the D90, the replacement of the D80.

=== Images ===
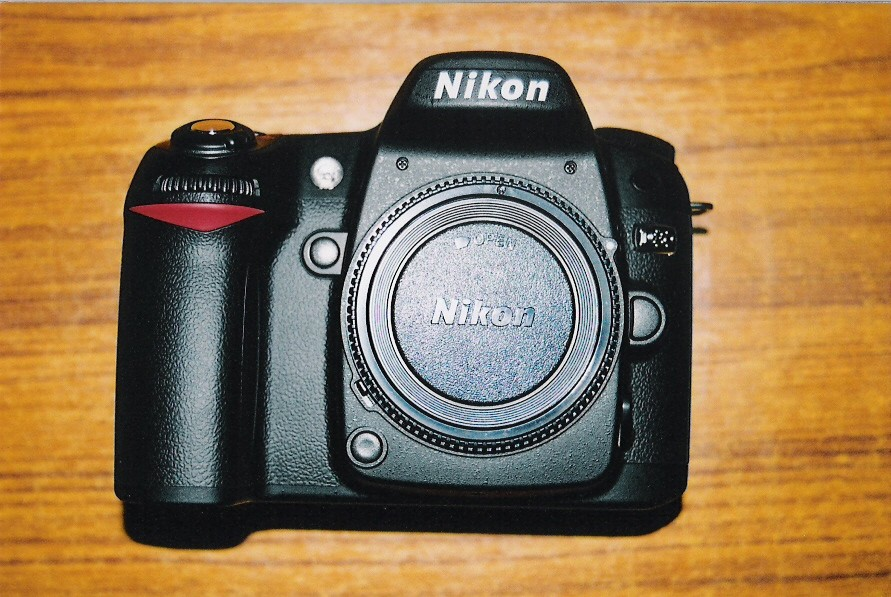
D80 body

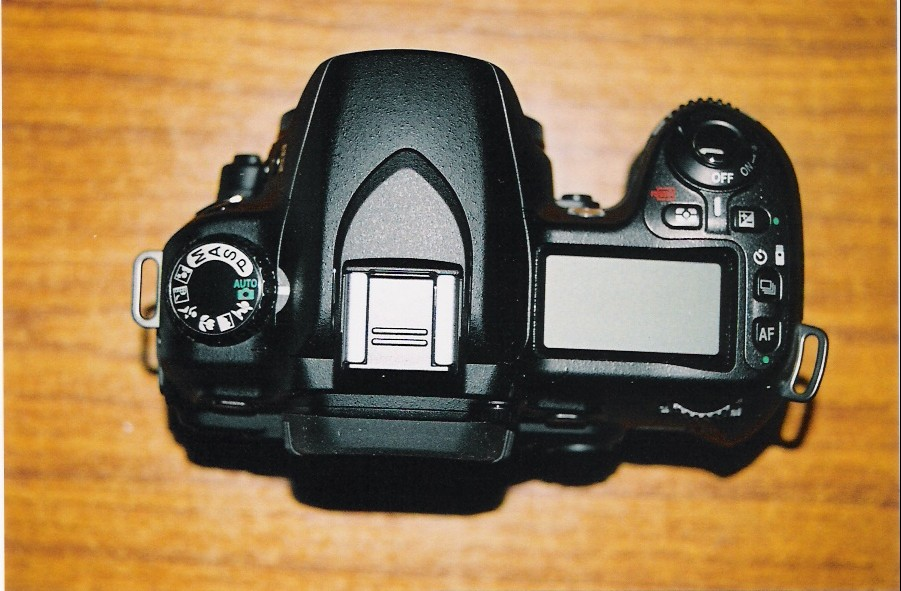
D80 body top view

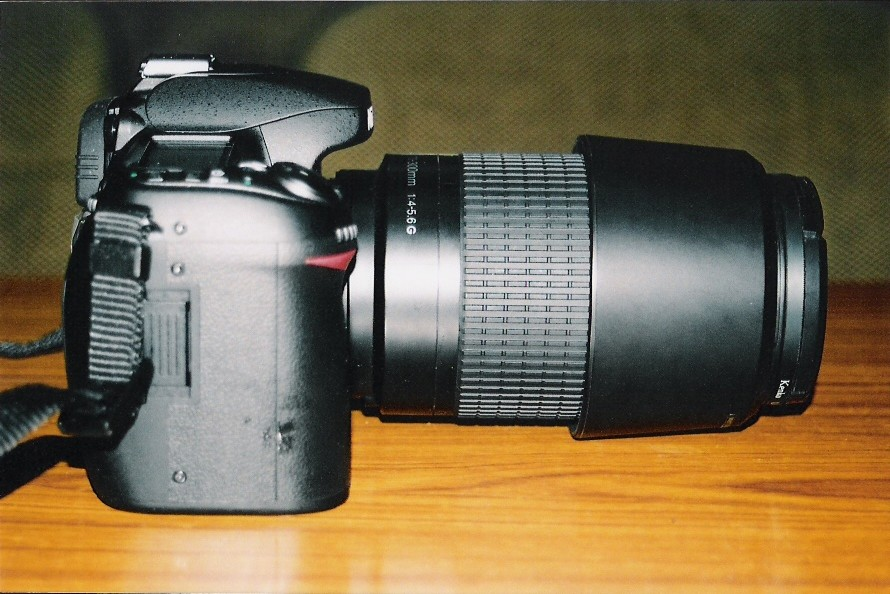
D80 with 70-300mm lens

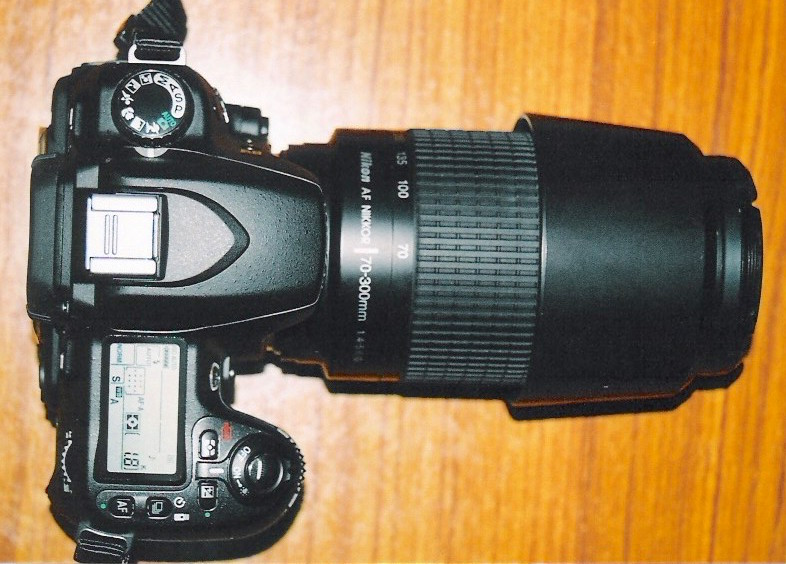
D80 with 70-300mm lens top view

== See also ==
- Nikon EXPEED
- List of Nikon F-mount lenses with integrated autofocus motors

Sensor	Class	1999	2000	2001	2002	2003	2004	2005	2006	2007	2008	2009	2010	2011	2012	2013	2014	2015	2016	2017	2018	2019	2020	2021	2022	2023	2024	2025	2026
FX (Full-frame)	Flagship											D3X ^{−P}																	
FX (Full-frame)	Flagship										D3 ^{−P}		D3S ^{−P}		D4		D4S		D5^{T}					D6^{T}					
FX (Full-frame)	Professional											D700 ^{−P}			D800/D800E			D810/D810A			D850 ^{AT}								
FX (Full-frame)	Enthusiast																Df												
FX (Full-frame)	Enthusiast																	D750 ^{A}					D780 ^{AT}						
FX (Full-frame)	Enthusiast															D600	D610												
DX (APS-C)	Flagship		D1^{−E}	D1X^{−E}				D2X^{−E}		D2Xs^{−E}																			
DX (APS-C)	Flagship		D1^{−E}	D1H ^{−E}			D2H^{−E}	D2Hs^{−E}																					
DX (APS-C)	Professional				D100^{−E}				D200^{−E}		D300^{−P}		D300S^{−P}						D500 ^{AT}										
DX (APS-C)	Enthusiast						D70^{−E}		D70s^{−E}	D80^{−E}		D90^{−E}		D7000 ^{−P}			D7100	D7200			D7500 ^{AT}								
DX (APS-C)	Upper-entry								D50^{−E}	D40X^{−E*}	D60^{−E*}		D5000^{A−P*}		D5100^{A−P*}	D5200^{A−P*}	D5300^{A*}	D5500^{AT*}		D5600 ^{AT*}									
DX (APS-C)	Entry-level									D40^{−E*}			D3000^{−E*}	D3100^{−P*}		D3200^{−P*}	D3300^{*}			D3400^{*}		D3500^{*}							
Early models		SVC (prototype; 1986); QV-1000C (1988); NASA F4 (1991); E2/E2S (1995); E2N/E2NS (1996); E3/E3S (1998)																											
Sensor	Class																												
Sensor	Class	1999	2000	2001	2002	2003	2004	2005	2006	2007	2008	2009	2010	2011	2012	2013	2014	2015	2016	2017	2018	2019	2020	2021	2022	2023	2024	2025	2026
