= Nikon F 70-210mm lens =

The 70-210mm lens is a telephoto zoom lens made by Nikon. The lens has an F-mount to work with all compatible Nikon SLRs and DSLRs.

As opposed to the various f/2.8 versions of the 70-210 focal length, the f/4 and slower versions of such lenses are marketed to amateurs, accounting for their price.

However, the Nikkor AF 70-210 f/4 variant is a two-touch system (dedicated focus and zoom rings), compared to the rest of the lens range, which utilizes a one-touch (push-pull) system for focusing and zooming.

The lens comes in five different versions.

- f/4.5-5.6
- f/4 Series E
- f/4 AF
- f/4-5.6 AF
- f/4-5.6 AF-D

== Specifications ==
Attribute	f/4 Series E	f/4.5-5.6	f/4 AF	f/4-5.6 AF	f/4-5.6 AF-D
AF	No No		Yes Yes		
Maximum aperture	f/4	f/4.5-5.6	f/4	f/4-5.6	
Minimum aperture	f/32				
Weight	730 g 26 oz	375 g 13.2 oz	760 g 27 oz	590 g 21 oz	600 g 21 oz
Maximum diameter					
Length					
Filter diameter	62mm	52mm	62mm		
Horizontal viewing angle	28.8 - 9.8°				
Vertical viewing angle	19.5 - 6.5°				
Diagonal viewing angle	34.3 - 11.8				
Groups/elements	9/13	8/11	9/13	9/12	
# of diaphragm blades			7		
Closest focusing distance	1.5 m 4.9 ft	1.5 m 4.9 ft	1.1 m 3.6 ft	1.2 m 3.9 ft	
Closest focusing distance	(macro mode, 70mm); 0.56 m 1.8 ft	1.5 m 4.9 ft	1.1 m 3.6 ft	1.2 m 3.9 ft	
Release date	1982	1995	1986	1988	1993
Patent(s)					
MSRP $					

== See also ==
- Nikon F 80-200mm lens
- Canon EF 70–210mm lens
