= Nikon D90 =

2008 APS-C Digital single-lens reflex camera

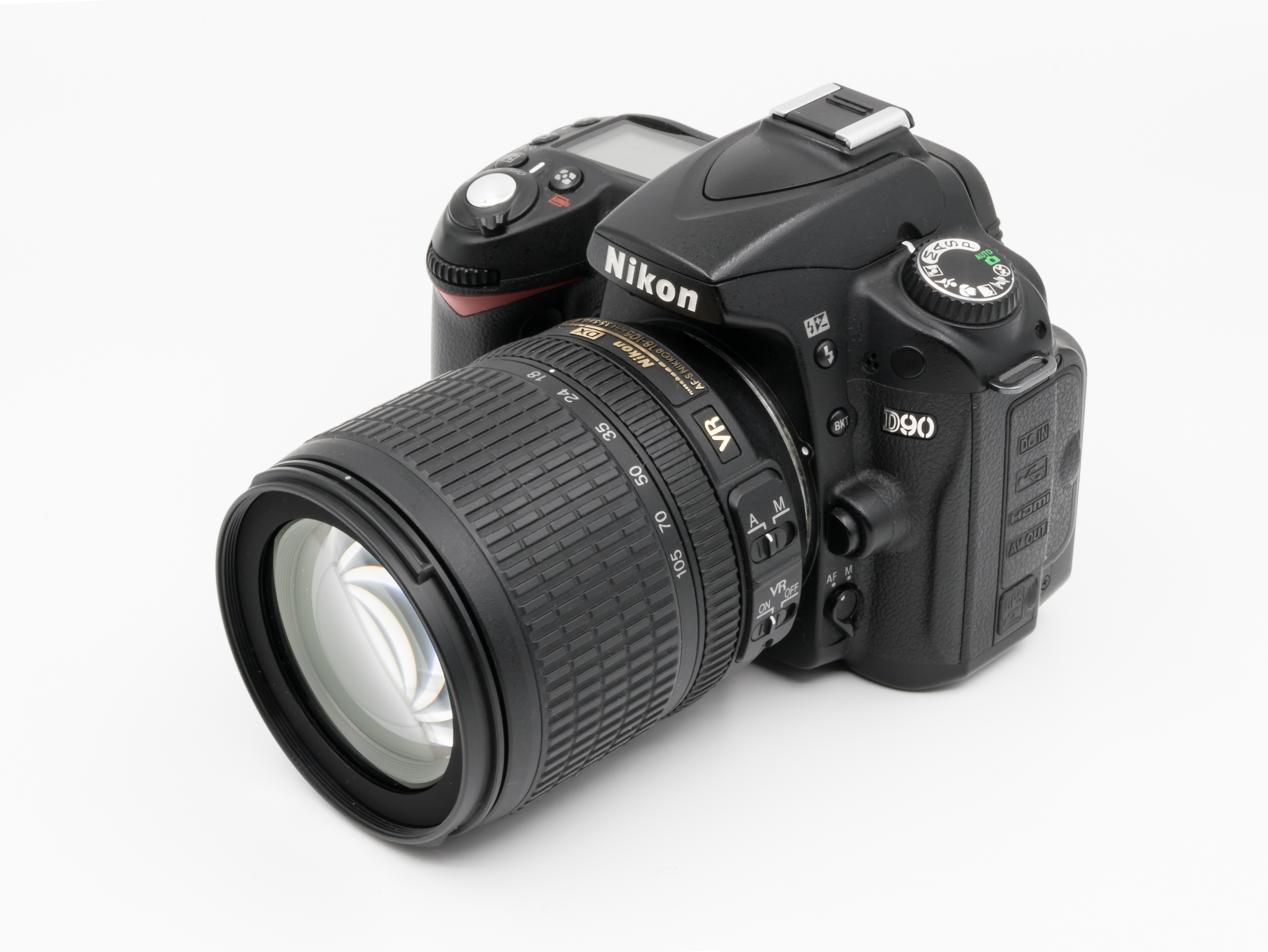
- Nikon D90 with AF-S DX 18-105mm f/3.5-5.6G ED VR Lens

Overview
- Maker: Nikon
- Type: Digital single-lens reflex
- Production: 2008-08-27 through 2011-5-15 (2 years 9 months)
- Intro price: US$899.95

Lens
- Lens mount: Nikon F-mount
- Lens: Interchangeable, Nikon F-mount

Sensor/medium
- Sensor: 23.6 mm × 15.8 mm Nikon DX format RGB CMOS sensor, 1.5 × FOV crop
- Maximum resolution: 4,288 × 2,848 (12.3 effective megapixels)
- Film speed: 200–3200 in 1/3 EV steps, up to 6400 as high-boost, as low as 100 low-boost
- Recording medium: 1x SD, SDHC compatible

Focusing
- Focus modes: Instant single-servo (AF-S); continuous-servo (AF-C); auto AF-S/AF-C selection (AF-A); manual (M)
- Focus areas: 11-area AF system, Multi-CAM 1000 AF Sensor Module

Exposure/metering
- Exposure modes: Auto modes (auto, auto [flash off]), Advanced Scene Modes (Portrait, Landscape, Sports, Close-up, Night Portrait), programmed auto with flexible program (P), shutter-priority auto (S), aperture-priority auto (A), manual (M)
- Exposure metering: TTL 3D Color Matrix Metering II metering with a 420-pixel RGB sensor
- Metering modes: 3D Color Matrix Metering II, Center-weighted and Spot

Flash
- Flash: Built in Pop-up, Guide number 13m at ISO 100, Standard ISO hot shoe, Compatible with the Nikon Creative Lighting System, featuring commander mode for wireless setups
- Flash bracketing: 2 or 3 frames in steps of 1/3, 1/2, 2/3, 1 or 2 EV

Shutter
- Shutter: Electronically-controlled vertical-travel focal-plane shutter
- Shutter speed range: 30 s to 1/4000 s in 1/2 or 1/3 stops and Bulb, 1/200 s X-sync
- Continuous shooting: 4.5 frame/s up to 100 JPEG-normal, 25 JPEG-fine, or 7 NEF images

Viewfinder
- Viewfinder: Optical 0.94× Pentaprism

Image processing
- Image processor: Expeed
- White balance: Auto, Incandescent, Fluorescent, Sunlight, Flash, Cloudy, Shade, Kelvin temperature, Preset

General
- LCD screen: 3.0-inch 920,000 pixel (VGA x 3 colors) TFT-LCD
- Battery: Nikon EN-EL3e Lithium-Ion battery (EN-EL3 or EN-EL3a will not fit)
- Optional battery packs: MB-D80 battery pack (with vertical shutter release) with one or two Nikon EN-EL3e or six AA batteries
- Dimensions: 132×103×77 mm (5.2×4.1×3.0 in)
- Weight: approx. 620 g (1.37 lb) without battery, 703 g (1.550 lb) with battery
- Made in: Thailand

The Nikon D90 is a 12.3-megapixel digital single-lens reflex camera (DSLR) model announced by Nikon on August 27, 2008. It is a prosumer model that replaces the Nikon D80, fitting between the company's entry-level and professional DSLR models. It has a Nikon DX format crop sensor.

Nikon gave the estimated selling price in the United States as US$ 899.95 for the body alone and as $1299.99 with the Nikkor AF-S DX 18-105mm f/3.5-5.6G ED VR, which by itself sold for $399.95.

The D90 was the first DSLR with video recording capabilities. In May 2009, the D90 won the TIPA European Photo & Imaging Award, in the "Best D-SLR Advanced" category.

== Features ==
Some of the improvements the D90 offers over the D80 include 12.3-megapixel resolution (vs. D80's 10.2), extended light sensitivity capabilities, live view and automatic correction of lateral chromatic aberration. The D90 is the first DSLR to offer video recording, with the ability to record HD 720p videos, with mono sound, at 24 frames per second.

Unlike less expensive models such as the D40, D60, D3000 and D5000, the D90 has a built in autofocus motor, which means that all Nikon F-mount autofocus-lenses (the only exceptions being the AF-80mm f/2.8 Nikkor and the AF-200mm f/3.5 Nikkor, designed for the rare Nikon F3AF) can be used in autofocus mode.

The Nikon D90 is the first Nikon camera to include a third firmware module, labeled "L," which provides an updateable lens distance integration database that improves autoexposure functions. Some of its accessories, such as the MB-D80 battery grip and ML-L3 wireless remote, are also compatible with its predecessor the D80. It supports Global Positioning System integration for automatic location tagging of photographs, using a GPS receiver sold separately.

=== Feature list ===
- Nikon's 12.3 megapixel Nikon DX format CMOS sensor.
- Nikon EXPEED image/video processor.
- D-Movie mode (720p, with mono 22kHz sound).
- Active D-Lighting (4 levels and Auto).
- Automatic correction of lateral chromatic aberration for JPEGs. Correction-data is additionally stored in RAW-files and used by Nikon Capture NX, View NX and some other RAW tools.
- Lens distortion correction as well as image rotation ("Straighten") via playback ("Retouch") menu
- 3-inch TFT LCD with 920,000-dot resolution (640×480 VGA) and 170-degree ultra-wide viewing angle.
- Live View shooting mode (activated with a dedicated button).
- Continuous Drive up to 4.5 frames per second.
- 3D Color Matrix Metering II with Scene Recognition System.
- 3D Tracking Multi-CAM 1000 autofocus sensor module with 11 AF points.
- Face detection autofocus in live view mode.
- ISO sensitivity 200 to 3200 (100–6400 with H1.0 boost).
- Nikon F-mount lenses
- i-TTL flash exposure system with built-in wireless control (Commander-mode). Compatibility: SB-400, SB-600, SB-700, SB-800, SB-900, SB-910, R1C1 and third-party manufacturers
- Built-in Sensor cleaning system (vibrating low-pass filter).
- HDMI HD video output
- Support for GPS unit direct connect.
- File formats: JPEG, NEF (Nikon's RAW, 12-bit compressed), AVI (Motion JPEG).
- EN-EL3e lithium-ion battery, battery life (shots per charge) approx. 850 shots (CIPA).
- Weight: Approx. 620 g (1.37 lb) without battery, 703 g (1.550 lb) with battery.

=== Video recording ===
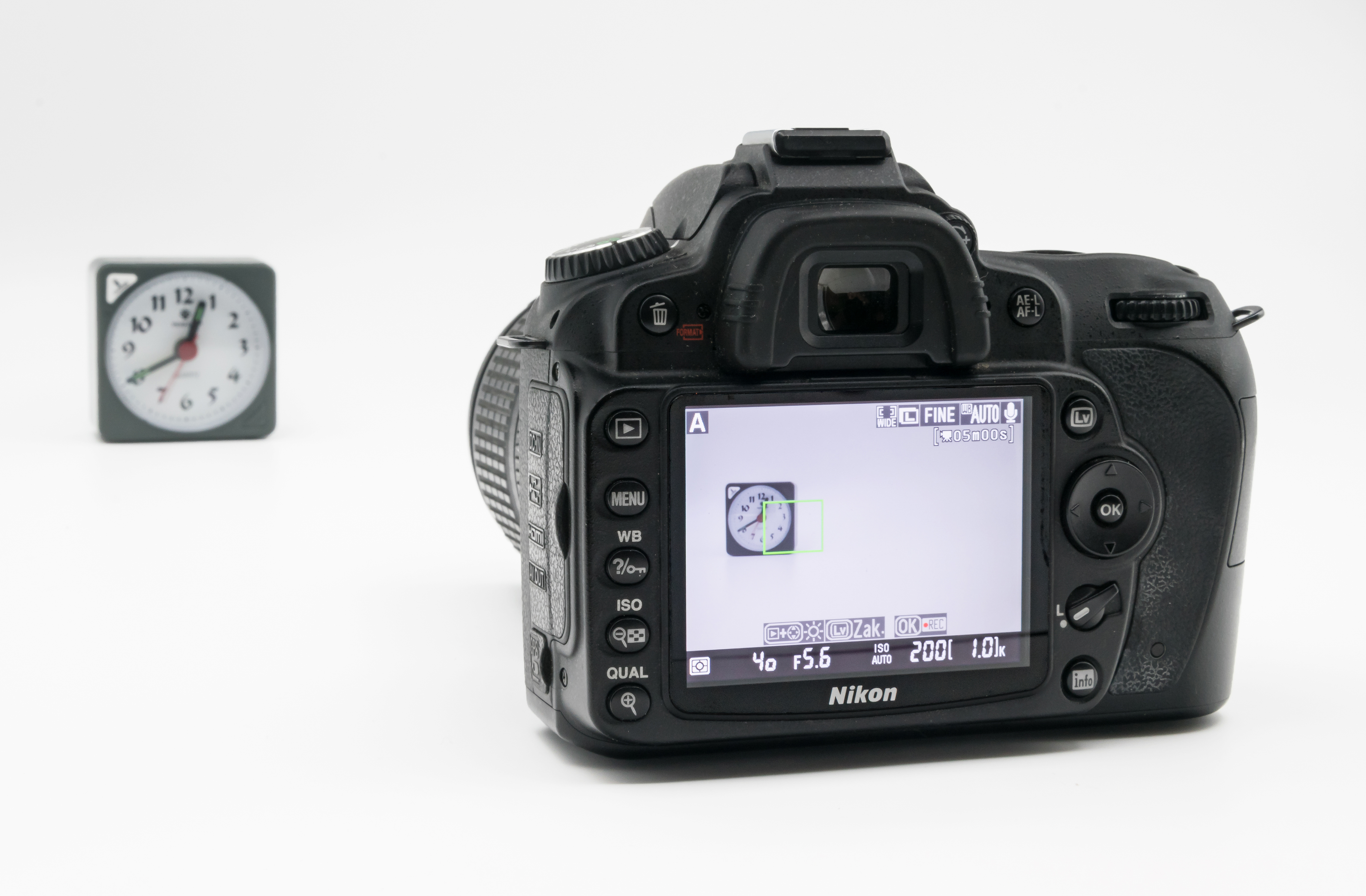
A D90 in Liveview mode

The D90 is the first DSLR with video recording capabilities; it can record 720p high-definition video with monaural sound. However, it does not auto-focus while filming video; to keep a subject in focus, the user must manually track subject motion. Soon after the D90's introduction, many new DSLRs from Nikon and other manufacturers began including video recording as a standard feature.

Video recording is activated by pressing the Live View button and then pressing the OK button.

As with other DSLRs, the D90's CMOS sensor captures video frames using a rolling shutter, which may cause skewing artifacts during rapid camera or subject motion. Recorded videos are limited to a 2 GB file size and a duration of 5–20 minutes for each continuous clip, depending on resolution. This threshold limit is due to the overheating of the sensor if it is active for longer periods of time.

The first feature film shot with a D90 was Reverie in 2009. Ray Mist, the film's cinematographer, praised the camera for its dynamic range, its ability to support 35 mm optics offering greater choices of focal length and depth of focus, and large sensor in comparison to standard video cameras within and beyond the D90's price range.

=== Optional accessories ===
The D90 has a range of accessories such as:

- Nikon ML-L3 Wireless (Infrared) remote control, MC-DC2 Remote Cord or third party solutions.
- Nikon GP-1 GPS Unit for direct GPS geotagging. Third party solutions partly with 3-axis compass, data-logger, bluetooth, wireless remote systems, and support for indoor use are available from Solmeta, Dawn, Easytag, Foolography (Unleashed D90), Gisteq and Phottix. See comparisons/reviews.
- MB-D80 Multi Power Battery grip or third party solutions.
- Third party solutions for a WLAN transmitter set are available.
- Nikon CF-D80 Semi-Soft Case.
- Various Nikon Speedlight or third party flash units. Also working as commander for Nikon Creative Lighting System wireless (slave) flash.

Third party radio (wireless) flash control triggers are partly supporting i-TTL, but do not support the Nikon Creative Lighting System (CLS). See reviews.

- Tethered shooting with Nikon Camera Control Pro 2, Adobe Lightroom 3 or other partly free products, including mobile applications.
- Other accessories from Nikon and third parties, including protective cases and bags, eyepiece adapters and correction lenses, and underwater housings.

== Reception ==
The Nikon D90 has been tested by many independent reviewers since its introduction. Most reviews of the D90 have been positive, assessing the D90 as a notable improvement over its predecessor, the Nikon D80. The camera received 4 stars out of 5 in CNET's editor review and Photocrati's Nikon D90 review labeled the D90 a "best value" DSLR. Digital Photography Review also published a highly positive assessment, but noted that the only weakness seemed to be that matrix metering on the D90 is tied too strongly to individual focus points, and therefore allows highlights to be clipped in other areas of an image. In DxOmark's camera sensor RAW image ratings, the D90 achieved a score of 72.6, placing it above its competitors and more expensive cameras such as the Canon EOS 1D Mark III (71), Canon EOS 5D (70.9) and Nikon D300S (69.8). Statistics from Photo sharing website Flickr also show that the D90 is ranked as the most used Nikon system in terms of picture uploads.

As noted above, one of the most notable features of the Nikon D90 is that it is the first digital SLR camera to include high definition video capabilities. While most reviewers gave the D90's HD video high marks, Nikon expert Thom Hogan noted that the HD video capability, while novel, was not yet refined, providing only mono sound, and being subject to video flaws such as apparent distorted motion of stationary objects when panning.

| Sensor | Class | 1999 | 2000 | 2001 | 2002 | 2003 | 2004 | 2005 | 2006 | 2007 | 2008 | 2009 | 2010 | 2011 | 2012 | 2013 | 2014 | 2015 | 2016 | 2017 | 2018 | 2019 | 2020 | 2021 | 2022 | 2023 | 2024 | 2025 | 2026 |
|---|---|---|---|---|---|---|---|---|---|---|---|---|---|---|---|---|---|---|---|---|---|---|---|---|---|---|---|---|---|
| FX (Full-frame) | Flagship | | | | | | | | | | | D3X ^{−P} | | | | | | | | | | | | | | | | | |
| FX (Full-frame) | Flagship | | | | | | | | | | D3 ^{−P} | | D3S ^{−P} | | D4 | | D4S | | D5^{T} | | | | | D6^{T} | | | | | |
| FX (Full-frame) | Professional | | | | | | | | | | | D700 ^{−P} | | | D800/D800E | | | D810/D810A | | | D850 ^{AT} | | | | | | | | |
| FX (Full-frame) | Enthusiast | | | | | | | | | | | | | | | | Df | | | | | | | | | | | | |
| FX (Full-frame) | Enthusiast | | | | | | | | | | | | | | | | | D750 ^{A} | | | | | D780 ^{AT} | | | | | | |
| FX (Full-frame) | Enthusiast | | | | | | | | | | | | | | | D600 | D610 | | | | | | | | | | | | |
| DX (APS-C) | Flagship | | D1^{−E} | D1X^{−E} | | | | D2X^{−E} | | D2Xs^{−E} | | | | | | | | | | | | | | | | | | | |
| DX (APS-C) | Flagship | | D1^{−E} | D1H ^{−E} | | | D2H^{−E} | D2Hs^{−E} | | | | | | | | | | | | | | | | | | | | | |
| DX (APS-C) | Professional | | | | D100^{−E} | | | | D200^{−E} | | D300^{−P} | | D300S^{−P} | | | | | | D500 ^{AT} | | | | | | | | | | |
| DX (APS-C) | Enthusiast | | | | | | D70^{−E} | | D70s^{−E} | D80^{−E} | | D90^{−E} | | D7000 ^{−P} | | | D7100 | D7200 | | | D7500 ^{AT} | | | | | | | | |
| DX (APS-C) | Upper-entry | | | | | | | | D50^{−E} | D40X^{−E*} | D60^{−E*} | | D5000^{A−P*} | | D5100^{A−P*} | D5200^{A−P*} | D5300^{A*} | D5500^{AT*} | | D5600 ^{AT*} | | | | | | | | | |
| DX (APS-C) | Entry-level | | | | | | | | | D40^{−E*} | | | D3000^{−E*} | D3100^{−P*} | | D3200^{−P*} | D3300^{*} | | | D3400^{*} | | D3500^{*} | | | | | | | |
| Early models | | SVC (prototype; 1986); QV-1000C (1988); NASA F4 (1991); E2/E2S (1995); E2N/E2NS (1996); E3/E3S (1998) | | | | | | | | | | | | | | | | | | | | | | | | | | | |
| Sensor | Class | | | | | | | | | | | | | | | | | | | | | | | | | | | | |
| Sensor | Class | 1999 | 2000 | 2001 | 2002 | 2003 | 2004 | 2005 | 2006 | 2007 | 2008 | 2009 | 2010 | 2011 | 2012 | 2013 | 2014 | 2015 | 2016 | 2017 | 2018 | 2019 | 2020 | 2021 | 2022 | 2023 | 2024 | 2025 | 2026 |
