= History of photographic lens design =

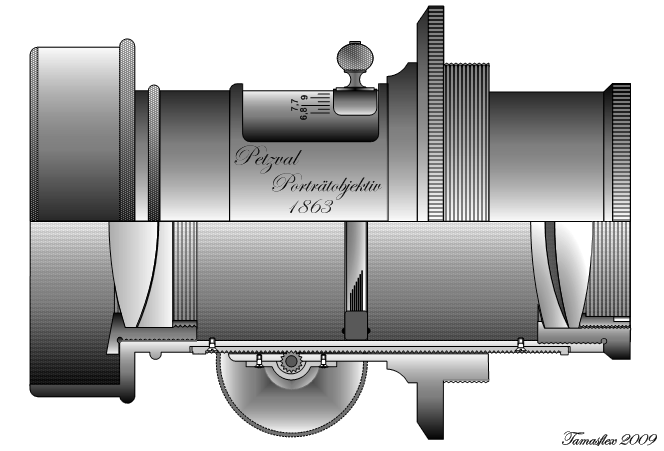
Cutaway drawing of an early photographic lens design, the Petzval Portrait

The invention of the camera in the early 19th century led to an array of lens designs intended for photography. The problems of photographic lens design, creating a lens for a task that would cover a large, flat image plane, were well known even before the invention of photography due to the development of lenses to work with the focal plane of the camera obscura.

== Early photographic camera lenses (1800–1890) ==
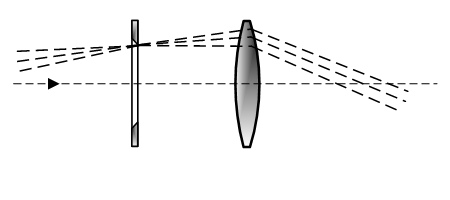
Biconvex (or double convex) lens with aperture stop in front of it

The early photographic experiments of Thomas Wedgwood, Nicéphore Niépce, Henry Fox Talbot, and Louis Daguerre all used simple single-element convex lenses. These lenses were found lacking. Simple lenses could not focus an image over a large flat film plane (field curvature) and suffered from other optical aberrations. Their severe longitudinal chromatic aberration meant the light the photographers were seeing (generally yellow light) and the light to which the early photographic mediums were sensitive not converge to the same point, making it difficult to focus.

Some lens aberration encountered by early photographers
Chromatic aberration

Spherical aberration

Coma

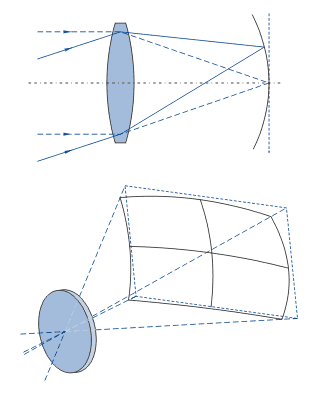
Field curvature

Reversed achromatic lens

Charles Chevalier's Paris optical firm produced lenses for both Niépce and Daguerre for their experiments in photography. In 1829, Chevalier created an achromatic lens (a two-element lens made from crown glass and flint glass) to cut down on chromatic aberration for Daguerre's experiments. Chevalier reversed the lens (originally designed as a telescope objective) to produce a much flatter image plane and modified the achromat to bring the blue end of the spectrum to a sharper focus. Reversing the lens caused severe spherical aberration so a narrow aperture stop was necessary in front of the lens. On 22 June 1839, Daguerre contracted Alphonse Giroux (France) to manufacture his daguerreotype apparatus. The Giroux Le Daguerreotype camera used an almost 16-inch (40 cm) focal length reversed achromatic lens with a f/16 stop in front of it made by Chevalier to take 6½×8½ inch (about 16.5×21.5 cm) images.

=== Meniscus or 'landscape' lens ===
In 1804 William Hyde Wollaston invented a positive meniscus lens for eyeglasses. In 1812 Wollaston adapted it as a lens for the camera obscura by mounting it with the concave side facing outward with an aperture stop in front of it, making the lens reasonably sharp over a wide field. Niépce began using Wollaston Meniscus in 1828. Daguerre used this lens in his experiments, but since it was a single-element lens that lacked any chromatic aberration control it was impossible to focus accurately with the blue-sensitive media in the daguerreotype process.

By the end of 1839, Chevalier had created an achromatic version of the meniscus that combined field flattening and chromatic aberration control. The lens had the reverse concave flint glass side facing the subject and an f/16 aperture stop at its radius of curvature, making it reasonably sharp over a wide field of about 50°. Reversing the lens did increase chromatic aberration, but this fault could be lessened by adjusting the achromat to bring colors at the blue end of the spectrum into focus to match the blue-sensitive nature of the photographic emulsion. This design was copied by other lens makers. Because of its large flat field over a wide angle of view and its "slow" f/16 aperture (requiring twenty to thirty minutes for outdoor daguerreotype exposures), this lens came to be known as the "French landscape lens" or simply the "landscape lens".

Meniscus camera lenses
Wollaston Meniscus lens

Chevalier Achromat Meniscus "Landscape" lens

=== Petzval Portrait lens ===
Petzval Portrait lens

Because the Achromat Landscape lens was quite slow, the French Society for the Encouragement of National Industry offered an international prize in 1840 for a faster one. Joseph Petzval (of modern Slovakia) was a mathematics professor with no optical physics experience, but, with the aid of several human computers of the Austro-Hungarian army, he took up the challenge of producing a lens fast enough for a daguerreotype portrait.

He came up with the Petzval Portrait (modern Austria) in 1840, a four-element lens consisting of a front-cemented achromat and a rear air-spaced achromat that, at f/3.6, was the first wide-aperture portrait lens. It was appropriate for one- to two-minute shaded outdoors daguerreotype exposures. With the faster collodion (wet plate) process developed in the 1850s, a camera equipped with this lens could take one- to two-minute indoor portraits. Because of national chauvinism, the Petzval did not win the prize, despite being far superior to all other entries.

A 150mm Petzval lens was fitted to a conical metal Voigtländer camera taking circular daguerreotypes in 1841. The Voigtländer-Petzval was the first camera and lens specifically designed to take photographs, instead of being simply a modified artist's camera obscura. The Petzval Portrait was the dominant portrait lens for nearly a century. It had what would now be considered severe field curvature and astigmatism, but It was centrally sharp (about a 20° field of view, or 10° for critical applications), and it quickly drifted out of focus to a soft outer field, producing a pleasant halo effect around the subject. The Petzval Portrait remains popular as a projection lens where the narrow angles involved mean the field curvature is not significant.

The Portrait was illegally copied by every lens maker, and Petzval had a nasty falling out with Peter Voigtländer over unpaid royalties and died an embittered old man. Although the Portrait was the first mathematically computed lens formula, trial and error would continue to dominate photographic lens design for another half century, despite well-established physical mathematics dating from 1856 (by Philipp Ludwig von Seidel [modern Germany], working for Hugo Adolph Steinheil [modern Germany]), to the detriment of lens improvement.

=== Overcoming optical aberrations ===
Harrison & Schnitzer Globe

Dallmeyer Rapid-Rectilinear and Steinheil Aplanat

The Achromat Landscape was also afflicted with rectilinear distortion – straight lines were imaged as curved. This distortion was a pressing problem as architecture was an important photography subject early on. In addition, photographs of exotic places (especially in stereoscope form) were a popular means to see the world from the comfort of one's home – the picture postcard is a mid-19th century invention. The distortion got progressively worse as the field of view increased, which meant the Achromat Landscape could not be used as a wide-angle lens.

The first successful wide-angle lens was the Harrison & Schnitzer Globe (USA) of 1862, although with a f/16 maximum aperture (f/30 was more realistic). The lens had a 92° maximum field of view, although 80° was more realistic. Charles Harrison and Joseph Schnitzer's Globe had a symmetric four-element formula; the name refers to the consideration that if the two outer surfaces were continued and then joined, they would form a sphere.

Symmetry was discovered in the 1850s to automatically correct the distortion, coma, and transverse chromatic distortions. There are also decentration aberrations arising from manufacturing errors. A real lens will not produce images of expected quality if it is not constructed to or cannot stay in specification.

There are additional optical phenomena that can degrade image quality but are not considered aberrations. For example, the oblique cos^{4}θ light falloff, sometimes called natural vignetting, and lateral magnification and perspective distortions seen in wide angle lenses are really geometric effects of projecting three-dimensional objects down into two-dimensional images, not physical defects.

The Globe's symmetric formula directly influenced the design of the Dallmeyer Rapid-Rectilinear (UK) and Steinheil Aplanat (modern Germany). By coincidence, John Dallmeyer's Rapid-Rectilinear and Adolph Steinheil's Aplanat had virtually identical symmetric four-element formulae, arrived at almost simultaneously in 1866, all of which corrected most optical aberrations, except for spherical and field curvature, to f/8. The breakthrough was to use glass of maximum refractive index difference but equal dispersion in each achromat. The Rapid-Rectilinear and Aplanat lenses were scalable over many focal lengths and fields of view for all contemporaneous media, and they were the standard moderate-aperture, general-purpose lenses for more than half a century.

The Landscape, the Portrait, the Globe, and the Rapid-Rectilinear/Aplanat constituted the nineteenth-century photographer's entire lens arsenal.

=== Aperture stops ===
It was known in the 1500s that an aperture stop would improve lens image quality. It would be discovered that this was because a center stop that blocks peripheral light limits the transverse aberrations (coma, astigmatism, field curvature, distortion, and lateral chromatic) unless the stop is so small that diffraction becomes dominant. Even today, most lenses produce their best images at their middle apertures, at a compromise between transverse aberrations and diffraction.

Therefore, even the Meniscus had a permanent stop. Nevertheless, the earliest lenses did not have adjustable stops: their small working apertures and the lack of sensitivity of the daguerreotype process meant that exposure times were measured in many minutes. Photographers did not want to limit the light passing through the lens and lengthen the exposure time. When the increased sensitivity wet collodion process was perfected in 1851, exposure times were shortened dramatically and adjustable stops became practical.

The earliest selectable stops were the Waterhouse stops of 1858, named for John Waterhouse. These were sets of accessory brass plates with sized holes, mounted through a slot in the side of the lens structure.

Around 1880, photographers realized that aperture size affected depth of field. Aperture control gained more significance, and adjustable stops became a standard lens feature. The iris diaphragm made its appearance as an adjustable lens stop in the 1880s, and it became the standard adjustable stop about 1900. The iris diaphragm had been common in early nineteenth century cameras obscura, and Niépce used one in at least one of his experimental cameras. However, the specific type of iris used in modern lenses was invented in 1858 by Charles Harrison and Joseph Schnitzer. Harrison and Schnitzer's iris diaphragm was capable of rapid open and close cycles, an absolute necessity for lenses with camera auto-aperture control.

The modern lens aperture markings of f-numbers in geometric sequence of f/1, 1.4, 2, 2.8, 4, 5.6, 8, 11, 16, 22, 32, 45, 64, 90, etc. was standardized in 1949. Previously, this British system competed with the Continental (German) sequence of f/1.1, 1.6, 2.2, 3.2, 4.5, 6.3, 9, 12.5, 18, 25, 36, 50, 71, 100 ratios. In addition, the Uniform System (U.S., invented UK) sequence of 1, 2, 4, 8, 16, 32, 64, 128, etc. (where U.S. 1 = f/4, U.S. 2 = f/5.6, U.S. 4 = f/8, etc.), was favored by Eastman Kodak early in the twentieth century.

=== Telephoto lens ===
Dallmeyer and Miethe telephotos

Busch Bis-Telar

A single-element camera lens is as long as its focal length; for example, 500 mm-focal-length lens requires 500 mm from the lens to the image plane. A telephoto lens is made physically shorter than its nominal focal length by pairing a front positive imaging cell with a rear magnifying negative cell. The powerful front group over-refracts the image, the rear restores the focal plane, thereby greatly shortening the back-focus length. Originally, accessory negative cells were sold to attach to the rear of a regular lens. The Barlow lens, a negative achromat magnifier invented by Peter Barlow in 1833, is still used to increase the eyepiece magnification of amateur telescopes. The teleconverter is the modern photographic equivalent.

In 1891, Thomas Dallmeyer and Adolf Miethe simultaneously attempted to patent new lens designs with nearly identical formulae – complete photographic telephoto lenses consisting of a front achromat doublet and rear achromat triplet. Primacy was never established and no patent was ever granted for the first telephoto lens.

The front and rear cells of early telephotos were unmatched and the rear cell also magnified any aberrations, as well as the image, of the imaging cell. The cell spacing was also tunable, because that could be used to adjust the effective focal length, but that only worsened aberration problems. The first telephoto lens optically corrected and fixed as a system was the f/8 Busch Bis-Telar (Germany) of 1905.

== Anastigmat lens designs (1890–1950) ==
=== Zeiss Protar ===
Zeiss Protar

The photographic lens leapt forward in 1890 with the Zeiss Protar (Germany). Paul Rudolph's Protar was the first successful anastigmat (highly corrected [for the era] for all aberrations, including properly for astigmatism) lens. It was scalable from f/4.5 portrait to f/18 super wide angle. The Protar was originally called the Anastigmat, but that descriptive term quickly became generic and the lens was given a fanciful name in 1900.

The Protar is considered the first "modern" lens, because it had an asymmetric formula allowed by the new design freedom opened up by newly available barium oxide, crown optical glasses. These glasses were invented by Ernst Abbe, a physicist, and Otto Schott, a chemist, (both Germany) in 1884, working for Carl Zeiss' Jena Glass Works. Schott glasses have higher refractive index than soda-lime crown glass without higher dispersion. The Protar's front achromat used older glass, but the rear achromat used high index glass. Virtually all good quality photographic lenses since circa 1930 are anastigmat corrected. (The primary exceptions are deliberately "soft-focus" portrait lenses.)

Today's photographic lens state-of-the-art is apochromatic correction, which is, very roughly, twice as strict as anastigmatic. However, such lenses require correcting for higher ordered aberrations than the original seven with rare earth (lanthanum oxide) or fluorite (calcium fluoride) glasses of very high refractive index and/or very low dispersion of mid-twentieth century invention. The first apochromatic lens for consumer cameras was the Leitz APO-Telyt-R 180mm f/3.4 (1975, West Germany) for Leicaflex series (1964, West Germany) 35mm SLRs. Most professional telephoto lenses since the early 1980s are apochromatic. Note, better-than-apochromat lenses are available for scientific/military/industrial work.

=== Cooke Triplet ===
Taylor, Taylor & Hobson Cooke Triplet

The quintessential twentieth century photographic lens was the 1893 Taylor, Taylor & Hobson Cooke Triplet. Harold Taylor's (UK, not related to the Taylors of T, T & H) Cooke Triplet was a deceptively simple looking asymmetric three element anastigmat formula created by reexamining lens design from first principles to take maximum advantage of the advances in new Schott optical glasses. The elements were all of such strong power that they were highly sensitive to misalignment and required tight manufacturing tolerances for the era.

The Cooke Triplet became the standard "economy" lens of the twentieth century. For example, the Argus Cintar 50mm f/3.5 for the Argus C3 (1937, USA), probably the best-selling rangefinder camera of all time, used a Cooke triplet.

The Triplet was adequate for contact prints from medium format roll film cameras and small enlargements from 35mm "miniature" format cameras, but not for big ones. The films of the first half of the twentieth century did not have much resolving power either, so that was not necessarily a problem.

=== Tessar ===
Zeiss Tessar

Paul Rudolph developed the Tessar from dissatisfaction with the performance of his earlier Protar, although it also resembles the Cooke triplet. The Tessar was originally an f/6.3 lens. It was refined to f/2.8 by 1930, although f/3.5 was the realistic limit for best image quality.

The Tessar was the standard high-quality, moderate-aperture, normal-perspective lens of the twentieth century. The Kodak Anastigmat Special 100mm f/3.5 on the Kodak Super Six-20 (1938, USA), the first autoexposure still camera, was a Tessar, as was the D. Zuiko 28 mm f/3.5 on the Olympus Pen (1959, Japan), the original Pen half frame camera; the Schneider S-Xenar 40mm f/3.5 on the late version of the Rollei 35 (1974, West Germany/Singapore); and the AF Nikkor D 45mm f/2.8P Special Edition for the Nikon FM3A (2001, Japan), the last manual focus 35mm SLR released by a major maker. It was fitting that the Zeiss Stiftung's last camera, the Zeiss Ikon S 312, had a Zeiss Tessar 40mm f/2.8 (1972, West Germany).

It is often incorrectly stated that the Leitz Elmar 50mm f/3.5 fixed to the Leica A (1925, Germany), Leitz's first camera, was a Tessar. However, at the time the Leica was introduced the 50mm f/3.5 Kino Tessar had only been designed to cover the cine format of 18x24mm, which was insufficient for the new 24x36mm format of the Leica, and Leitz had to develop a new lens to provide adequate full frame coverage. It was only when Zeiss Ikon were designing the Contax in response to the success of the Leica that a 50mm Tessar which could cover the 24x36mm format was designed. The Elmar was based on a modified Cooke Triplet with a different computation to the Tessar and with the stop in the first air space.

=== Ernostar and Sonnar ===
Ernemann Ernostar 10.5cm f/1.8

Zeiss Sonnar 50mm f/1.5

With anastigmat image quality achieved, attention next turned to increasing aperture size to allow photography in lower light or with faster shutter speeds. The first common very wide aperture lens suitable for candid available light photography was the Ernemann Ernostar (Germany) of 1923. Ludwig Bertele's formula was originally a 10 cm f/2 lens, but he improved it to 10.5 cm and 85mm f/1.8 in 1924. The Ernostar was also a Cooke Triplet derivative; it has an extra front positive element or group.

Mounted on the Ernemann Ermanox (1923, Germany) camera and in the hands of Erich Salomon, the Ernostar pioneered modern photojournalism. French Premier Aristide Briand once said: "There are just three things necessary for an international conference: a few Foreign Secretaries, a table and Salomon." Note, American photojournalists favored flash use into the 1950s (see Arthur Fellig [Weegee]).

Bertele continued Ernostar development under the more famous Sonnar name after Ernemann was absorbed by Zeiss in 1926. He reached f/1.5 in 1932 with the Zeiss Sonnar 50mm f/1.5 for the Contax I 35mm rangefinder camera (1932, Germany).

The Sonnar was (and is) also popular as a telephoto lens design – the Sonnar is always at least slightly telephoto because of its powerful front positive elements. The Zeiss Olympia Sonnar 180mm f/2.8 for the Contax II (both 1936, Germany) is a classic, if not mythic, example.

=== Asymmetric double Gauss ===
In 1817 Carl Friedrich Gauss improved the Fraunhofer telescope objective by adding a meniscus lens to its single convex and concave lens design. Alvan Clark further refined the design in 1888 by taking two of these lenses and placing them back to back. The lens was named in honour of Gauss. The current design can be traced back to 1895, when Paul Rudolph of Carl Zeiss Jena used cemented doublets as the central lenses to correct for chromatic aberration.

Later the design was developed with additional glasses to give high-performance lenses of wide aperture. The main development was due to Taylor Hobson in the 1920s, resulting in the f/2.0 Opic and later the Speed Panchro designs, which were licensed to various other manufacturers. The design forms the basis for many camera lenses in use today, especially the wide-aperture standard lenses used on 35 mm and other small-format cameras. It can offer good results up to f/1.4 with a wide field of view, and has sometimes been made at f/1.0.

The design is presently used in inexpensive-but-high-quality fast lenses such as the Canon EF 50mm f/1.8 and Nikon 50 mm f/1.8D AF Nikkor. It is also used as the basis for faster designs, with elements added, such as a seventh element as in both Canon and Nikon's 50 mm f/1.4 offerings or an aspherical seventh element in Canon's 50 mm f/1.2. The design appears in other applications where a simple fast normal lens is required (~53° diagonal) such as in projectors.

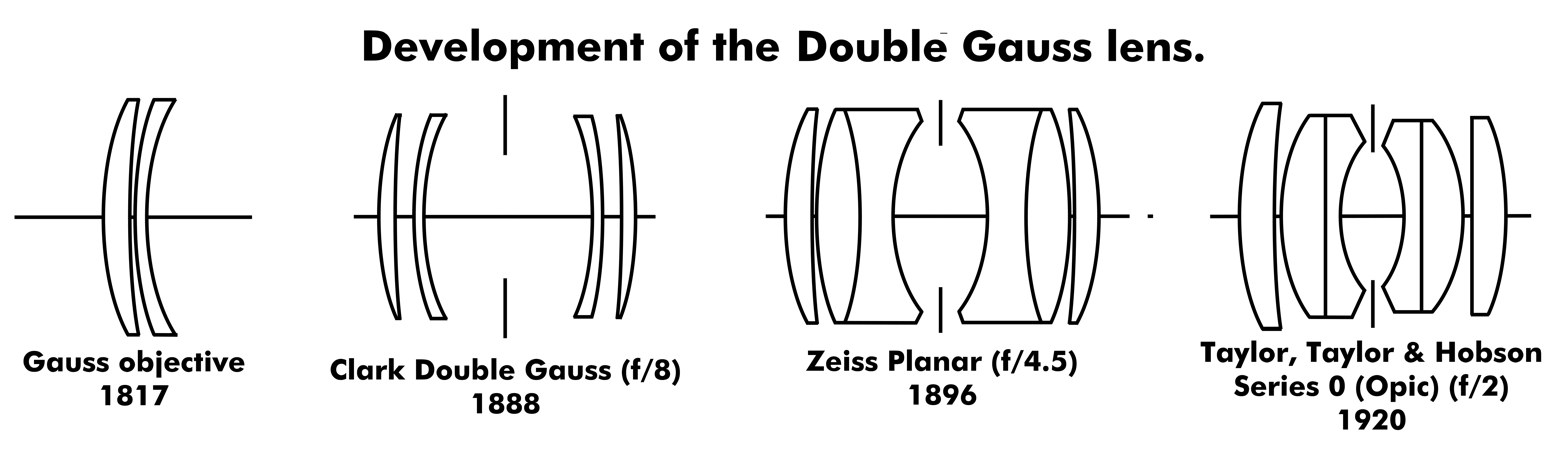
Development of the Double Gauss

== Mid-century developments (1950–1980) ==
=== Retrofocus wide-angle lens ===
Angénieux Retrofocus 35mm f/2.5

Zeiss Biogon 21mm f/4.5

Regular wide angle lenses (meaning lenses with focal length much shorter than the format diagonal and producing a wide field of view) need to be mounted close to the film. However, SLR cameras require that lenses be mounted far enough in front of the film to provide space for the movement of the mirror (the "mirror box"); about 40 mm for a 35mm SLR compared to less than 10 mm in non-SLR 35mm cameras. This prompted the development of wide field of view lenses with more complex retrofocus optical designs. These use very large negative front elements to force back-focus distances long enough to ensure clearance.

In 1950, the Angénieux Retrofocus Type R1 35mm f/2.5 (France) was the first retrofocus wide angle lens for 35mm SLRs (Exaktas). Except for the front element, Pierre Angénieux' R1 was a five element Tessar. Note, "retrofocus" was an Angénieux trademark before losing exclusive status. The original generic term was "inverted" or "reversed telephoto." A telephoto lens has a front positive cell and rear negative cell; retrofocus lenses have the negative cell in front and positive cell to the rear. The first inverted telephoto imaging lens was the Taylor, Taylor & Hobson 35mm f/2 (1931, UK) developed to provide back-focus space for the beamsplitter prism used by the full-color via three negatives Technicolor motion picture camera. Other early members of the Angénieux Retrofocus line included the 28mm f/3.5 Type R11 of 1953 and the 24mm f/3.5 Type R51 of 1957.

Retrofocus lenses are extremely asymmetric with their large front elements and therefore very difficult to correct for distortion by traditional means. On the upside, the large negative element also limits the oblique cos^{4}θ light falloff of regular wide-angle lenses.

Retrofocus design also influenced non-retrofocus lenses. For example, Ludwig Bertele's Zeiss Biogon 21mm f/4.5, released in 1954 for the Contax IIA (1950, West Germany) 35mm RF, and its evolution, the Zeiss Hologon 15mm f/8 of 1969, fixed to the Zeiss Ikon Hologon Ultrawide (West Germany), were roughly symmetrical designs. However, each half can visualized as retrofocus. The Biogon and Hologon designs take advantage of the large negative elements to limit the light falloff of regular wide angle lenses. With a 110° field of view, the Hologon would otherwise have had a 3¼ stop corner light falloff, which is wider than the exposure latitude of contemporaneous films. Nonetheless, the Hologon had a standard accessory radially graduated 2 stop neutral density filter to ensure completely even exposure. The distance from the Hologon's rear element to the film was only 4.5 mm.

Many normal perspective lenses for today's digital SLRs are retrofocus, because their smaller-than-35mm-film-frame image sensors require much shorter focal lengths to maintain equivalent fields of view, but the continued use of 35mm SLR lens mounts require long back-focus distances.

==== Fisheye lens ====
Beck Hill Sky

A fisheye lens is a special type of ultra-wide angle retrofocus lens with little or no attempt to correct for rectilinear distortion. Most fisheyes produce a circular image with a 180° field of view. The term fisheye comes from the supposition that a fish looking up at the sky would see in the same way.

The first fisheye lens was the Beck Hill Sky (or Cloud; UK) lens of 1923. Robin Hill intended it to be pointed straight up to take 360° azimuth barrel distorted hemispheric sky images for scientific cloud cover studies. It used a bulging negative meniscus to compress the 180° field to 60° before passing the light through a stop to a moderate wide angle lens. The Sky was 21mm f/8 producing 63 mm-diameter images. Pairs were used at 500 meter spacing producing stereoscopes for the British Meteorological Office.

Fisheye lenses continued to be used chiefly for scientific applications; however, the first widely-seen fisheye photograph was taken by Ed Clark and published in an April 1957 issue of LIFE magazine, showing the United States Senate caucus room; a few months later in the same magazine, Ralph Crane published a photograph he had taken of pole-vaulter Bob Gutowski using a Nikon fisheye camera. The first widely-available fisheye lens for 35mm cameras was the Fisheye-Nikkor 8 mm f/8 from Nikon, released in 1962, which produced circular images similar to those popularized by the LIFE photographers; that lens served as the "eye" of the HAL 9000 computer from the film 2001: A Space Odyssey, although scenes depicting HAL's point of view were taken by a Fairchild-Curtis lens designed for Cinerama 360 cameras. Asahi Optical followed by releasing the first "full-frame" fisheye lens in 1963, the Fish-eye-Takumar 18 mm f/11, which had a 180° angle of view across the frame diagonal. Fisheye photographs became popular for album covers starting from the mid-60s and have continued to influence the music industry.

Note, it is impossible to have 180° rectilinear coverage because of light falloff. 120° (12mm focal length for the 35mm film format) is about the practical limit for retrofocus designs; 90° (21mm focal length) for non-retrofocus lenses.

=== Macro lens ===
Strictly speaking, macrophotography is technical photography with actual image size ranging from near life-size (1:1 image-to-object ratio) to about ten or twenty times life-size (10 or 20:1 ratio, at which photomicrography begins). "Macro" lenses were originally regular formula lenses optimized for close object distances, mounted on a long extension tube or bellows accessory to provide the necessary close focusing, but preventing focusing on distant objects.

However, the Kilfitt Makro-Kilar 4 cm f/3.5 (West Germany/Liechtenstein) of 1955 for Exakta 35mm SLRs changed the everyday meaning of macro lens. It was the first lens to provide continuous close focusing. Version D of Heinz Kilfitt's (West Germany) Makro-Kilar focused from infinity to 1:1 ratio (life-size) at two inches; version E, to 1:2 ratio (half life-size) at four inches. The Makro-Kilar was a Tessar mounted in an extra long draw triple helical. SLR cameras were best for macro lenses because SLRs do not suffer from viewfinder parallax error at very close focus distances.

Designing close-up lenses is not really that hard – an image size that is close to object size increases symmetry. The Goerz Apo-Artar (Germany/USA) photoengraving process lens was apochromatic in 1904, although ultra-tight quality control helped. It is getting a sharp image continuously from infinity to close-up that is hard – before the Makro-Kilar, lenses generally did not continuously focus to closer than 1:10 ratio. Most SLR lens lines continue to include moderate aperture macro lenses optimized for high magnification. However, their focal lengths tend to be longer than the Makro-Kilar to allow more working distance.

"Macro zoom" lenses began appearing in the 1970s, but traditionalists object to calling most of them macro because they stray too far from the technical definition – they usually do not focus closer than 1:4 ratio with relatively poor image quality.

=== Supplementary lens ===
Zeiss Tele-Mutar and Wide-Angle-Mutar

Schneider Retina-Xenon C system

A supplementary lens is an accessory lens clipped, screwed or bayoneted to the front of a main lens that alters the lens' effective focal length. If it is a positive (converging) only supplement, it will shorten the focal length and reset the infinity focus of the lens to the focal length of the supplementary lens. These so-called close-up lenses are often uncorrected single element menisci, but are a cheap way to provide close focusing for an otherwise limited focus range lens.

An afocal attachment is a more sophisticated supplementary lens. It is a so-called Galilean telescope accessory mounted to the front of a lens that alters the lens' effective focal length without moving the focal plane. There are two types: the telephoto and the wide angle. The telephoto type is a front positive plus rear negative cell combination that increases the image size; the wide angle has a front negative and rear positive arrangement to reduce the image size. Both have cell separation equal to cell focal length difference to maintain the focal plane.

Since afocal attachments are not an integral part of the main lens' formula, they degrade image quality and are not appropriate for critical applications. However, they have been available for amateur motion picture, video and still cameras since the 1950s. Before the zoom lens, afocal attachments were a way to provide a cheap sort of interchangeable lens system to an otherwise fixed lens camera. In the zoom lens era, they are a cheap way to extend the reach of a zoom.

Some afocal attachments, such as the Zeiss Tele-Mutar 1.5× and Wide-Angle-Mutar 0.7× (1963, West Germany) for various fixed lens Franke and Heidecke Rolleiflex brand 120 roll film twin-lens reflex cameras, were of higher quality and price, but still not equal to true interchangeable lenses in image quality. The very bulky Mutars could change a Rolleiflex 3.5E/C's Heidosmat 75mm f/2.8 and Zeiss Planar 75mm f/3.5 (1956, West Germany) viewing and imaging lenses into 115mm and 52mm equivalents. Afocal attachments are still available for digital point-and-shoot cameras.

The Kodak Retina IIIc and IIc (USA/West Germany) collapsable lens 35mm rangefinder cameras of 1954 took the supplementary lens idea to the extreme with their interchangeable lens "components." This system allowed swapping the front cell component of their standard Schneider Retina-Xenon C 50mm f/2 lenses (a Double Gauss) for Schneider Retina-Longar-Xenon 80mm f/4 long-focus and Schneider Retina-Curtar-Xenon 35mm f/5.6 wide-angle components. Component lens design is tightly constrained by the need to reuse the rear cell and the lenses are extremely bulky, range limited and complex compared with fully interchangeable lenses, but the Retina's interlens Synchro-Compur leaf shutter restricted lens options.

=== Zoom lens ===
Voigtländer-Zoomar 36-82mm f/2.8

The zoom lens evolved from the focal length compression elements found in telephoto lens. Varying the spacing between a telephoto's front positive and rear negative cells changes the lens' magnification. However, this will upset focus and aberration optimization, and introduce pincushion distortion. A real zoom lens needs a compensating cell to push the focal plane back to the appropriate place and took decades of development to become practical. The earliest zooms came out between 1929 and 1932 for professional motion picture cameras and were called "Traveling," "Vario" and "Varo" lenses.

The first zoom lens for still cameras was the Voigtländer-Zoomar 36-82mm f/2.8 (USA/West Germany) of 1959, for Voigtländer Bessamatic series (1959, West Germany) 35mm leaf shutter SLRs. It was designed by Zoomar in the United States and manufactured by Kilfitt in West Germany for Voigtländer. The Zoomar 36-82 was very large and heavy for the focal length – 95mm filter size. Frank Back (Germany/USA) was the early champion of zoom lenses and his Zoomars would hurl far into the future the lance of zoom lens development and popularity, starting with his original Zoomar 17-53mm f/2.9 (1946, USA) for 16mm motion picture cameras. The image quality of early zoom lenses could be very poor – the Zoomar's has been described as "pretty rotten." It wasn't until as recently as 1986 that the Pentax Zoom 70 became the first consumer point and shoot camera to integrate a practical zoom lens.

==== Development ====
Vivitar Series 1 70-210mm f/3.5

Fuji Fujinon-Z 43-75mm f/3.5-4.5

Sigma 21-35mm f/3.5-4

Most early zoom lenses produced mediocre, or even poor, images. They were adequate for low resolution requirements such television and amateur movie cameras, but usually not still photography. For example, Nippon Kogaku always apologetically acknowledged that Takashi Higuchi's Zoom-Nikkor Auto 43-86mm f/3.5, the first popular zoom lens, did not meet its normal image quality standards. However, efforts to improve them were ongoing.

In 1974, the Ponder & Best (Opcon/Kino) Vivitar Series 1 70-210mm f/3.5 Macro Focusing Zoom (USA/Japan) was widely hailed as the first professional-level quality very close focusing "macro" zoom lens for 35mm SLRs. Ellis Betensky's (USA) Opcon Associates perfected the Series 1's fifteen element/ten group/four cell formula by calculations on the latest digital computers. Freed from the drudgery of hand computation in the 1960s, designs of such variety and quality only dreamt of by earlier generations of optical engineers became possible. Modern computer created zoom designs may be so complex that they have no resemblance to any of the classical human created designs.

The optical zooming action of the Series 1 was different from most earlier zooms such as the Zoomar. The Zoomar was an "optically compensated" zoom. Its zooming cell and focal plane compensating cell were fixed together and moved together with a stationary cell in between. The Series 1 was a "mechanically compensated" zoom. Its zooming cell was mechanically cammed with a focal plane compensating cell and moved at different rates. The tradeoff for greater optical design freedom was this increase in mechanical complexity.

The external controls of the Series 1 were also mechanically more complex than the Zoomar. Most early zooms had separate twist control rings to vary the focus and focal length – a "two touch" zoom. The Series 1 used a single control ring: twist to focus, push-pull to zoom – a "one touch" zoom. For a short time, about 1980-1985, one-touch zooms were the dominant type, because of their ease of handling. However, the arrival of interchangeable lens autofocus cameras in 1985 with the Minolta Maxxum 7000 (Japan; called Alpha 7000 in Japan, 7000 AF in Europe) necessarily forced the decoupling of focusing and zooming controls and two touch zooms made an instant comeback.

In 1977, zoom lenses had advanced far enough that the Fuji Fujinon-Z 43-75mm f/3.5-4.5 (Japan) became the first zoom lens to be sold as the primary lens for an interchangeable lens camera, the Fujica AZ-1 (1977, Japan) 35mm SLR, instead of a prime.

Small quick framing "supernormal" zooms of around 35-70mm focal length became popular 50mm substitutes in Japan by 1980. However, they never gained much of a foothold in the United States, although 70-210mm telephoto zooms were very popular as second lenses. The first auto-everything 35mm point-and-shoot camera with built-in zoom lens, the camera type that dominated the 1990s, was the Asahi Optical Pentax IQZoom (1987, Japan) with Pentax Zoom 35-70mm f/3.5-6.7 Tele-Macro.

The next landmark zoom was the Sigma 21-35mm f/3.5-4 (Japan) of 1981. It was the first super-wide angle zoom lens for still cameras (most 35mm SLRs). Previously, combining the complexities of rectilinear super-wide angle lenses, retrofocus lenses and zoom lenses seemed impossible. The Sigma's all-moving eleven element/seven group/three cell formula was a triumph of computer-aided design and multicoating.

Along with optical complexity, the mechanical complexity of the Sigma, with three cells moving at differing rates, required the latest in manufacturing technology. Super-wide angle zoom lenses are even more complicated for most of today's digital SLRs, because the usually smaller-than-35mm-film-frame image sensors require much shorter focal lengths to maintain equivalent fields of view, but the continued use of 35mm SLR lens mounts require the same large back-focus distances.

Japanese zoom interchangeable lens production surpassed that of prime lenses in 1982.

==== Widespread use ====
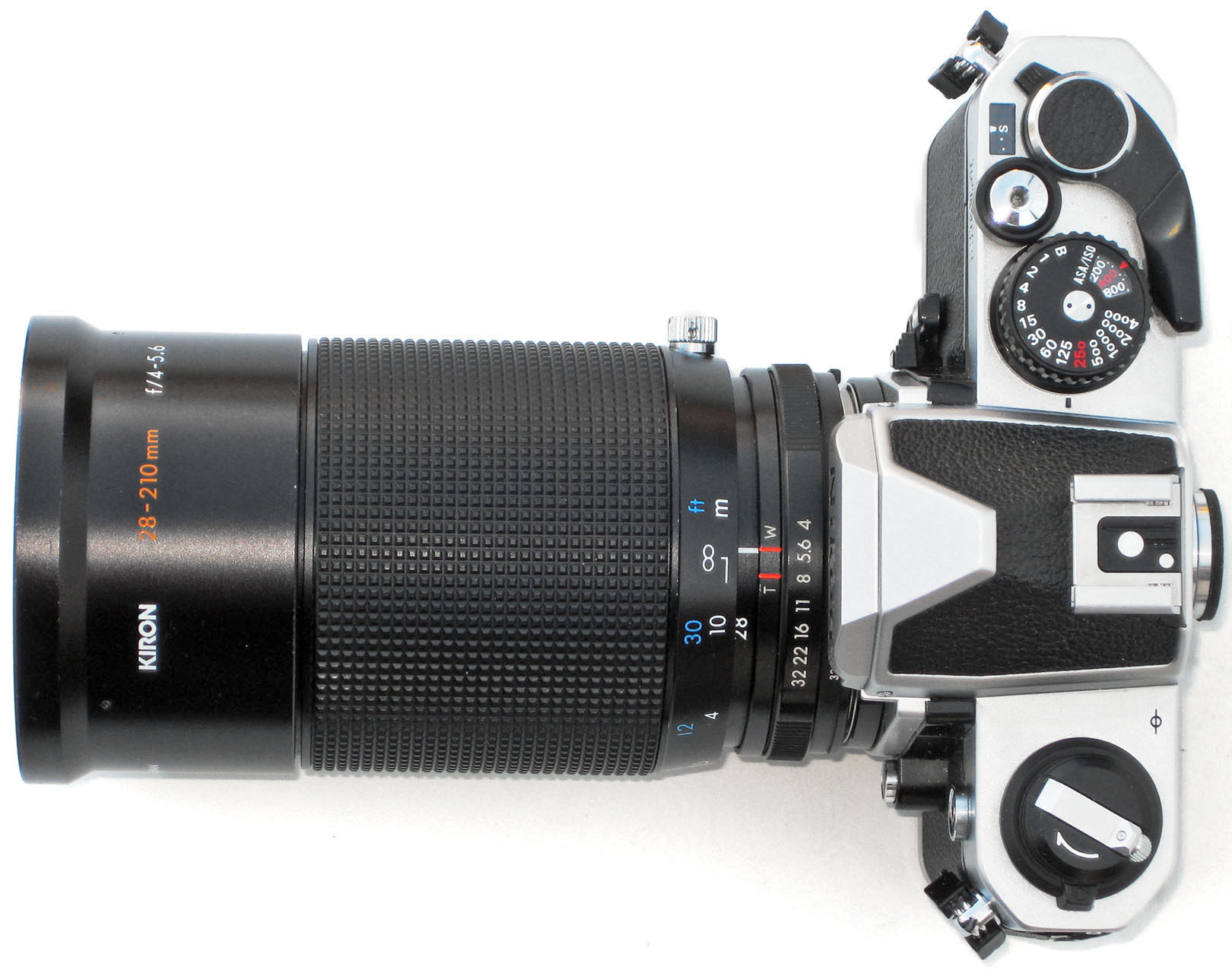
Kiron 28-210mm f/4-5.6 (on a Nikon FM2N)

Tokina SZ-X 70-210mm f/4-5.6 SD

The need for one lens able to do everything, or at least as much as possible, was an influence on lens design in the last quarter century. The Kino Precision Kiron 28-210mm f/4-5.6 (Japan) of 1985 was the first very large ratio focal length zoom lens for still cameras (most 35mm SLRs). The fourteen element/eleven group Kiron was first 35mm SLR zoom lens to extend from standard wide angle to long telephoto (sometimes referred to as "superzoom"), able to replace 28, 35, 50, 85, 105, 135 and 200mm prime lenses, albeit restricted to a small variable maximum aperture to keep size, weight and cost within reason (129×75 mm, 840 g, 72mm filter, US$359 list).

Early 35mm SLR zooms focal length ratios rarely exceeded 3 to 1, because of unacceptable image quality issues. However, zoom versatility, despite increasing optical complexity and stricter manufacturing tolerances, continued to increase. Despite their many image quality compromises, convenient wide range zoom lenses (sometimes with ratios over 10 to 1 and four or five independently moving cells) became common on amateur level 35mm SLRs by the late 1990s. They remain a standard lens on today's amateur digital SLRs, attaining up to 19X. Wide range "superzooms" also sell by the millions on digital point-and-shoots.

The desire for an all-in-one lens is hardly a new phenomenon. Convertible lenses, still used by large format film photographers (insofar as large format photography is used), consisting of two cells that could be used individually or screwed together, giving three-lenses-in-one, date back to at least the Zeiss Convertible Protar (Germany) of 1894.

Convenience of a different sort was the major feature of the Tokina SZ-X 70-210mm f/4-5.6 SD (Japan) of 1985. It was the first ultra-compact zoom (85×66 mm, 445 g, 52mm filter); half the size of most earlier 70-210 zooms (the third generation Vivitar Series 1 70-210mm f/2.8-4 [1984, USA/Japan] was 139×70 mm, 860 g, 62mm filter). Like the Kiron 28-210mm, the twelve element/eight group/three cell Tokina had a small variable maximum aperture, but added low dispersion glass and a new bidirectional nonlinear zooming action, to bring size and weight down to an absolute minimum.

Small aperture 35mm format lenses were made practical by the availability of snapshot quality, high sensitivity ISO 400 color films in the 1980s (and ISO 800 in the 1990s), as well as cameras with built-in flash units. During the 1990s, point-and-shoot cameras with compact small aperture zooms were the dominant camera type. Compact variable aperture zoom (some wide range, some not) lenses remain a standard lens on today's digital point-and-shoot cameras.

Note, many of today's wide range zoom lenses are not "parfocal"; that is, not true zooms. They are "varifocal" – the focus point shifts with the focal length – but are easier to design and manufacture. The focus shift usually goes unnoticed as they are mounted on autofocus cameras that will automatically refocus.

=== Rise of Japanese optical industry ===
Nippon Kogaku Nikkor-P Auto 10.5cm f/2.5

Nippon Kogaku Zoom-Nikkor Auto 43-86mm f/3.5

Japanese photographic lens production dates from 1931 with the Konishiroku (Konica) Hexar 10.5 cm f/4.5 for the Konishiroku Tropical Lily small plate camera. The Japanese advanced quickly and were able to manufacture very high quality lenses by 1950 – LIFE magazine photographer David Douglas Duncan's "discovery" of Nikkor lenses is an oft-told tale.

In 1954, the Japan Camera Industry Association (JCIA) began promoting the development of a high quality photographic industry to increase exports as part of Japan's post-World War II economic recovery. To that end, the Japan Machine Design Center (JMDC) and Japan Camera Inspection Institute (JCII) banned the slavish copying of designs and the export of low quality photographic equipment, enforced by a testing program before issuance of shipping permits.

By the end of the 1950s, the Japanese were seriously challenging the Germans. For example, the Nippon Kogaku Nikkor-P Auto 10.5 cm f/2.5 of 1959, for the Nikon F 35mm SLR (1959), is reputed to be one of the best portrait lenses ever made, with superb sharpness and bokeh. It originated as the Nikkor-P 10.5 cm f/2.5 (1954) for the Nikon S series 35mm RF, was optically upgraded in 1971 and available until 2006.

In 1963, the Tokyo Kogaku RE Auto-Topcor 5.8 cm f/1.4 came out along with the Topcon RE Super/Super D (1963) 35mm SLR. The Topcor is reputed to be one of the best normal lenses ever made. The Nikkor and the Topcor were sure signs of the Japanese optical industry eclipsing the Germans'. Topcon in particular was highly avant-garde in producing two ultra-fast lenses by 1960 - the R-Topcor 300 F2.8 (1958) and the R-Topcor 135 F2 (1960). The former was not eclipsed until 1976. Germany had been the optical leader for a century, but the Germans turned very conservative after World War II; failing to achieve unity of purpose, innovate or respond to market conditions. Japanese camera production surpassed West German output in 1962.

Early Japanese lenses were not novel designs: the Hexar was a Tessar; the Nikkor was a Sonnar; the Topcor was a Double Gauss. They began breaking new ground around 1960: the Nippon Kogaku Auto-Nikkor 8.5–25 cm f/4-4.5 (1959), for the Nikon F, was the first telephoto zoom lens for 35mm still cameras (and second zoom after the Zoomar), the Canon 50mm f/0.95 (1961), for the Canon 7 35mm RF, with its superwide aperture, was the first Japanese lens a photographer might lust after, and the Nippon Kogaku Zoom-Nikkor Auto 43-86mm f/3.5 (1963), originally fixed on the Nikkorex Zoom 35mm SLR, later released for the Nikon F, was the first popular zoom lens, despite mediocre image quality.

German lenses disappear from this history at this point. After ailing throughout the 1960s, such famous German nameplates as Kilfitt, Leitz, Meyer, Schneider, Steinheil, Voigtländer and Zeiss went bankrupt, were sold off, contracted production to East Asia or became boutique brands in the 1970s. Names for design types also disappear at this point. Apparently the Japanese are not fans of lens names, they use only brand names and feature codes for their lens lines.

The JDMC/JCII testing program, having fulfilled its goals, ended in 1989 and its gold "PASSED" sticker passed into history. The JCIA/JCII morphed into the Camera & Imaging Products Association (CIPA) in 2002.

=== Catadioptric "mirror" lens ===
Example of a catadioptric lens that uses rear surfaced mangin mirrors (Minolta RF Rokkor-X 250mm f/5.6)

Catadioptric photographic lenses (or "CAT" for short) combine many historical inventions such as the Catadioptric Mangin mirror (1874), Schmidt camera (1931), and the Maksutov telescope (1941) along with Laurent Cassegrain's Cassegrain telescope (1672). The Cassegrain system folds the light path and the convex secondary acts as a telephoto element, making the focal length even longer than the folded system and extending the light cone to a focal point well behind the primary mirror so it can reach the film plane of the attached camera. The Catadioptric system, where a spherical reflector is combined with a lens with the opposite spherical aberration, corrects the common optical errors of a reflector such as the Cassegrain system, making it suitable for devices that need a large aberration free focal plane (cameras).

The first general purpose photographic catadioptric lens was Dmitri Maksutov 1944 MTO (Maksutov Tele-Objectiv) 500mm f/8 Maksutov–Cassegrain configuration, adapted from his 1941 Maksutov telescope. Designs followed using other optical configurations including Schmidt configuration and solid catadioptric designs (made from a single glass cylinder with a maksutov or aspheric form polished into the front face and the back spherical surface silvered to make the "mirror"). In 1979 Tamron was able to produce a very compact light weight catadioptric by using rear surface silvered mirrors, a "Mangin mirror" configuration that saved on mass by having the aberration corrected by the light passing through the mirror itself.

The catadioptric camera lens' heyday was the 1960s and 1970s, before apochromatic refractive telephoto lenses. CATs of 500 mm focal length were common; some were as short as 250mm, such as the Minolta RF Rokkor-X 250mm f/5.6 (Japan) of 1979 (a Mangin mirror CAT roughly the size of a 50mm f/1.4 lens).

Dedicated photographic mirror lenses fell out of favor in the 1980s for various reasons. However, commercial reflector astronomical Maksutov–Cassegrain and Schmidt–Cassegrain telescopes with 14 to 20 inch (or even larger) diameter primary mirrors are available. With an accessory camera adapter, they are 4000mm f/11 to f/8 equivalent.

=== Movable element prime lens ===
Nippon Kogaku Nikkor-N Auto 24mm f/2.8

The complex internal movements of zoom were also adapted to prime lens designs. Traditionally, prime lenses for rigid cameras were focused closer by physically shifting the entire lens toward the object in a helical or rack and pinion mount. (Cameras with bellows expanded the bellows to shift the lens forward.) However, element spacing for best aberration correction is different for near versus far objects. In 1948, Max Reiss of Eastman Kodak patented a lens with variable element spacing to control aberrations at closer distances, noting that mathematical proofs had demonstrated "a change in spherical aberration with changing object distance is unavoidable in coma-corrected objectives".

Therefore, starting in the late 1960s, some prime lenses began using "floating elements" – zoom-like differential cell movement in nested helicals for better close-up performance. For example, retrofocus wide angle lenses tend to have excessive spherical aberration and astigmatism at close focusing distances and so the Nikkor-N Auto 24mm f/2.8 (Japan) of 1967 for Nikon 35mm SLRs had a Close Range Correction system with a rear three element cell that moved separately from the main lens to maintain good wide aperture image quality to a close focus distance of 30 cm/1 ft.

Nippon Kogaku Nikkor 200mm f/2 ED IF

Some prime lenses, primarily telephoto lenses, were introduced with "internal focusing," (IF) such as the Nikkor 400mm f/3.5 IF-ED (Japan, 1976) and Nikkor 200mm f/2 IF-ED (Japan, 1977). Focusing by moving only a few internal elements, instead of the entire lens, ensured the lens' weight balance would not be upset during focusing.

Internal focusing was originally popular in heavyweight, wide-aperture telephoto lenses for professional press, sports and wildlife photographers, because it made their handling easier. IF was extended to many lenses in the autofocus era, because moving a few internal elements instead of the entire lens for focusing conserved limited battery power and eased the strain on the focusing motor.

Floating elements and internal focusing produces a zooming effect and the effective focal length of an FE or IF lens at closest focusing distance can be one-third shorter than the marked focal length.

== Modern developments (1980+) ==
=== Inexpensive asphere ===
Kodak (Disc) aspheric 12.5mm f/2.8

Kodak Ektar 25mm f/1.9

Typical lens elements have spherically curved surfaces. However, this causes off-axis light to be focused closer to the lens than axial rays (spherical aberration); especially severe in wide angle or wide aperture lenses. This can be prevented by using elements with convoluted aspheric curves. Although this was theoretically proven by René Descartes in 1637, the grinding and polishing of aspheric glass surfaces was extremely difficult and expensive.

The first camera lens with an inexpensive mass-produced molded glass aspheric element was the unnamed 12.5mm f/2.8 lens built into the Kodak Disc 4000, 6000 and 8000 (USA) cameras in 1982. It was said to be capable of resolving 250 lines per millimeter. The four element lens was a Triplet with an added rear field-flattener. The Kodak Disc cameras contained very sophisticated engineering. They also had a lithium battery, microchip electronics, programmed autoexposure and motorized film wind for US$68 to US$143 list. It was the Disc film format that was unable to record 250 lpm.

Kodak began using mass-produced plastic aspheres in viewfinder optics in 1957, and the Kodak Ektramax (USA) Pocket Instamatic 110 cartridge film camera had a built-in Kodak Ektar 25mm f/1.9 lens (also a four element Triplet) with a molded plastic aspheric element in 1978 for US$87.50 list. Plastic is easy to mold into complex shapes that can include an integral mounting flange. However, glass is superior to plastic for lens making in many respects – its refractive index, temperature stability, mechanical strength and variety is higher.

=== Autofocus lens ===
Since autofocus is primarily an electromechanical feature of the camera, not an optical one of the lens, it did not greatly influence lens design. The only changes wrought by AF were mechanical adaptations: the popularity of "internal focusing", the switch back to "two touch" zooming and the inclusion of AF motors or driveshafts, gearing and electronic control microchips inside the lens shell.

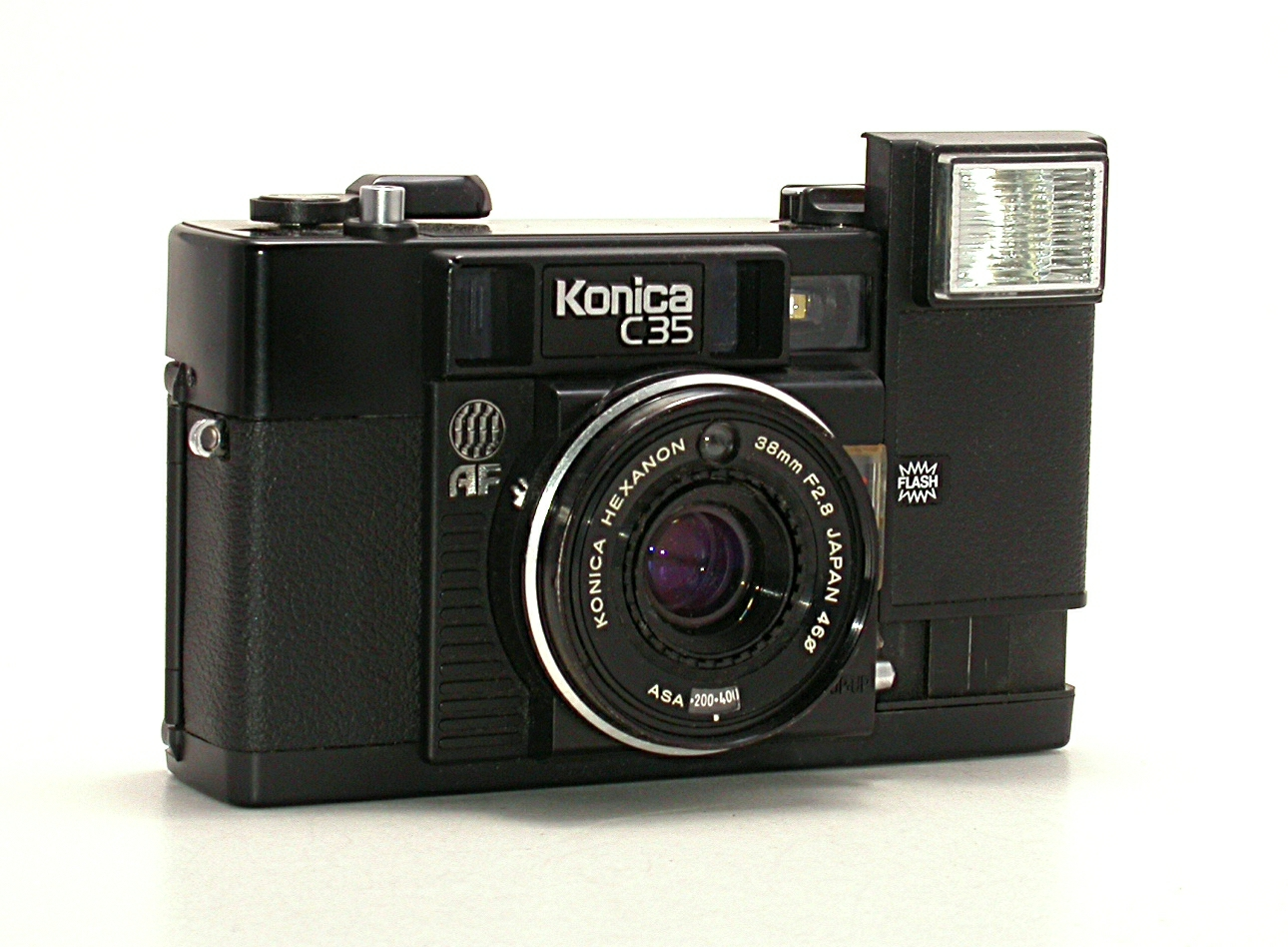
Landmark Konica C35 AF point-and-shoot camera

The first autofocus lens for a still camera was the Konishiroku Konica Hexanon 38mm f/2.8 built into the Konica C35 AF (1977, Japan) 35mm point-and-shoot; the first autofocus lens for an SLR camera was the unnamed 116mm f/8 built into the Polaroid SX-70 Sonar (1978, USA) instant film SLR; the first interchangeable autofocus SLR lens was the Ricoh AF Rikenon 50mm f/2 (1980, Japan, for any Pentax K mount 35mm SLR), which had a self-contained passive electronic rangefinder AF system in a bulky top-mounted box; the first dedicated autofocus lens mount was the five electrical contact pin Pentax K-F mount on the Asahi Optical Pentax ME F (1981, Japan) 35mm SLR camera with a TTL phase detection AF system for its unique SMC Pentax AF 35mm-70mm f/2.8 Zoom Lens; the first built-in TTL autofocus SLR lens was the Opcon/Komine/Honeywell Vivitar Series 1 200mm f/3.5 (1984, USA/Japan, for most 35mm SLRs), which had a self-contained TTL passive phase detection AF system in an underslung box and the first complete autofocus lens line was the twelve Minolta AF A mount lenses (24mm f/2.8, 28mm f/2.8, 50mm f/1.4, 50mm f/1.7, 50mm f/2.8 Macro, 135mm f/2.8, 300mm f/2.8 APO, 28-85mm f/3.5-4.5, 28-135mm f/4-4.5, 35-70mm f/4, 35-105mm f/3.5-4.5 and 70-210mm f/4) introduced with the Minolta Maxxum 7000 (1985, Japan) 35mm SLR and its TTL passive phase detection AF system.

=== Image-stabilized lens ===
In 1994, the unnamed 38-105mm f/4-7.8 lens built into the Nikon Zoom-Touch 105 VR (Japan) 35mm point-and-shoot camera was the first consumer lens with built-in image stabilization. Its Vibration Reduction system could detect and counteract handheld camera/lens unsteadiness, allowing sharp photographs of static subjects at shutter speeds much slower than normally possible without a tripod. Although image stabilization is an electromechanical breakthrough, not optical, it was the biggest new feature of the 1990s.

The Canon EF 75-300mm f/4-5.6 IS USM (Japan) of 1995 was the first interchangeable lens with built-in image stabilization (called Image Stabilizer; for Canon EOS 35mm SLRs). Image stabilized lenses were initially very expensive and used mostly by professional photographers. Stabilization surged into the amateur digital SLR market in 2006. However, the Konica Minolta Maxxum 7D (Japan) digital SLR introduced the first camera body-based stabilization system in 2004 and there is now a great engineering and marketing battle over whether the system should be lens-based (counter-shift lens elements) or camera-based (counter-shift image sensor).

=== Diffractive optic lens ===
Canon EF 400mm f/4 DO IS USM

With computer-aided design, aspherics, multicoating, very high refraction/low dispersion glass and unlimited budget, it is now possible to control the monochromatic aberrations to almost any arbitrary limit – subject to the absolute diffraction limit demanded by the laws of physics. However, chromatic aberrations remain resistant to these solutions in many practical applications.

In 2001, the Canon EF 400mm f/4 DO IS USM (Japan) was first diffractive optics lens for consumer cameras (for Canon EOS 35mm SLRs). Normally photographic cameras use refractive lenses (with the occasional reflective mirror) as their image forming optical system. The 400 DO lens had a multilayer diffractive element containing concentric circular diffraction gratings to take advantage of diffraction's opposite color dispersion (compared to refraction) to correct chromatic and spherical aberrations with less low dispersion glass, fewer aspheric surfaces and less bulk.

As of 2010, there have been only two expensive professional level diffractive optics lenses for consumer cameras, but if the technology proves useful, prices will drop and its popularity will rise.

=== Lenses in the digital era ===
In 2004, the Kodak (Sigma) DSC Pro SLR/c (USA/Japan) digital SLR was loaded with optical performance profiles on 110 lenses so that the on-board computer could correct the lateral chromatic aberration of those lenses, on-the-fly as part of the capture process. Also in 2004, DxO Labs (France) computer software modules were introduced, loaded with information on specific cameras and lenses, that could correct distortion, vignetting, blur and lateral chromatic aberration of images in post-production.

Lenses have already appeared whose image quality would have been marginal or unacceptable in the film era, but are acceptable in the digital era because the cameras for which they are intended automatically correct their defects. For example, onboard automatic software image correction is a standard feature of 2008's Micro Four Thirds digital format. Images from the 2009 Panasonic 14-140mm f/4-5.8 G VARIO ASPH. MEGA O.I.S. and the 2010 Olympus M. Zuiko Digital 14-150mm f/4-5.6 ED lenses (both Japan) have their severe barrel distortion at the wide angle settings automatically reduced by a Panasonic LUMIX DMC-GH1 and Olympus Pen E-P2, respectively. The Panasonic 14-140mm lens also has its chromatic aberration corrected. (Olympus has not yet implemented chromatic aberration correction.)

== Lens design trends and considerations ==
=== Anti-reflection coating ===
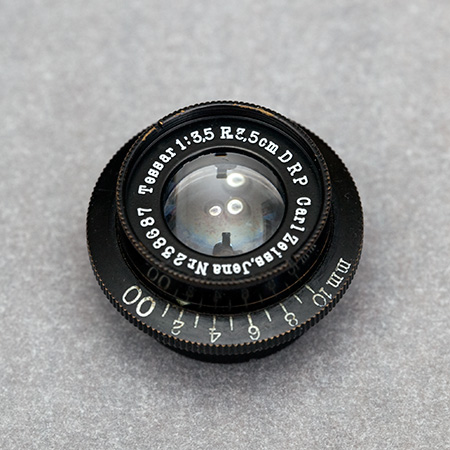
Uncoated Zeiss Tessar; strong reflections are apparent in the front surface; the Tessar design (4 elements in 3 groups) minimized the number of air/glass interfaces

Surface reflection was a major limiting factor in nineteenth century lens design. With a four to eight percent (or more) reflective light loss at every glass-air interface dimming the light transmission plus the reflected light scattering everywhere producing flare, a lens would not be of practical use with more than six or eight losses. This, in turn, limited the number of elements a designer could use to control aberrations.

Some lenses were marked by T-stops (transmission stops) instead of f-stops to indicate the light losses. T-stops were "true" or effective aperture stops and were common for motion picture lenses, so that a cinematographer could ensure that consistent exposures were made by all the different lenses used to make a movie. This was less important for still cameras and only one still lens line was ever marked in T-stops: for the Bell & Howell Foton 35mm rangefinder camera. Bell & Howell was normally a cinematographic equipment maker. The Foton's standard lens was the Taylor, Taylor & Hobson Cooke Amotal Anastigmat 2 inch f/2 (T/2.2) (1948; camera USA; lens UK, a Double Gauss). The quarter stop difference between f/2 and T/2.2 means that 21% of the light is lost to reflection.

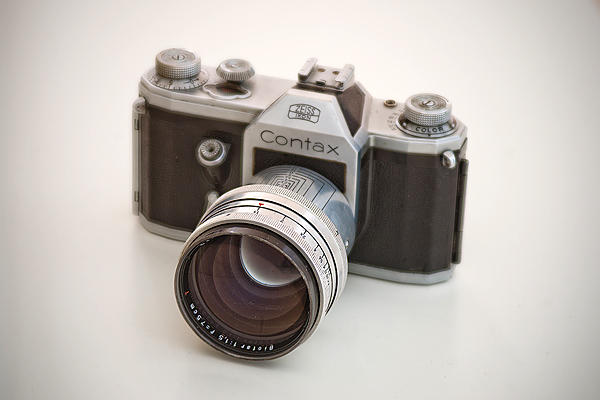
Zeiss Biotar 7.5 cm f/1.5 with Smakula's coating, indicated by red T.

In 1886/1890 the natural phenomenon was noticed by Lord Rayleigh (Rayleigh's Film) and later by Dennis Taylor in 1896, that some lenses with glass tarnished by age counter-intuitively produced brighter images. Investigation revealed that the oxidation layer suppressed surface reflections by destructive interference. Lenses with glass elements artificially "single-coated" by vacuum deposition of a very thin layer (approximately 130-140 nanometers) of magnesium or calcium fluoride to suppress surface reflections were invented by Alexander Smakula working for Zeiss in 1935 and first sold in 1939. These anti-reflection coatings could cut reflection by two-thirds.

Anti-reflection coatings were of immediate interest to Technicolor Corporation, which ordered the first commercial coated projection lenses from Bausch and Lomb for 25 Loew theatres in the larger US cities for the first showings of Gone with the Wind where "improvements in screen illumination, image contrast, and sharpness of focus" were noted. "Similar improvements were noticed on professional camera lenses. A typical uncoated high-speed motion picture anastigmat lens, such as the Astro Pan-Tachar, suffered light losses in excess of 41 percent due to reflections from the eight air-to-glass surfaces comprising its lens formula." Due to the effective increase in light transmission of 1 stop, f/2.3 lenses could replace f/1.6 lenses, giving the same brightness with a smaller aperture and therefore superior optical quality and definition, and increased depth of field.

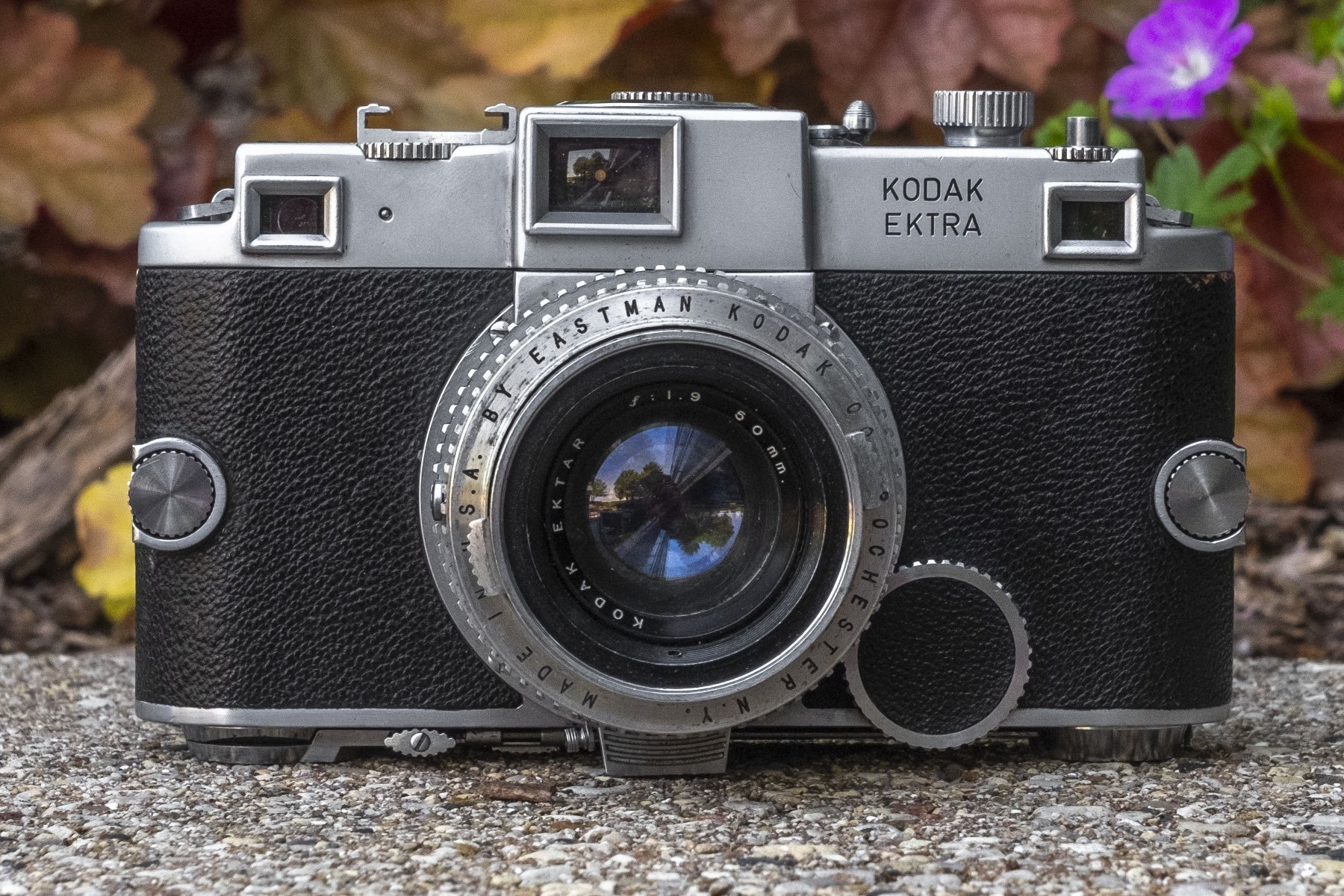
Kodak Ektra with coated Ektar 50mm f/1.9

In 1941, the Kodak Ektra (USA) 35mm RF was introduced with the first complete antireflection coated lens line for a consumer camera: the Kodak Ektar 35mm f/3.3, 50mm f/3.5, 50mm f/1.9, 90mm f/3.5, 135mm f/3.8, and 153mm f/4.5. World War II interrupted all consumer camera production and coated lenses did not appear in large numbers until the late 1940s. They became standard for high quality cameras by the early 1950s.

The availability of antireflection coating permitted the Double Gauss to rise to dominance over the Sonnar design. The Sonnar had more popularity before World War II because, before antireflection coating, the Sonnar's construction (three groups with six air-glass surfaces) made it less vulnerable to flare compared to the Double Gauss (four groups and eight air-glass surfaces). Its telephoto effect also made the lens shorter, an important factor for the Leica and Contax 35mm RFs designed to be compact.

As maximum aperture continued to increase, the Double Gauss's greater symmetry promised easier aberration correction. This was especially important for SLRs because, without the parallax error of RFs, they also began offering much closer focusing distances (typically a half meter instead a whole meter). The Double Gauss became the preferred normal lens design in the 1950s with the availability of anti-reflection coating and new generation extra high refractive index rare earth optical glasses. More complicated multilayer coating designs reduced reflections even further and suppressed them across the visual spectrum instead of at only one compromise wavelength. Further, coatings were used to modulate colour balance (transmission) and even contrast (and therefore MTF resolution) across lenses to achieve either consistent performance, or highest efficiency.

Minolta (as Chiyoda Kōgaku Seikō) produced the world's first multicoated consumer photographic lens in 1956 for their 'Minolta 35 Model II' rangefinder camera - the Rokkor 3.5 cm f/3.5 - with their patented Achromatic Coating. New lenses for the 1958 Minolta 35 Model IIB, also used the Achromatic coating, including the Super Rokkor 5 cm f/1.8 and 3.5 cm f/1.8. All other lens surfaces of the 5 cm f/1.8 were single-coated with at least the front-group being multicoated. Although the 3.5 cm f/3.5 lens did not sell well due to the slow aperture, a more modern, multicoated Super Rokkor 3.5 cm f/1.8 was later produced for the 35 IIB shortly before the system was discontinued, and therefore the lens is extremely rare today. A prototype multicoated 5 cm f/1.4 lens was also produced for the discontinued Minolta Sky M-mount rangefinder during its development, though it is not known if the coating was more advanced than that applied to prior lenses.

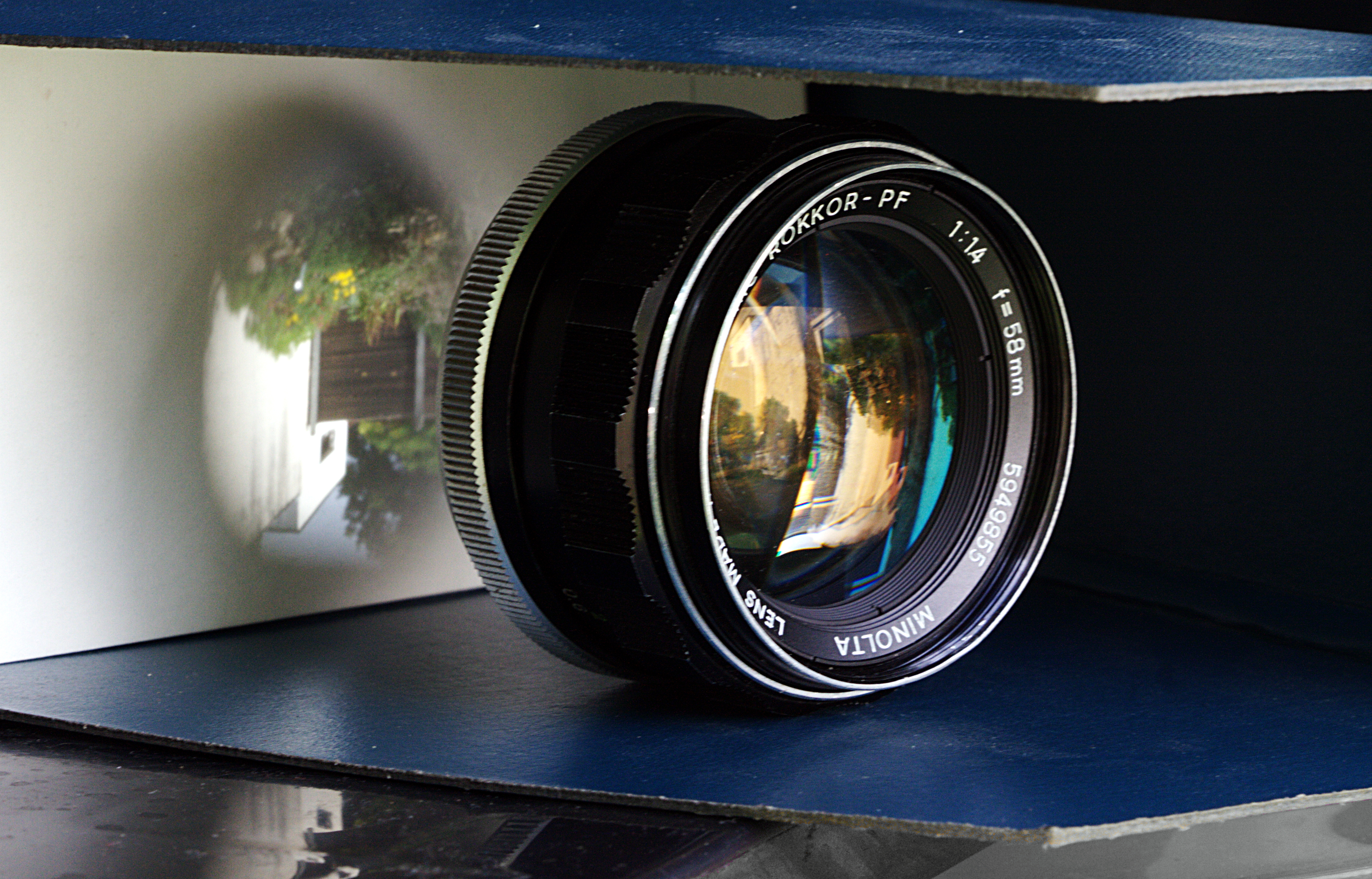
MC Rokkor-PF 58mm f/1.4 with multicoatings

By 1958, single-layer anti-reflection coatings were commonplace on photographic lenses around the world but it was not until 1966 with the introduction of MC ('Meter-Coupled') lenses that all Minolta focal lengths were updated to be fully multicoated, where every optical surface was coated at least twice, with the exposed front surface coating being relatively more scratch-resistant. Prior to this, full multicoating was mainly only applied to the standard 55 or 58mm AR ('Auto-Rokkor') series SLR lenses, between 1958 and 1965. These lenses would be collectively referenced by Minolta as the 'green Rokkor lens' in a 1962 16mm company film promotion titled This is Minolta, because of the predominant green reflection of the front-surface coating which was distinctive from the coatings of other companies. Their Achromatic Coating initially consisted of a two-layer thickness-varying vapour deposit of Magnesium-Fluoride but no 'hard' coating, meaning many examples of the lens today show scarred surfaces due to improper cleaning.

After 1958 when Minolta ended development of interchangeable-lens rangefinder products and focused on interchangeable SLR cameras and lenses, their Achromatic coating was continually updated throughout production with major coating advances being seen in 1966 (MC), 1973 (MC-X), and finally through 1977 to 1984 (MD-I, II, III). Hard-coatings were initially used in the immediate SR SLR series lenses. MC corresponds to the application of achromatic layers on all lens surfaces with new 'ingredients' ('Double Achromatic'), while MC-X introduced even more layers of new 'ingredients' ('Super Achromatic Coating') similar to Pentax's SMC, achieving an empirical improvement of about 1 stop with regards to flare and contrast control of dominating light sources. Beginning with the MD series lenses, additional layers were introduced as standard, although it is clear that for all lenses in any series, improvements in coatings were gradually introduced into production lenses as they were developed. One of the primary marketing claims of Minolta's Achromatic coating was that colour consistency was achieved across all lenses, deprecating the requirement for colour correction filters (common in the 1920s to 1930s) when shooting under constant lighting conditions with different lenses, although the claim has not been substantiated and any colour-consistency difference over competing brands is not clear. It is also not clear if Minolta intended the process name as a reference to achromatic ('neutral') colour (white, grey and black) - or achromatism (a lack of red/blue chromatic aberration).

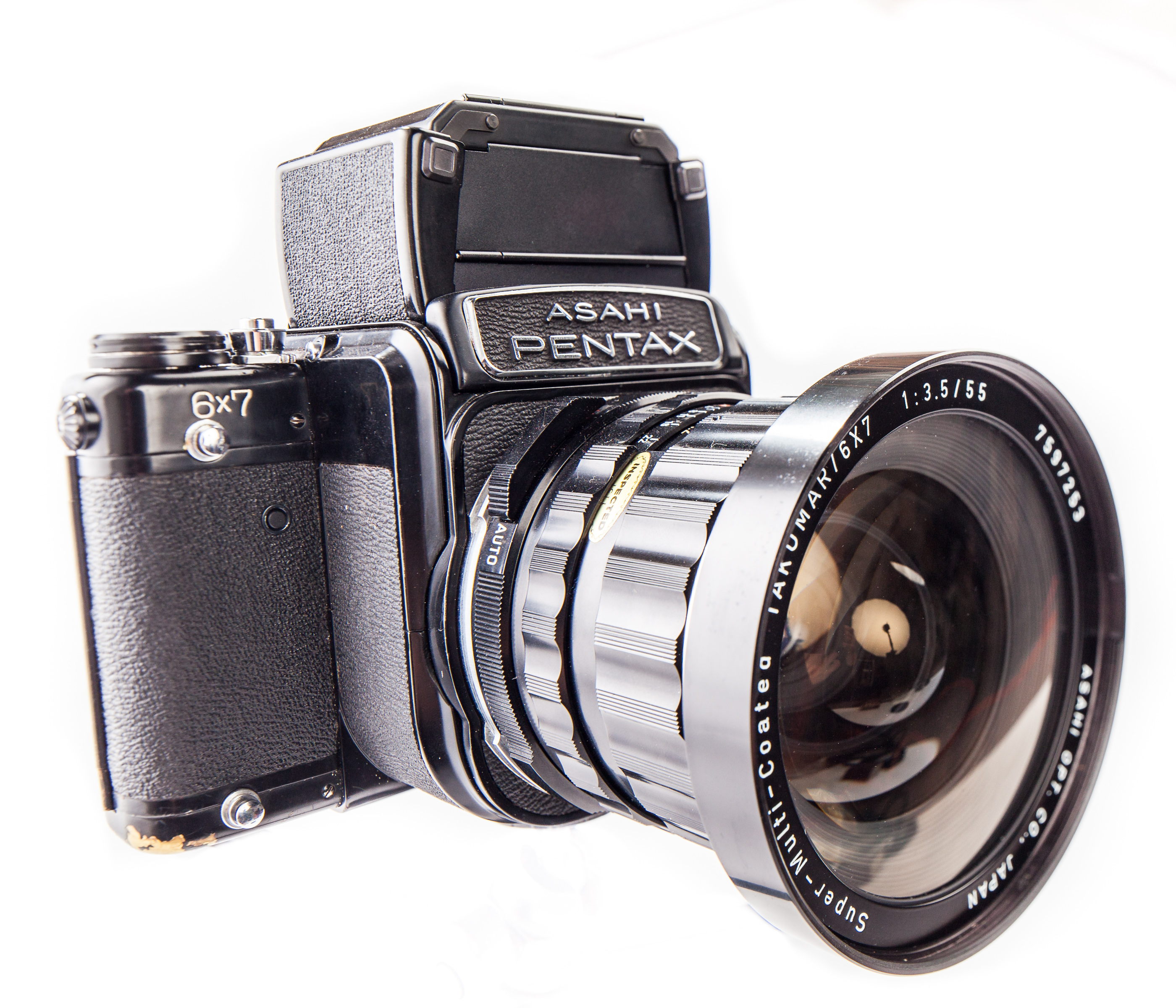
Super-Multi-Coated Takumar 55mm f/3.5 mounted on Pentax 6x7 medium-format SLR

Asahi Optical claimed their SMC Takumar lenses (1971, Japan) to be the first all-multicoated (Super-Multi-Coated) lenses for consumer cameras (M42 screw mount Asahi Pentax SLRs) although all of the other major manufacturers were already using their own proprietary coating similar to Minolta's Double Achromatic process, besides Fujifilm's more advanced 11-layer EBC (Electron Beam Coating) - however EBC was only applied to some commercial movie camera lenses around 1964. SMC was not a Pentax invention, but a patented and licensed process invented by coating pioneers OCLI (Optical Coating Laboratory Incorporated).

Modern highly corrected zoom lenses with fifteen, twenty or more elements would not be possible without multicoating. The transmission efficiency of a modern multicoated lens surface is about 99.7% or better. Then and today, Pentax's SMC coatings were regarded as the most efficient at reducing flare and maintaining contrast. Today, Fuji's Super EBC, Pentax's Super-SMC and Zeiss' T* are regarded as the most advanced photographic lens coatings available, although technical differences are now negligible between manufactures.

Not all layers in multicoating are designed for anti-reflection - some are related to surface adhesion (Argon/Nitrogen Abrasion) or substrate and inter-layers as part of the manufacturing process, exterior 'hard' coating for durability, and λ-filter layers (eg. Tōkyō Kōgaku 'UV Topcor' lenses) for increasing or decreasing transmission of certain wavelengths, and other finishing layers such as oleophobic and hydrophobic coatings to make the surface easy to clean.

Antireflection coating does not relieve the need for a lens hood (a conical tube slipped, clipped, screwed or bayoneted onto the front of a lens to block non-image forming rays from entering the lens) because flare can also result from strong stray light reflecting off of other inadequately blacked internal lens and camera components.

=== Bokeh ===
Minolta Varisoft Rokkor-X 85mm f/2.8

Bokeh is the subjective quality of the out-of-focus or blurry part of the image. Traditionally, time-consuming hand computation limited lens designers to correcting aberrations for the in-focus image only, with little consideration given to the out-of-focus image. Therefore, approaching and outside the specified circle of confusion or depth-of-field, aberrations built up in the out-of-focus image differently in different lens design families. Differences in the out-of-focus image can influence the perception of overall image quality.

There is no precise definition of bokeh and no objective tests for it – as with all aesthetic judgments. However, symmetrical optical formulae such as the Rapid-Rectilinear/Aplanat and the Double Gauss are usually considered pleasing, while asymmetric retrofocus wide angle and telephoto lenses are often thought harsh. The unique "donut" bokeh produced by mirror lenses because of the optical pathway obstruction of the secondary mirror is especially polarizing.

Bokeh examples

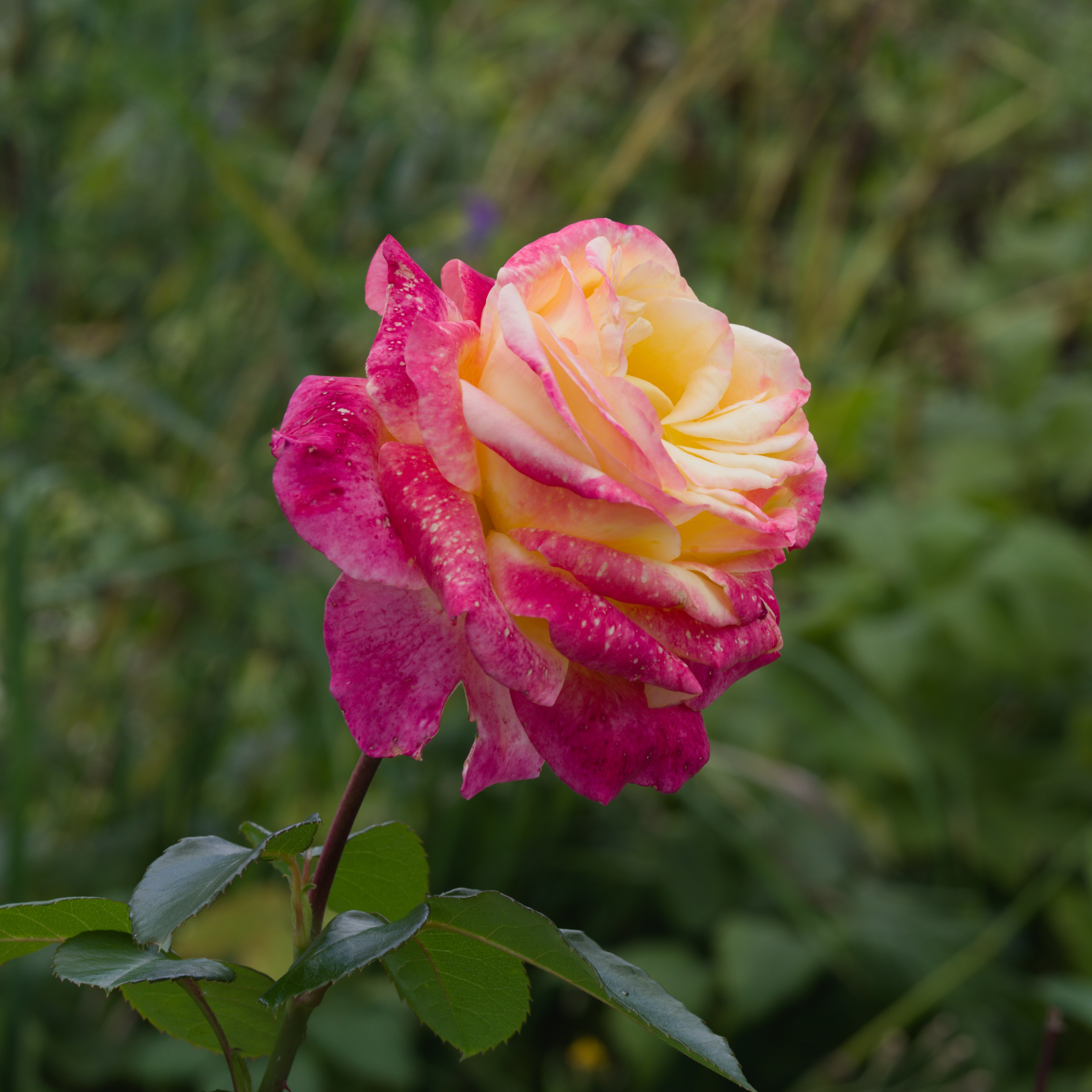
Taken with the Venus Optics Laowa 105mm f/2 STF, a lens designed to create smooth bokeh.

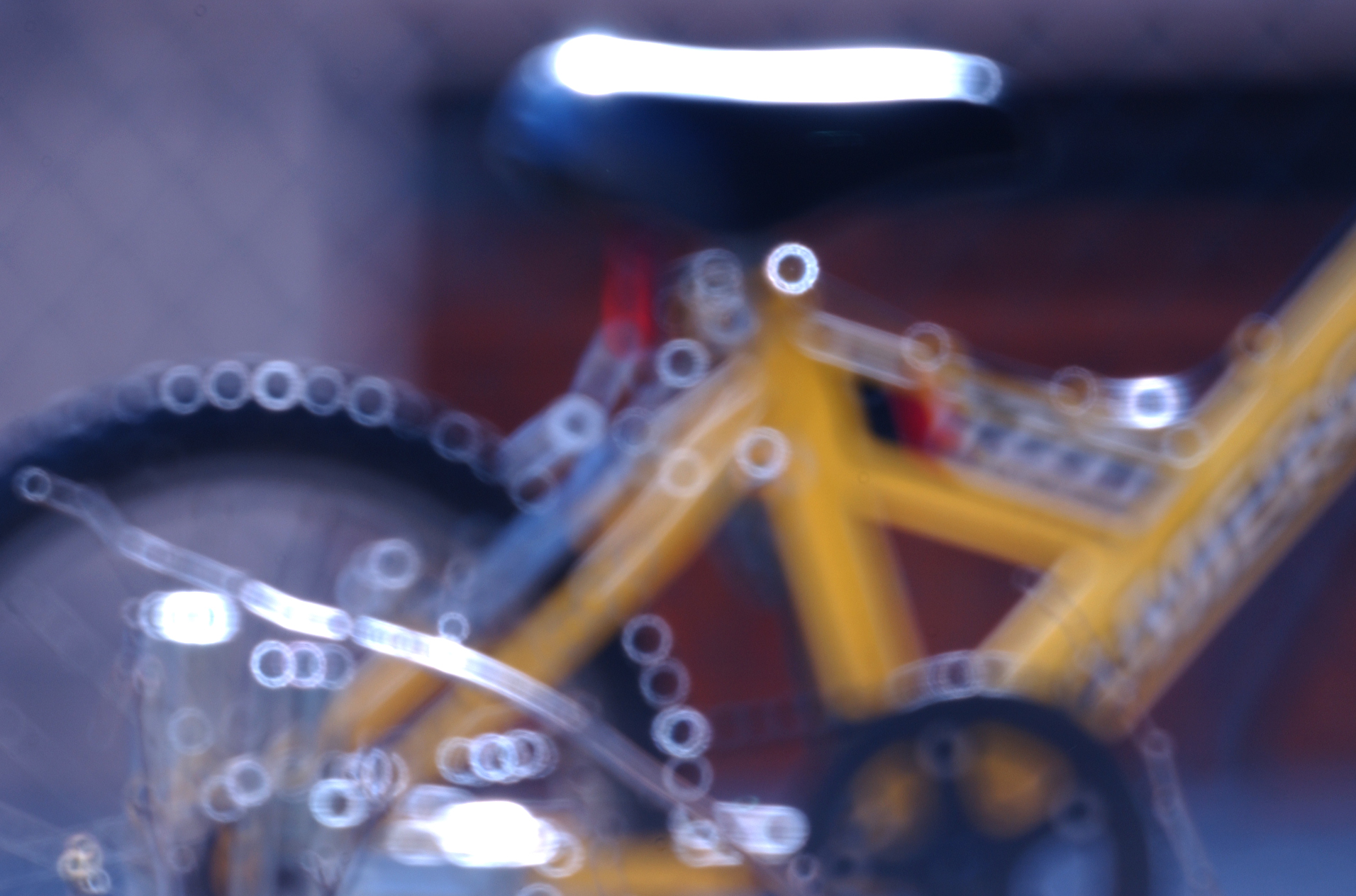
Taken with the Nikon Reflex-Nikkor 500mm f/8, showing the unique out-of-focus specular "donut" highlights typical of a catadioptric lens.

Bokeh refers to the subjective quality of the out-of-focus areas in the photograph.

In the 1970s, as increasing powerful computers proliferated, the Japanese optical houses began to spare computing cycles to study the out-of-focus image. An early result of these explorations was the Minolta Varisoft Rokkor-X 85mm f/2.8 (Japan) of 1978 for Minolta 35mm SLRs. It used floating elements to allow the photographer to deliberately under-correct the spherical aberration of the lens system and render unsharp specular highlights as smoothly fuzzy blobs without affecting focus or other aberrations. Later development included the integration of an apodization element, branded as STF (Smooth Trans-Focus) by Minolta, Sony, and Venus Optics, APD (apodization) by Fujifilm, and DS (Defocus Smoothing) by Canon.

Bokeh is now a lens design parameter for high quality lenses. However, bokeh is irrelevant or the tens of millions of small sensor smartphone and digital point-and-shoot cameras sold every year. Their short focal length and small aperture lenses have large depth-of-field – almost nothing is out of focus. Since wide aperture lenses are rare today, most contemporary photographers confuse bokeh with shallow depth-of-field, having never seen either. Many are even unaware of their existence.

=== Improving standards of quality ===
Lenses have improved over time. On average, lenses are sharper today than they were in the past.

Image format sizes have been steadily shrinking over the last two centuries, while standard print sizes have stayed about the same. The increasing resolving power of new generations of lenses have been used to maintain a relatively equal level of print quality—and therefore higher levels of enlargement—compared with preceding eras. For example: the human eye can resolve about five lines per millimeter at a distance of 30 cm (about one foot). Therefore, a lens must produce a minimum resolution of forty lines per millimeter on a 24×36 mm 35mm film negative if it is to provide a linear enlargement of eight times to an A4 (210×297 mm or 8.27×11.69 inch) print and still appear sharp when viewed at 30 cm.

Optical engineers continually make use of more exact lens formulae. In the nineteenth century, opticians dug to the level of the Seidel aberrations—called mathematically the third-order aberrations—to reach basic anastigmatic correction. By the mid-twentieth century, opticians needed to calculate for the fifth-order aberrations to produce a high-quality lens. Today's lenses require seventh order aberration solutions.

The best photographic lenses of yesteryear were of high image quality (twice the minimum resolution mentioned above) and it may not be possible to conclusively demonstrate the superiority of the best of today's lens without comparing poster size (around 610×914 mm or 24×36 inch) enlargements of exactly the same scene side by side.
