= Dallmeyer =

Dallmeyer may refer to:

== People ==
People with the surname Dallmeyer include:

- Harm Dallmeyer (1943–1983), German politician
- William Q. Dallmeyer (1829–1908), German-born Missouri politician
- John Henry Dallmeyer (1830–1883), Anglo-German optician
  - His son Thomas Rudolphus Dallmeyer (1859–1906), English optician
  - J H Dallmeyer Ltd, the lens manufacturing business that they founded
- Andrew Dallmeyer (1945–2017), Scottish playwright, theatre director and actor

== Places ==
- Dallmeyer Peak, a peak in Argentinian Antarctica
