= JMDC =

JMDC may refer to:

- Japan Machine Design Center, a regulatory organization of the early Japanese optical industry
- Jinnah Medical and Dental College in Karachi, Sindh, Pakistan
- Joint Manual Direction Center, a planned, but not implemented, air defense system at the Fort Heath radar station in Winthrop, Massachusetts
- Jurupa Mountains Discovery Center, a natural history museum in Jurupa Valley, California
