= Graham W. Jackson Sr. =

American musician

Graham Washington Jackson Sr. (February 22, 1903 – January 15, 1983) was an American theatre organist, pianist, accordionist, and choral conductor. He was the subject of a Life magazine photograph taken at the departure of Franklin D. Roosevelt's funeral train.

== Early life and education ==
Of African American heritage, Jackson was born in Portsmouth, Virginia in 1903. He exhibited an early ability to master multiple instruments and was giving piano and organ concerts at high school age. A wealthy patron was to fund his further study at the college level, but when the patron died, Jackson continued his musical endeavors without further formal training until he moved to Georgia.

== Atlanta career ==
His performing and touring led him to Atlanta, where he was featured at the Royal Theatre and at Bailey's "81" which featured a Kimball theatre organ.

Count Basie, in his autobiography said of Jackson:

There was also another fine musician working in Bailey's 81 in Atlanta. We played there a couple of times at least...I was backstage before time to go on, and I heard the organ and it was just beautiful. I asked who was out there playing all that great stuff, and somebody said it was a cat named Graham Jackson. And I said, "Hell, I know that cat from Asbury Park, but he wasn't playing no organ then...After Asbury Park he had come back south by himself, and during that time he studied the organ and mastered it, and I think they put that big one in Bailey's 81 especially for him. He owned that town when it came to playing some organ...

During his early days in Atlanta, Jackson attended Morehouse College and later Chicago Music College, Hampton Institute, Loyola University, and Atlanta University. In 1928, he joined the faculty at Washington High School in Atlanta and served as its music director until 1940.

== World War II and association with Franklin Roosevelt ==
Jackson became a personal friend of Eleanor and President Franklin D. Roosevelt, and had played command performances in Washington numerous times. He was present in Warm Springs, Georgia, when Franklin Roosevelt died on April 12, 1945. The two had been collaborating at the Little White House on a version of Dvořák's "Goin' Home" the day before.

Ed Clark, a Life magazine photographer, took a photo of a tearful Jackson, accordion in hand, playing "Goin' Home" as Roosevelt's funeral train left Warm Springs. He later recalled, "The photographer stumbled over my foot and looked up. He saw my face and saw those tears coming down my cheek, and he just reached around on his shoulder and got one of his cameras and - blip - and thought no more of it."

Jackson served in the Navy from 1942 to 1945. Eventually he received six honorary citations for his war bond fundraising, which helped yield more than $3,000,000 in sales, and recruiting for the Navy.

== Musical career ==
As his musical fame increased, Jackson became known as "The Ambassador of Good Will". He was named Official Musician of the State of Georgia by Governor Jimmy Carter on November 30, 1971. He appeared on Ed Sullivan's Toast of the Town and Dave Garroway's Today Show, and also formed the Graham Jackson Choir which toured extensively and recorded an album for Westminster Records (WP 6048: Spirituals: Graham Jackson Choir). He appeared with numerous entertainment personalities, including Vladimir Horowitz, Joseph Szigeti, and Deems Taylor. Jackson often made guest appearances at the mammoth 4-manual M.P. Möller organ in Atlanta's Fox Theatre and also recorded a second album for Westminster Records of solo theatre organ played on the Byrd Theatre's Wurlitzer in Richmond, Virginia. (WP 6084: Solid Jackson). In later years, Jackson entertained with a combo and as a solo Hammond artist at Atlanta's Johnny Reb's Restaurant and Pittypat's Porch, where he often featured his own musical compilation, The Battle of Atlanta. Jackson's musical career—especially as a theatre organist—is linked to a rather small and select company of other African American musicians who practiced that specialized art such as Bob Wyatt, Fats Waller, and Jimmy Paulin. In 1985, he was inducted posthumously into the Georgia Music Hall of Fame.

In 1960, Life magazine published an article on Jackson's musical career.

== Personal life ==
Jackson was married to Helen Balton and had two sons, Graham W. Jackson Jr., born October 25, 1954, and Gerald Wayne Jackson, born March 13, 1958. He built a home in Atlanta which was modelled on Roosevelt's Little White House in Warm Springs.

He died at the age of 79 after suffering a stroke.

== The Jackson Collection at the Atlanta Public Library ==
The Atlanta Public Library has a large collection of papers, photos, recording, sheet music, and instruments from Jackson's estate. A complete inventory is available online.
