= Rapid Rectilinear =

Photographic lens design

- Introduced in: 1866
- Author: John Henry Dallmeyer
- Construction: 4 elements in 2 groups
- Aperture: f/6 (original) f/3.5 (portrait Aplanat)

The Rapid Rectilinear also named Aplanat is a famous photographic lens design.

The Rapid Rectilinear is a lens that is symmetrical about its aperture stop with four elements in two groups. It was introduced by John Henry Dallmeyer in 1866. The symmetry of the design greatly reduces radial distortion, improving on the Petzval lens.

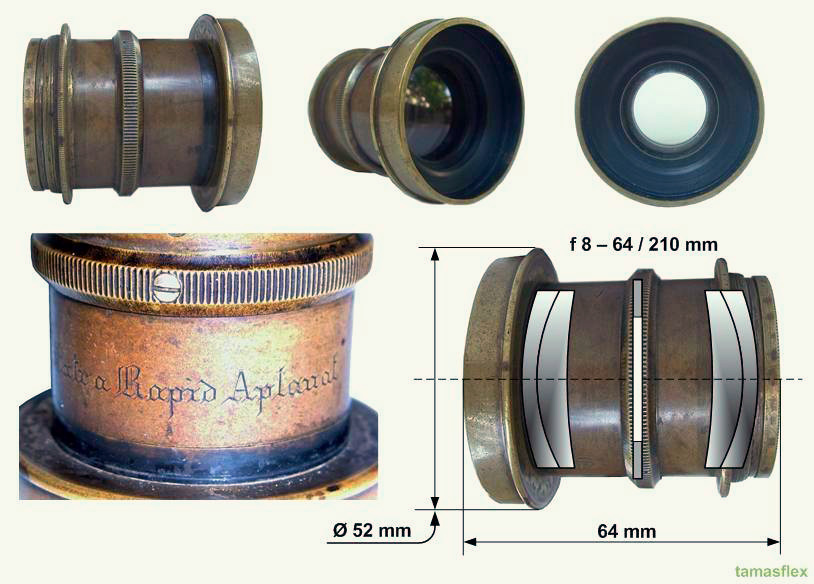
Aplanat photographic lens.

== See also ==
- Rectilinear lens
