= John Henry Dallmeyer =

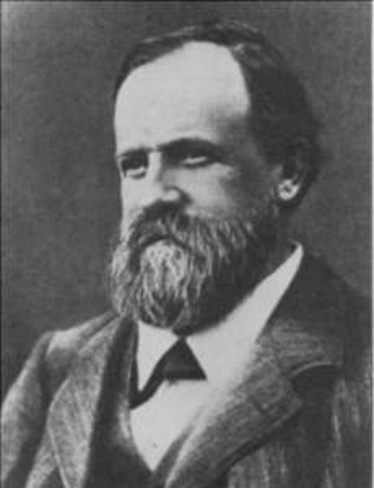
- John Henry Dallmeyer
- Born: 6 September 1830; Loxten, Westphalia
- Died: 30 December 1883 (aged 53)
- Occupation: optician
- Children: Thomas Rudolphus Dallmeyer

John Henry Dallmeyer (6 September 1830 – 30 December 1883), Anglo-German optician, was born at Loxten, Westphalia, the son of a landowner.

On leaving school at the age of sixteen he was apprenticed to an Osnabrück optician, and in 1851 he came to London, where he obtained work with an optician, W Hewitt, who shortly afterwards, with his workmen, entered the employment of Andrew Ross, a lens and telescope manufacturer.

Dallmeyer's position in this workshop appears to have been an unpleasant one, and led him to take, for a time, employment as French and German correspondent for a commercial firm. After a year he was, however, re-engaged by Ross as scientific adviser, and was entrusted with the testing and finishing of the highest class of optical apparatus. This appointment led to his marriage with Ross's second daughter, Hannah, and to the inheritance, at Ross's death (1859), of a third of his employer's large fortune and the telescope manufacturing portion of the business.

Turning from astronomical work to the design and making of photographic lenses, he introduced improvements in both portrait and landscape lenses, in object-glasses for the microscope and in condensers for the optical lantern. An important invention was the Rapid Rectilinear camera objective. In connection with celestial photography he constructed photo-heliographs for the Wilna observatory in 1863, for the Harvard College Observatory in 1864, and, in 1873, several for the British government.

Dallmeyer's instruments achieved a wide success in Europe and America, taking the highest awards at various international exhibitions. The Russian government gave him the order of St Stanislaus, and the French government made him chevalier of the Legion of Honour.

He was for many years upon the councils of both the Royal Astronomical Society and Royal Photographic Society. About 1880 he was advised to give up the personal supervision of his workshops, and to travel for his health, but he died on board ship, off the coast of New Zealand, on 30 December 1883.

His second son, Thomas Rudolphus Dallmeyer assumed control of the business on the failure of his father's health.
