= Photographic lens design =

Design of lenses for use in cameras

The design of photographic lenses for use in still or cine cameras is intended to produce a lens that yields the most acceptable rendition of the subject being photographed within a range of constraints that include cost, weight and materials. For many other optical devices such as telescopes, microscopes and theodolites where the visual image is observed but often not recorded the design can often be significantly simpler than is the case in a camera where every image is captured on film or image sensor and can be subject to detailed scrutiny at a later stage. Photographic lenses also include those used in enlargers and projectors.

== Design ==
=== Design requirements ===
From the perspective of the photographer, the ability of a lens to capture sufficient light so that the camera can operate over a wide range of lighting conditions is important. Designing a lens that reproduces colour accurately is also important as is the production of an evenly lit and sharp image over the whole of the film or sensor plane.

For the lens designer, achieving these objectives will also involve ensuring that internal flare, optical aberrations and weight are all reduced to the minimum whilst zoom, focus and aperture functions all operate smoothly and predictably.

However, because photographic films and electronic sensors have a finite and measurable resolution, photographic lenses are not always designed for maximum possible resolution since the recording medium would not be able to record the level of detail that the lens could resolve. For this, and many other reasons, camera lenses are unsuitable for use as projector or enlarger lenses.

The design of a fixed focal length lens (also known as prime lenses) presents fewer challenges than the design of a zoom lens. A high-quality prime lens whose focal length is about equal to the diameter of the film frame or sensor may be constructed from as few as four separate lens elements, often as pairs on either side of the aperture diaphragm. Good examples include the Zeiss Tessar or the Leitz Elmar.

==== Design constraints ====
To be useful in photography any lens must be able to fit the camera for which it is intended and this will physically limit the size where the bayonet mounting or screw mounting is to be located.

Photography is a highly competitive commercial business and both weight and cost constrain the production of lenses.

Refractive materials such as glass have physical limitations which limit the performance of lenses. In particular the range of refractive indices available in commercial glasses span a very narrow range. Since it is the refractive index that determines how much the rays of light are bent at each interface and since it is the differences in refractive indices in paired plus and minus lenses that constrains the ability to minimise chromatic aberrations, having only a narrow spectrum of indices is a major design constraint.

=== Lens elements ===
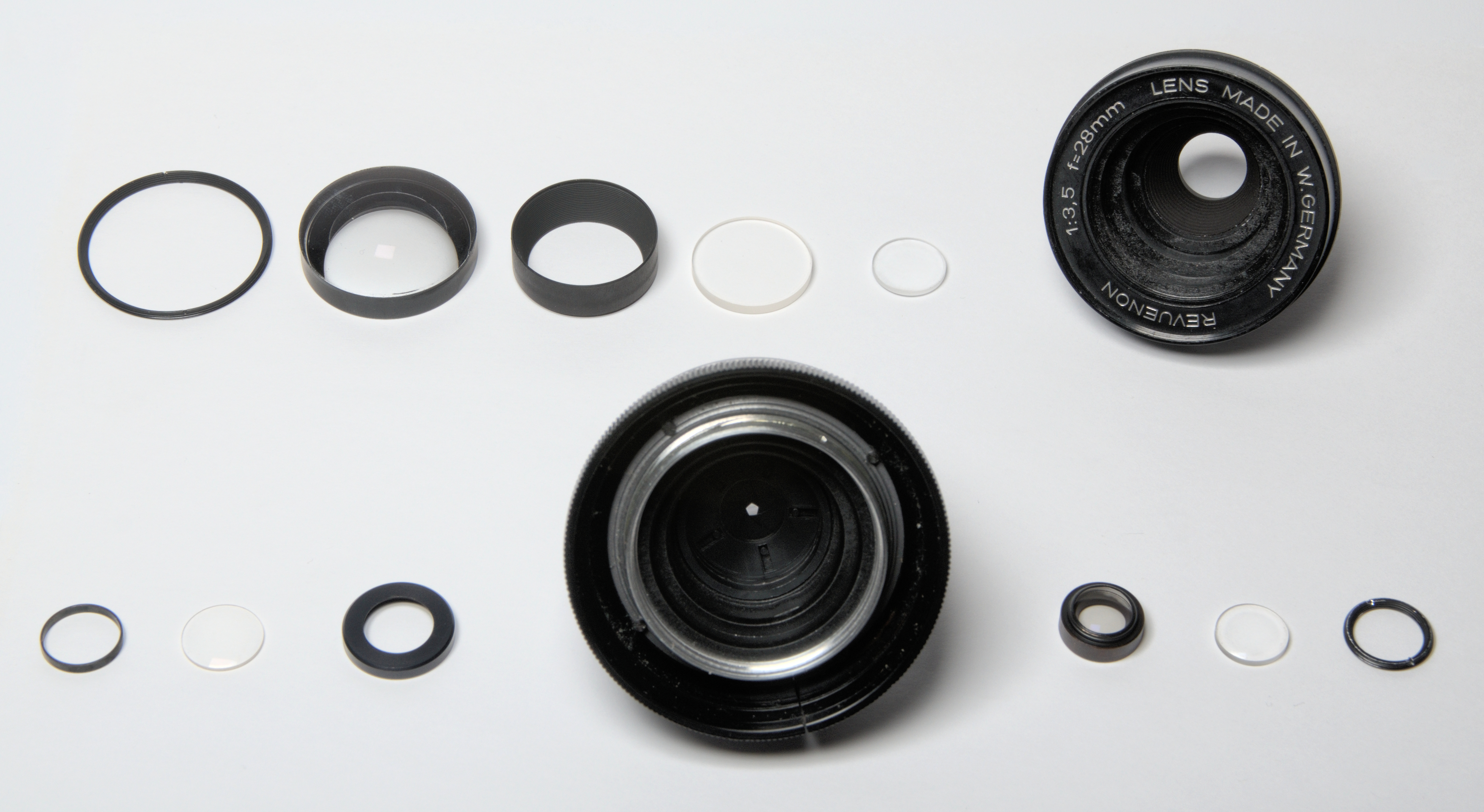
Elements of an inexpensive 28mm lens

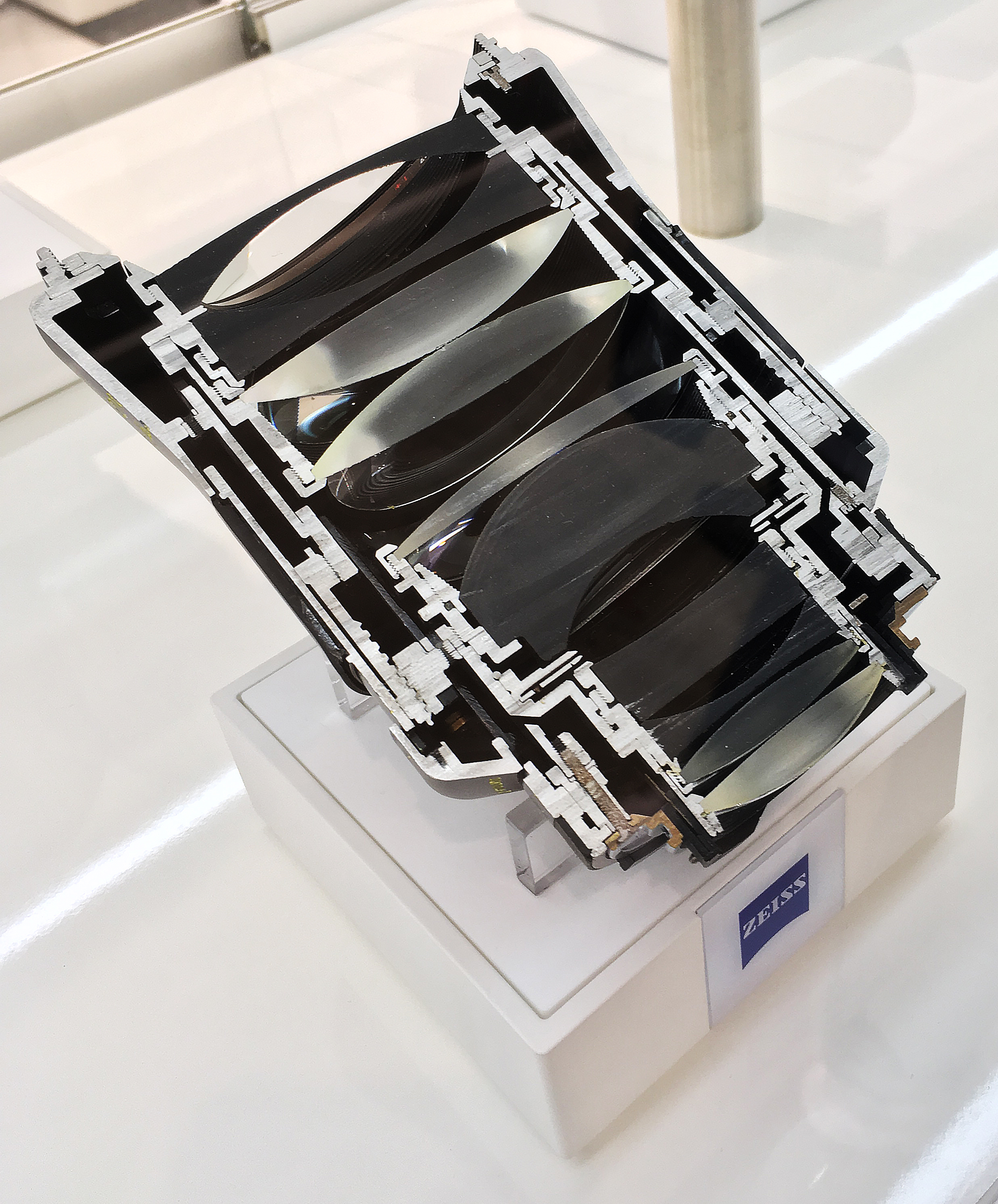
Photographic lens cut for demonstration

Except for the most simple and inexpensive lenses, each complete lens is made up from a number of separate lens elements arranged along a common axis. The use of many lens elements serves to minimise aberrations and to provide a sharp image free from visible distortions. To do this requires lens elements of different compositions and different shapes. To minimise chromatic aberrations, e.g., in which different wavelengths of light are refracted to different degrees, requires, at a minimum, a doublet of lens elements with a positive element having a high Abbe number matched with a negative element of lower Abbe number. With this design one can achieve a good degree of convergence of different wavelengths in the visible spectrum. Most lens designs do not attempt to bring infrared wavelengths to the same common focus and it is therefore necessary to manually alter the focus when photographing in infrared light. Other kinds of aberrations such as coma or astigmatism can also be minimized by careful choice of curvature of the lens faces for all the component elements. Complex photographic lenses can consist of more than 15 lens elements.

Most lens elements are made with curved surfaces with a spherical profile. That is, the curved shape would fit on the surface of a sphere. This is partly to do with the history of lens making but also because grinding and manufacturing of spherical surface lenses is relatively simple and cheap. However, spherical surfaces also give rise to lens aberrations and can lead to complicated lens designs of great size. Higher-quality lenses with fewer elements and lower size can be achieved by using aspheric lenses in which the curved surfaces are not spherical, giving more degrees of freedom to correct aberrations.

==== Lens glass ====
The majority of photographic lenses have the lens elements made from glass although the use of high-quality plastics is becoming more common in high-quality lenses and has been common in inexpensive cameras for some time. The design of photographic lenses is very demanding as designers push the limits of existing materials to make more versatile, better-quality, and lighter lenses. As a consequence, many exotic glasses have been used in modern lens manufacturing. Caesium and lanthanum glass lenses are now in use because of their high refractive index and very low dispersion properties. It is also likely that a number of other transition element glasses are in use but manufacturers often prefer to keep their material specification secret to retain a commercial or performance edge over competitors.

=== Focus ===
Until recent years, focusing of a camera lens to achieve a sharp image on the film plane was achieved by means of a very shallow helical thread in the lens mount through which the lens could be rotated, moving it closer or further from the film plane. This arrangement, while simple to design and construct, has some limitations, not least the rotation of the greater part of the lens assembly including the front element. This could be problematic if devices such as polarising filters are used that require accurate rotational orientation irrespective of focus distance. Mechanisms which move the entire lens assembly without rotating it are a feature found in professional grade lenses.

Later developments adopted designs in which internal elements were moved to achieve focus without affecting the outer barrel of the lens or the orientation of the front element.

Many modern cameras now use automatic focusing mechanisms which use ultrasonic motors to move internal elements in the lens to achieve optimum focus.

=== Aperture control ===
The aperture control, usually a multi-leaf diaphragm, is critical to the performance of a lens. The role of the aperture is to control the amount of light passing through the lens to the film or sensor plane. An aperture placed outside of the lens, as in the case of some Victorian cameras, risks vignetting of the image in which the corners of the image are darker than the centre. A diaphragm too close to the image plane risks the diaphragm itself being recorded as a circular shape or at the very least causing diffraction patterns at small apertures. In most lens designs the aperture is positioned about midway between the front surface of the objective and the image plane. In some zoom lenses it is placed some distance away from the ideal location in order to accommodate the movement of floating lens elements needed to perform the zoom function.

Most modern lenses for 35mm format rarely provide a stop smaller than f/22 because of the diffraction effects caused by light passing through a very small aperture. As diffraction is based on aperture width in absolute terms rather than the f-stop ratio, lenses for very small formats common in compact cameras rarely go above f/11 (1/1.8") or f/8 (1/2.5"), while lenses for medium- and large-format provide f/64 or f/128.

Very-large-aperture lenses designed to be useful in very low light conditions with apertures ranging from f/1.2 to f/0.9 are generally restricted to lenses of standard focal length because of the size and weight problems that would be encountered in telephoto lenses and the difficulty of building a very wide aperture wide angle lens with the refractive materials currently available. Very-large-aperture lenses are commonly made for other types of optical instruments such as microscopes but in such cases the diameter of the lens is very small and weight is not an issue.

Many very early cameras had diaphragms external to the lens often consisting of a rotating circular plate with a number of holes of increasing size drilled through the plate. Rotating the plate would bring an appropriate sized hole in front of the lens. All modern lenses use a multi-leaf diaphragm so that at the central intersection of the leaves a more or less circular aperture is formed. Either a manual ring, or an electronic motor controls the angle of the diaphragm leaves and thus the size of the opening.

The placement of the diaphragm within the lens structure is constrained by the need to achieve even illumination over the whole film plane at all apertures and the requirement to not interfere with the movement of any movable lens element. Typically the diaphragm is situated at about the level of the optical centre of the lens.

=== Shutter mechanism ===
A shutter controls the length of time light is allowed to pass through the lens onto the film plane. For any given light intensity, the more sensitive the film or detector or the wider the aperture the shorter the exposure time need to be to maintain the optimal exposure. In the earliest cameras, exposures were controlled by moving a rotating plate from in front of the lens and then replacing it. Such a mechanism only works effectively for exposures of several seconds or more and carries a considerable risk of inducing camera shake. By the end of the 19th century spring tensioned shutter mechanisms were in use operated by a lever or by a cable release. Some simple shutters continued to be placed in front of the lens but most were incorporated within the lens mount itself. Such lenses with integral shutter mechanisms developed in the current Compur shutter as used in many non-reflex cameras such as Linhof. These shutters have a number of metal leaves that spring open and then close after a pre-determined interval. The material and design constraints limit the shortest speed to about 0.002 second. Although such shutters cannot yield as short an exposure time as focal-plane shutter they are able to offer flash synchronisation at all speeds.

Incorporating a commercial made Compur type shutter required lens designers to accommodate the width of the shutter mechanism in the lens mount and provide for the means of triggering the shutter on the lens barrel or transferring this to the camera body by a series of levers as in the Minolta twin-lens cameras.

The need to accommodate the shutter mechanism within the lens barrel limited the design of wide-angle lenses and it was not until the widespread use of focal-plane shutters that extreme wide-angle lenses were developed.

== Types of lenses ==
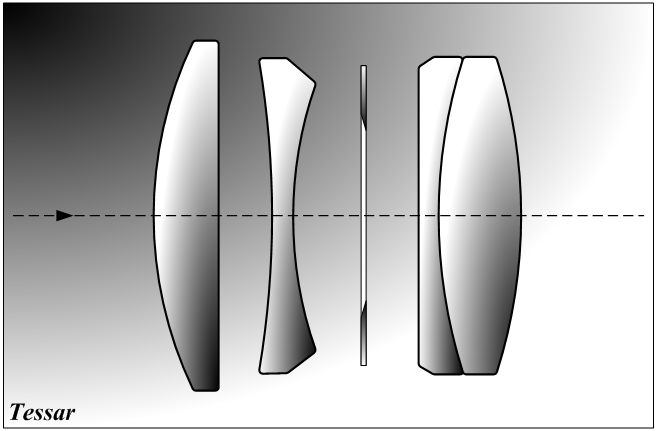
Example of a prime lens - Carl Zeiss Tessar.

The type of lens being designed is significant in setting the key parameters.

- Prime lens – a photographic lens whose focal length is fixed, as opposed to a zoom lens, or that is the primary lens in a combination lens system.
- Zoom lenses – variable focal length lenses. Zoom lenses cover a range of focal lengths by utilising movable elements within the barrel of the lens assembly. In early varifocal lens lenses, the focus also shifted as the lens focal length was changed. Varifocal lenses are also used in many modern autofocus cameras as the lenses are cheaper and simpler to construct and the autofocus can take care of the re-focussing requirements. Many modern zoom lenses are now confocal, meaning that the focus is maintained throughout the zoom range. Because of the need to operate over a range of focal lengths and maintain confocality, zoom lenses typically have very many lens elements. More significantly, the front elements of the lens will always be a compromise in terms of its size, light-gathering capability and the angle of incidence of the incoming rays of light. For all these reasons, the optical performance of zoom lenses tends to be lower than fixed-focal-length lenses.
- Normal lens – a lens with a focal length about equal to the diagonal size of the film or sensor format, or that reproduces perspective that generally looks "normal" to a human observer.

Cross-section of a typical short-focus wide-angle lens.

- Wide angle lens – a lens that reproduces perspective that generally looks "wider" than a normal lens. The problem posed by the design of wide-angle lenses is to bring to an accurate focus light from a wide area without causing internal flare. Wide-angle lenses therefore tend to have more elements than a normal lens to help refract the light sufficiently and still minimise aberrations whilst adding light-trapping baffles between each lens element.

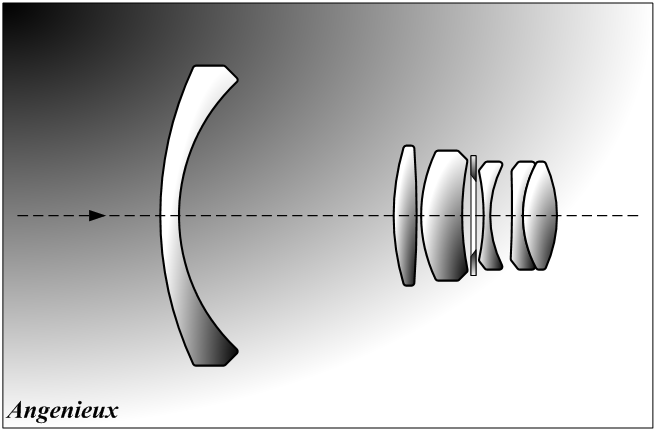
Cross-section of a typical retrofocus wide-angle lens.

- Extreme or ultra-wide-angle lens – a wide-angle lens with an angle of view above 90 degrees. Extreme-wide-angle lenses share the same issues as ordinary wide-angle lenses but the focal length of such lenses may be so short that there is insufficient physical space in front of the film or sensor plane to construct a lens. This problem is resolved by constructing the lens as an inverted telephoto, or retrofocus with the front element having a very short focal length, often with a highly exaggerated convex front surface and behind it a strongly negative lens grouping that extends the cone of focused rays so that they can be brought to focus at a reasonable distance.

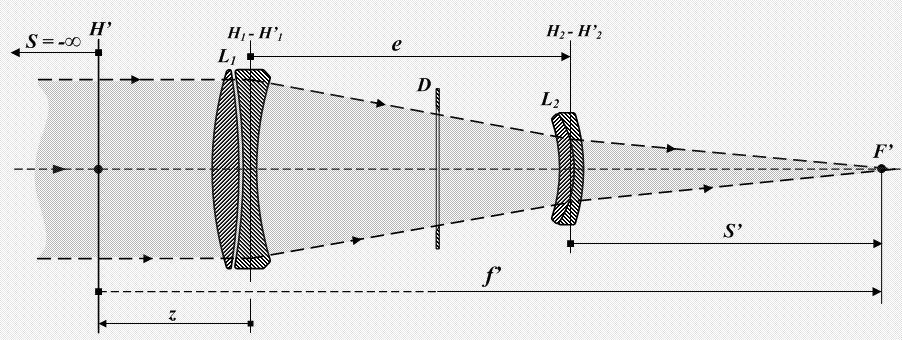
Cross-section - typical telephoto lens. L1 - Tele positive lens group L2 - Tele negative lens group D - Diaphragm

- Fisheye lens – an extreme wide-angle lens with a strongly convex front element. Spherical aberration is usually pronounced and sometimes enhanced for special effect. Optically designed as a reverse telephoto to enable the lens to fit into a standard mount as the focal length can be less than the distance from lens mount to focal plane.
- Long-focus lens – a lens with a focal length greater than the diagonal of the film frame or sensor. Long focus lenses are relatively simple to design, the challenges being comparable to the design of a prime lens. However, as the focal length increases the length of the lens and the size of the objective increase in size and length and weight quickly become significant design issues in retaining utility and practicality for the lens in use. In addition because the light path through the lens is long and glancing, baffles to control flare become more important.
- Telephoto lens – an optically compressed version of the long-focus lens. The design of telephoto lenses reduces some of the problems encountered by designers of long-focus lenses. In particular, telephoto lenses are typically much shorter and may be lighter for equivalent focal length and aperture. However telephoto designs increase the number of lens elements and can introduce flare and exacerbate some optical aberrations.
- Catadioptric lens – catadioptric lenses are a form of telephoto lens but with a light path that doubles back on itself and with an objective that is a mirror combined with some form of aberration correcting lens (a catadioptric system) rather than just a lens. A centrally placed secondary mirror and usually an additional small lens group bring the light to focus. Such lenses are very lightweight and can easily deliver very long focal lengths but they can only deliver a fixed aperture and have none of the benefits of being able to stop down the aperture to increase depth of field.
- Anamorphic lenses are used principally in cinematography to produce wide-screen films where the projected image has a substantially different ratio of height to width than the image recorded on the film plane. This is achieved by the use of a specialised lens design which compresses the image laterally at the recording stage and the film is then projected through a similar lens in the cinema to recreate the wide-screen effect. Although in some cases the anamorphic effect is achieved by using an anamorphising attachment as a supplementary element on the front of a normal lens, most films shot in anamorphic formats use specially designed anamorphic lenses, such as the Hawk lenses made by Vantage Film or Panavision's anamorphic lenses. These lenses incorporate one or more aspheric elements in their design.
- Periscope lens – uses a prism or mirror to redirect the light through the lenses with a 90° angle to the optical axis, like the half of a periscope.

=== Enlarger lenses ===
Lenses used in photographic enlargers are required to focus light passing through a relatively small film area on a larger area of photographic paper or film. Requirements for such lenses include

- the ability to record even illumination over the whole field
- to record fine detail present in the film being enlarged
- to withstand frequent cycles of heating and cooling as the illumination lamp is turned on and off
- to be able to be operated in the dark – usually by means of click stops and some luminous controls

The design of the lens is required to work effectively with light passing from near focus to far focus – exactly the reverse of a camera lens. This demands that internal light baffling within the lens is designed differently and that the individual lens elements are designed to maximize performance for this change of direction of incident light.

=== Projector lenses ===
Projector lenses share many of the design constraints as enlarger lenses but with some critical differences. Projector lenses are always used at full aperture and must produce an acceptably illuminated and acceptably sharp image at full aperture.

However, because projected images are almost always viewed at some distance, lack of very fine focus and slight unevenness of illumination is often acceptable. Projector lenses have to be very tolerant of prolonged high temperatures from the projector lamp and frequently have a focal length much longer than the taking lens. This allows the lens to be positioned at a greater distance from the illuminated film and allows an acceptable sized image with the projector some distance from the screen. It also permits the lens to be mounted in a relatively coarsely threaded focusing mount so that the projectionist can quickly correct any focusing errors.

== History ==
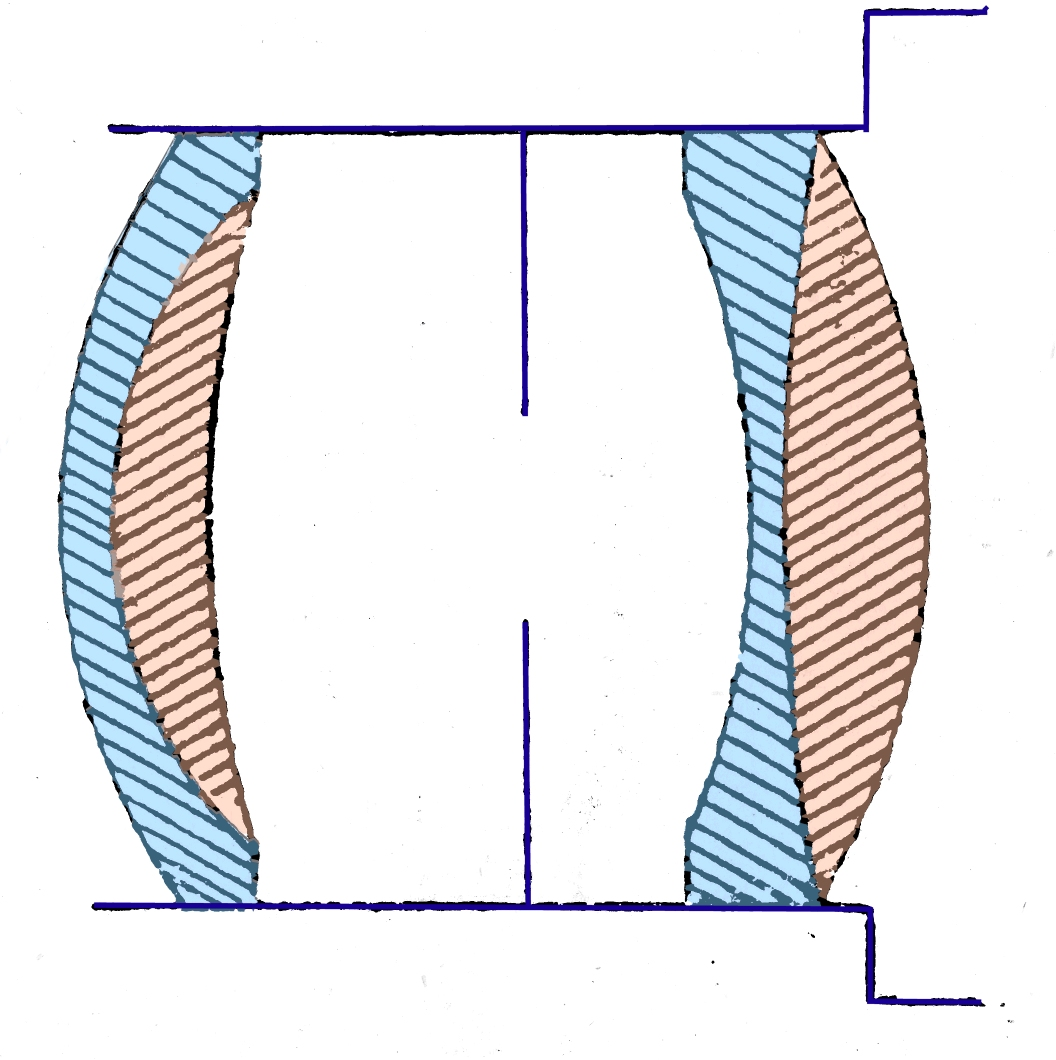
Diagram of Petzval's 1841 portrait lens - crown glass shaded pink, flint glass shaded blue

The lenses of the very earliest cameras were simple meniscus or simple bi convex lenses. It was not until 1840 that Chevalier in France introduced the achromatic lens formed by cementing a crown glass bi-convex lens to a flint glass plano-concave lens. By 1841 Voigtländer using the design of Joseph Petzval manufactured the first commercially successful two element lens.

Carl Zeiss was an entrepreneur who needed a competent designer to take his firm beyond just another optical workshop. In 1866, the service of Dr Ernst Abbe was enlisted. From then on novel products appeared in rapid succession which brought the Zeiss company to the forefront of optical technology.

Abbe was instrumental in the development of the famous Jena optical glass. When he was trying to eliminate astigmatism from microscopes, he realised that the range of optical glasses available was insufficient. After some calculations, he realised that performance of optical instruments would dramatically improve, if optical glasses of appropriate properties were available. His challenge to glass manufacturers was finally answered by Dr Otto Schott, who established the famous glassworks at Jena from which new types of optical glass began to appear from 1888, and employed by Zeiss and other makers.

The new Jena optical glass also opened up the possibility of increased performance of photographic lenses. The first use of Jena glass in a photographic lens was by Voigtländer, but as the lens was an old design its performance was not greatly improved. Subsequently, the new glasses would demonstrate their value in correcting astigmatism, and in the production of achromatic and apochromatic lenses. Abbé started the design of a photographic lens of symmetrical design with five elements, but went no further.

Zeiss' innovative photographic lens design was due to Dr Paul Rudolph. In 1890, Rudolph designed an asymmetrical lens with a cemented group at each side of the diaphragm, and appropriately named "Anastigmat". This lens was made in three series: Series III, IV and V, with maximum apertures of f/7.2, f/12.5, and f/18 respectively. In 1891, Series I, II and IIIa appeared with respective maximum apertures of f/4.5, f/6.3, and f/9 and in 1893 came Series IIa of f/8 maximum aperture. These lenses are now better known by the trademark "Protar" which was first used in 1900.

At the time, single combination lenses, which occupy one side of the diaphragm only, were still popular. Rudolph designed one with three cemented elements in 1893, with the option of fitting two of them together in a lens barrel as a compound lens, but it was found to be the same as the Dagor by C.P. Goerz, designed by Emil von Höegh. Rudolph then came up with a single combination with four cemented elements, which can be considered as having all the elements of the Protar stuck together in one piece. Marketed in 1894, it was called the Protarlinse Series VII, the most highly corrected single combination lens with maximum apertures between f/11 and f/12.5, depending on its focal length.

But the important thing about this Protarlinse is that two of these lens units can be mounted in the same lens barrel to form a compound lens of even greater performance and larger aperture, between f/6.3 and f/7.7. In this configuration it was called the Double Protar Series VIIa. An immense range of focal lengths can thus be obtained by the various combination of Protarlinse units.

Rudolph also investigated the Double-Gauss concept of a symmetrical design with thin positive menisci enclosing negative elements. The result was the Planar Series Ia of 1896, with maximum apertures up to f/3.5, one of the fastest lenses of its time. Whilst it was very sharp, it suffered from coma which limited its popularity. However, further developments of this configuration made it the design of choice for high-speed lenses of standard coverage.

Probably inspired by the Stigmatic lenses designed by Hugh Aldis for Dallmeyer of London, Rudolph designed a new asymmetrical lens with four thin elements, the Unar Series Ib, with apertures up to f/4.5. Due to its high speed it was used extensively on hand cameras.

The most important Zeiss lens by Rudolph was the Tessar, first sold in 1902 in its Series IIb f/6.3 form. It can be said as a combination of the front half of the Unar with the rear half of the Protar. This proved to be a most valuable and flexible design, with tremendous development potential. Its maximum aperture was increased to f/4.7 in 1917, and reached f/2.7 in 1930. It is probable that every lens manufacturer has produced lenses of the Tessar configuration.

Rudolph left Zeiss after the First World War, but many other competent designers such as Merté, Wandersleb, etc. kept the firm at the leading edge of photographic lens innovations. One of the most significant designer was the ex-Ernemann man Dr Ludwig Bertele, famed for his Ernostar high-speed lens.

With the advent of the Contax by Zeiss-Ikon, the first serious challenge to the Leica in the field of professional 35 mm cameras, both Zeiss-Ikon and Carl Zeiss decided to beat the Leica in every possible way. Bertele's Sonnar series of lenses designed for the Contax were the match in every respect for the Leica for at least two decades. Other lenses for the Contax included the Biotar, Biogon, Orthometar, and various Tessars and Triotars.

The last important Zeiss innovation before the Second World War was the technique of applying anti-reflective coating to lens surfaces invented by Olexander Smakula in 1935. A lens so treated was marked with a red "T", short for "Transparent". The technique of applying multiple layers of coating was also described in the original patent writings in 1935.

After the partitioning of Germany, a new Carl Zeiss optical company was established in Oberkochen, while the original Zeiss firm in Jena continued to operate. At first both firms produced very similar lines of products, and extensively cooperated in product-sharing, but they drifted apart as time progressed. Jena's new direction was to concentrate on developing lenses for the 35 mm single-lens reflex camera, and many achievements were made, especially in ultra-wide angle designs. In addition to that, Oberkochen also worked on designing lenses for large format cameras, interchangeable front element lenses such as for the 35 mm single-lens reflex Contaflex, and other types of cameras.

Since the beginning of Zeiss as a photographic lens manufacturer, it has had a licensing programme which allows other manufacturers to produce its lenses. Over the years its licensees included Voigtländer, Bausch & Lomb, Ross, Koristka, Krauss, Kodak. etc. In the 1970s, the western operation of Zeiss-Ikon got together with Yashica to produce the new Contax cameras, and many of the Zeiss lenses for this camera, among others, were produced by Yashica's optical arm, Tomioka. Yashica's owner Kyocera ended camera production in 2006. Yashica lenses were then made by Cosina, who also manufactured most of the new Zeiss designs for the new Zeiss Ikon coupled rangefinder camera. Another licensee active today is Sony who uses the Zeiss name on lenses on its video and digital still cameras.

== See also ==
- Camera lens
