= Ed Clark (photographer) =

US-american photographer

- Born: July 3, 1911; Nashville, Tennessee, U.S.
- Died: January 22, 2000 (aged 88); Sarasota, Florida, U.S.
- Known for: Photography

Ed Clark (July 3, 1911, Nashville, Tennessee – January 22, 2000, Sarasota, Florida) was a photographer who worked primarily for Life magazine. His best remembered work captured a weeping Graham W. Jackson Sr. playing his accordion as the body of the recently deceased President Franklin D. Roosevelt was being transported to Washington, DC.

== The Nashville Tennessean ==
Clark dropped out of Hume-Fogg High School after he told the editor of the Nashville Tennessean newspaper he was a photographer and got a job as an assistant. "I lied," he later admitted. He recalled that "Covering a parade once, I used too much flash powder and nearly blew myself off the roof". However, he learned quickly and was promoted to staff photographer, a position he held for 13 years.

== Life magazine ==
His work came to the notice of Life, which made him a stringer in 1936. A 1942 photograph of World War I hero Alvin York registering for "The Old Man's Draft" brought a job offer, but he turned it down; "I was raising two young boys, and New York didn't seem like the place to raise them," he later explained. However, he changed his mind, becoming a staff photographer in 1944, after Life allowed him to remain in Tennessee for a few years.

=== Graham Jackson photograph ===
When he received a telephone call informing him that President Franklin D. Roosevelt had died, he drove all night from his home in Nashville to Warm Springs, Georgia. As the President's body was being taken to the train station, Clark, alone among the swarm of photographers present, noticed United States Navy bandsman Graham W. Jackson Sr. playing "Goin' Home", one of Roosevelt's favorite tunes, on his accordion as tears ran down his face. Jackson later recalled, "The photographer stumbled over my foot and looked up. He saw my face and saw those tears coming down my cheek, and he just reached around on his shoulder and got one of his cameras and - blip - and thought no more of it." The iconic photograph was published full page in the April 17, 1945, issue of Life, capturing the nation's grief.

=== Post-war ===
In 1945, he was temporarily assigned to the Paris offices. At the Nuremberg Trials, Clark photographed Hermann Göring.

In 1948, a series of photographs documented the gross inequality in educational resources allocated to white versus black children in the West Memphis School District of Arkansas; a single teacher had 100 black students, crammed into a single classroom. The Life story led to the construction of a new building for them.

That same year, Clark was assigned to the Los Angeles bureau, where he became acquainted with Hollywood stars. He was the only photographer invited to the wedding reception of Humphrey Bogart and Lauren Bacall. Around 1950, a friend told him of a "hot tomato" who had just signed with Twentieth Century-Fox. He took a series of pictures of a then unknown Marilyn Monroe which were not published at the time; much later, they came to light during a search of Life's archives.

He was also in the good graces of presidents. He took a portrait of Dwight D. Eisenhower using a Mathew Brady camera. On Eisenhower's last day as President, Clark was the only photographer permitted in the Oval Office. Another memorable photo showed then Senator John F. Kennedy spending time with his baby daughter Caroline. The Kennedys were so pleased with the result that it hung in the Oval Office after he was elected, and Jackie Kennedy asked for 75 copies.

In 1955, Clark received an unexpected invitation from the Soviet Union. He became the first Western photographer allowed behind the Iron Curtain in 30 years. The same year, Edward Steichen included his work in MoMA's blockbuster, world-touring The Family of Man exhibition, seen by more than nine million people.

Due to budgetary cutbacks, Life let go a third of its photographic staff in 1963, Ed Clark among them. By then, his vision had become impaired due to a cataract.

== Later life ==
He became a building contractor in Bethesda, Maryland or Washington.

In 1982, a doctor removed his cataract and implanted a new lens, restoring his vision. With his eyesight restored, he took pictures for publications such as the Washingtonian and the Ladies Home Journal.

In 1990, he was awarded the Photographic Society of America's Understanding Through Photography Award.

He took some courses on modern methods of black-and-white and color printing at Nashville State Tech. He later donated his collection to that institution.

Ed Clark and his wife Joyce moved to Sarasota, Florida. He died there on January 22, 2000, at the age of 88. His first wife, Garnet, predeceased him. He was survived by Joyce, his son Tom (from his first marriage), two grandchildren and three great-grandchildren.
