= Thomas Rudolphus Dallmeyer =

English optician

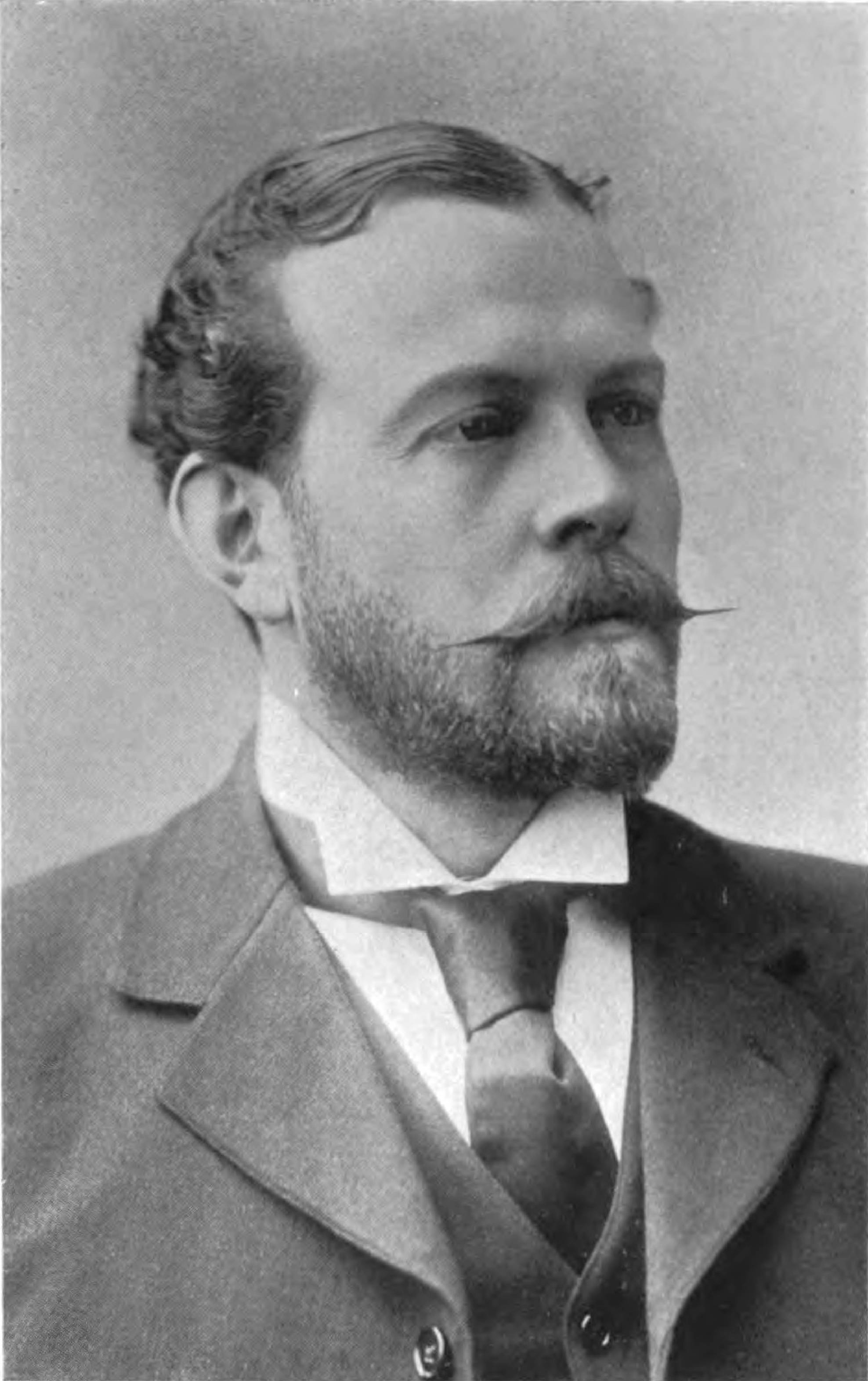
- Born: 16 May 1859
- Died: 25 December 1906 (aged 47)
- Education: Mill Hill School
- Occupation: optics

Thomas Rudolphus Dallmeyer (16 May 1859 – 25 December 1906), English optician, was the son of John Henry Dallmeyer who ran an optics business. His maternal grandfather, Andrew Ross, was himself the first English photographic optician.

== Life ==
After attending other schools, Thomas enrolled at Mill Hill School where he came under the tutelage of Dr. J.A.H. Murray who is best known as an editor of the Oxford English Dictionary. After leaving school, he entered his father's optometry business, while learning the theoretical side from Oliver Lodge.

When Thomas was twenty-one, his father went on a long voyage to recuperate from overwork but died during the journey. Thomas took over and not only maintained the reputation of the lenses his father had designed but he continually improved them and added new patterns. Among his principal inventions was the first practical telephoto lens (patented 1891) which he afterwards elaborated into many special forms for various purposes, a rapid landscape lens, a rectilinear landscape lens, some of the earliest rapid lenses made with lenses from Jena, Germany, and the Adon and Junior Adon telephoto lenses. He also invented the Naturalist's Camera for which he received the medal of the Royal Photographic Society. He also designed the Dallmeyer-Bergen lens, (Note: "The Dallmeyer-Bergen portrait lens is a simple telephoto composed of a single uncorrected lens, and the softness of definition is regulated by the diaphragm which is in front of all the glasses. It gives beautiful soft-focus effects without having to move the camera." — American Photography, Vol. 15, (1921) p.558) which was the prototype of the anachromatic lenses. It was suggested by a painter, J.S. Bergheim, who wished for a lens which would give him correct drawing and soft definition without sacrificing the natural structure of the original.

He was the author of a standard book on the subject of telephoto lenses, Telephotography (1899). He served as president of the Royal Photographic Society in 1900-1903.

He married Julia Fanny Thomas (died 26 September 1936), daughter of Charles Thomas Lt 54 Bengal Infantry, on 13 January 1886.
