= Nikon Nikkor Z MC 105 mm f/2.8 VR S =

Nikkor Z MC 105 mm f/2.8 VR S
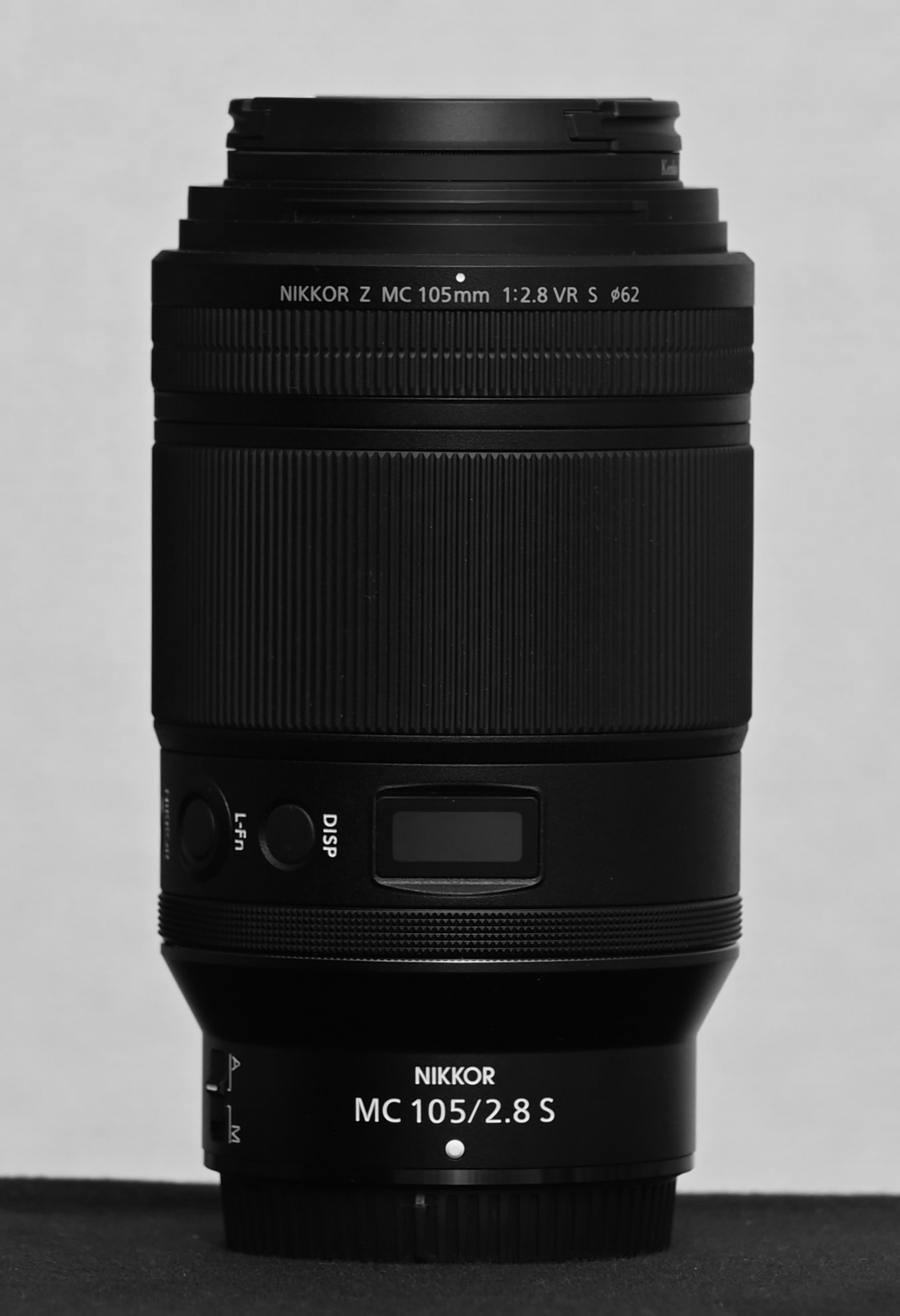
- Nikkor Z MC 105 mm f/2.8 VR S with a filter and lens cap attached
- Maker: Nikon
- Lens mount: Z-mount

Technical data
- Type: Prime
- Focus drive: Stepping motor
- Focal length: 105mm
- Image format: FX (full frame)
- Aperture (max/min): f/2.8–32
- Close focus distance: 0.29m
- Max. magnification: 1:1
- Diaphragm blades: 9 (rounded)
- Construction: 16 elements in 11 groups

Features
- Lens-based stabilization: Yes Yes
- Macro capable: Yes Yes
- Unique features: S-Line lens Nano Crystal Coat and ARNEO Coat elements Fluorine Coat; OLED screen
- Application: Macro

Physical
- Max. length: 140 mm
- Diameter: 85 mm
- Weight: 630 g
- Filter diameter: 62 mm

Software
- Latest firmware: 1.10 (as of 2 August 2022)
- User flashable: Yes Yes
- Lens ID: 24

Accessories
- Lens hood: HB-99 (bayonet)
- Case: CL-C2

Angle of view
- Diagonal: 23°10' (FX); 15°20' (DX)

History
- Introduction: June 2021
- Predecessor: AF-S VR 105mm f/2.8G IF-ED (F-mount)

Retail info
- MSRP: 999.95 USD (as of 2021)

The Nikon Nikkor Z MC 105 mm f/2.8 VR S is a full-frame macro prime lens manufactured by Nikon for use on Nikon Z-mount mirrorless cameras. It is part of Nikon's Micro-Nikkor line of lenses, and a successor of the F-mount AF-S VR 105mm f/2.8G IF-ED.

== Introduction ==
This lens was introduced on June 2, 2021, alongside the Nikkor Z MC 50 mm f/2.8, as the first macro lenses for Z-mount capable of 1:1 image reproduction. The lens comes with a bayonet lens hood (HB-99).

== Features ==
- 105 mm focal length (approximately equivalent field of view of a 157.5 mm lens when used on a DX format camera)
- S-Line lens
- 1:1 image reproduction ratio
- Autofocus using a stepping motor (STM), dedicated focus-by-wire manual focus ring
- 16 elements in 11 groups (including 3 ED glass and 1 aspherical lens elements, elements with Nano Crystal and ARNEO Coat, a fluorine-coated front lens element)
- 9-blade rounded diaphragm
- 4.5-stop Vibration Reduction (VR) optical stabilization
- Internal focusing (IF lens)
- Multi-function OLED display ("lens information panel"), capable of showing reproduction ratio, aperture, focus distance and depth of field information
- One customizable control ring at the back (aperture, ISO and exposure compensation functions can be assigned to it)
- One L-Fn customizable function button
- A/M switch for autofocus/manual focus modes
- Focus limiter switch (full, 0.5-0.29 m)
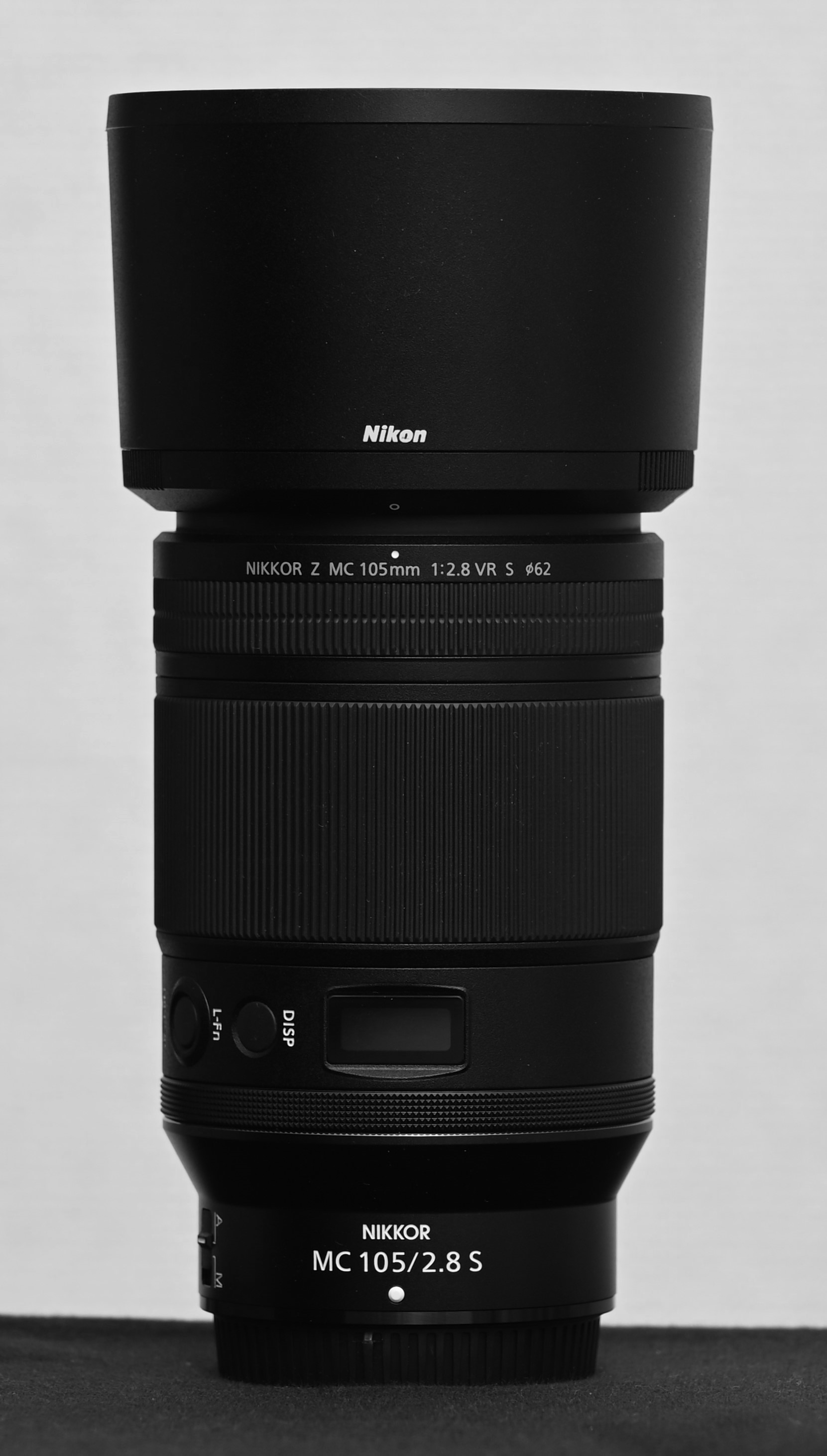
With lens hood attached (HB-99)

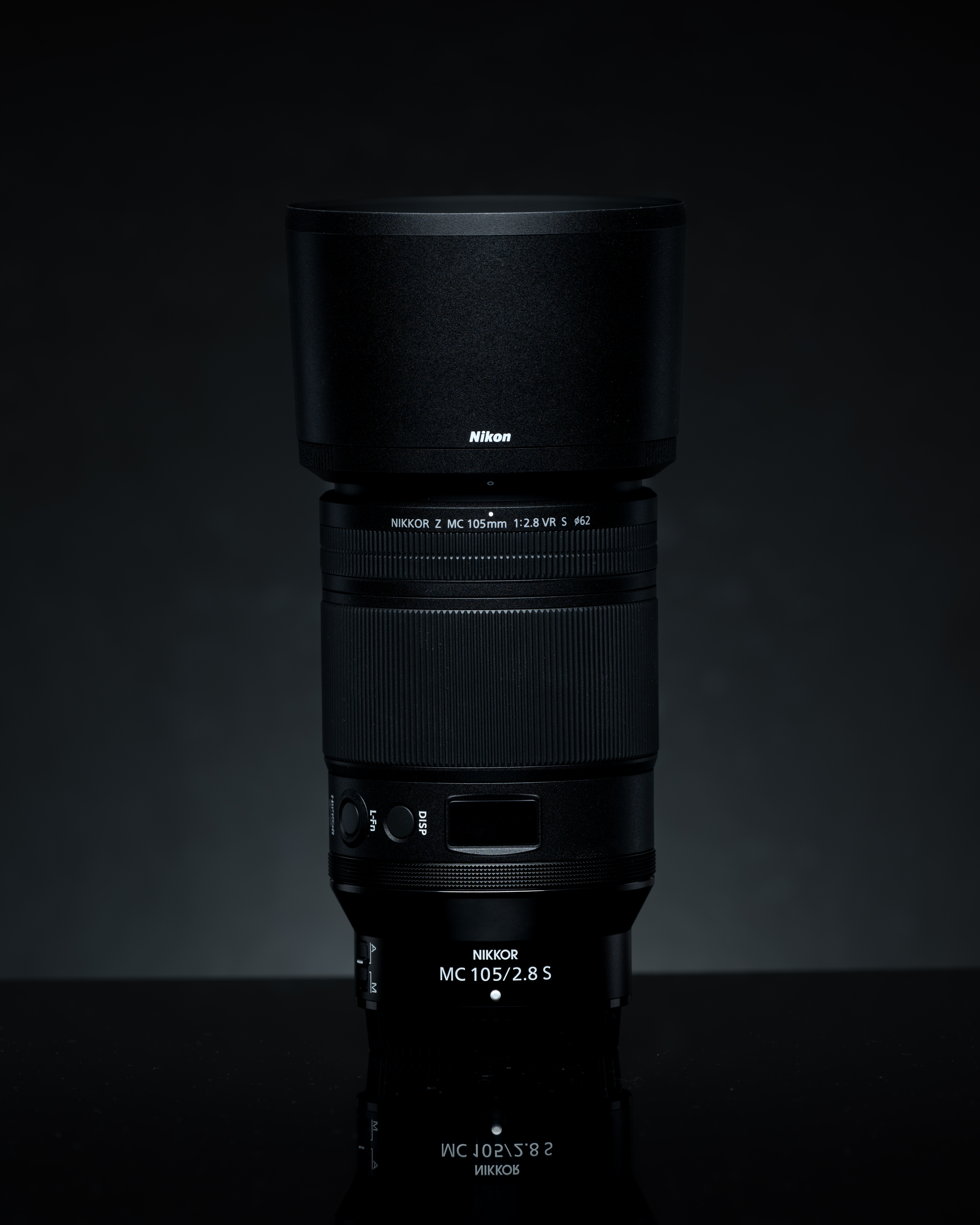

== Sample images ==
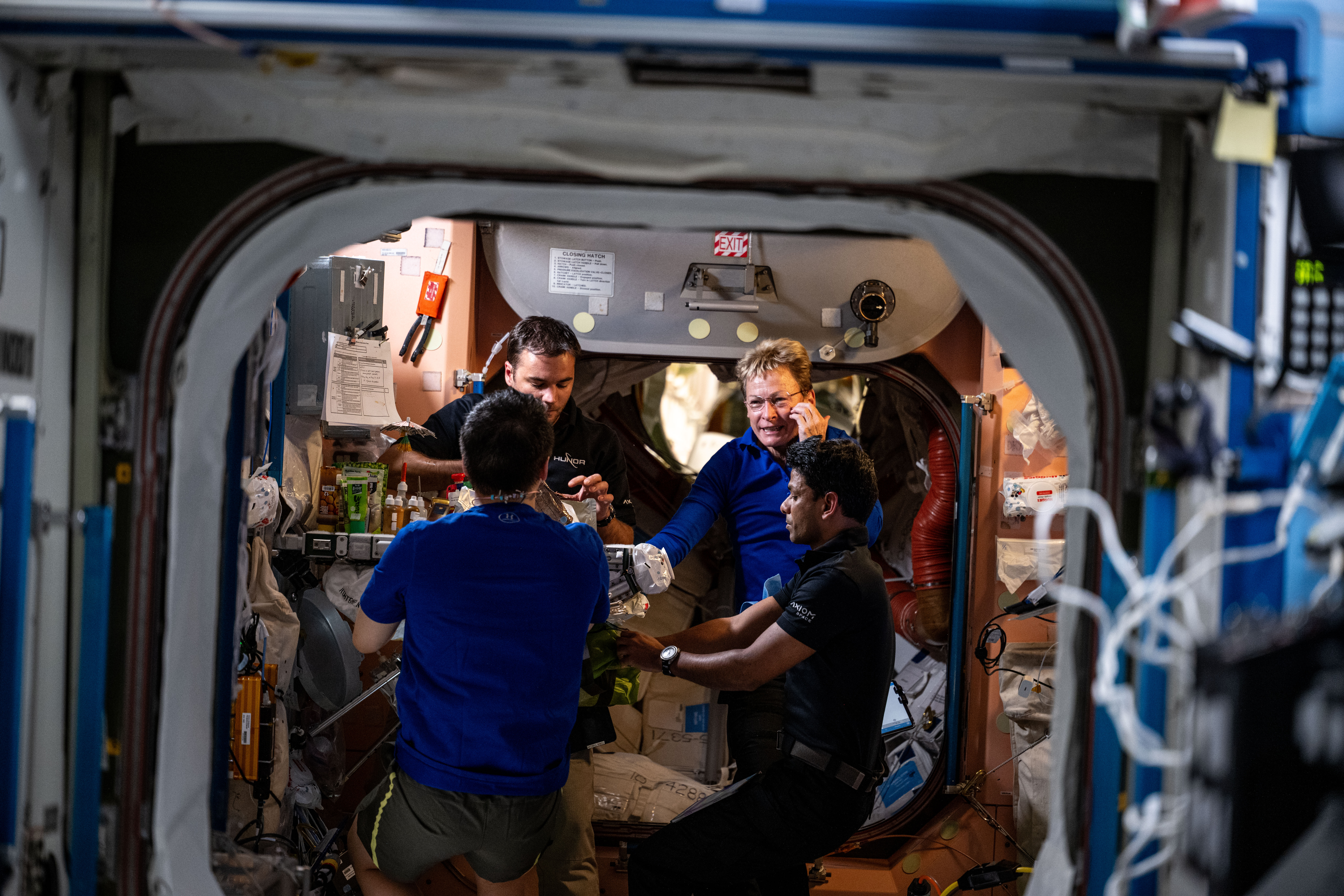
At f/2.8

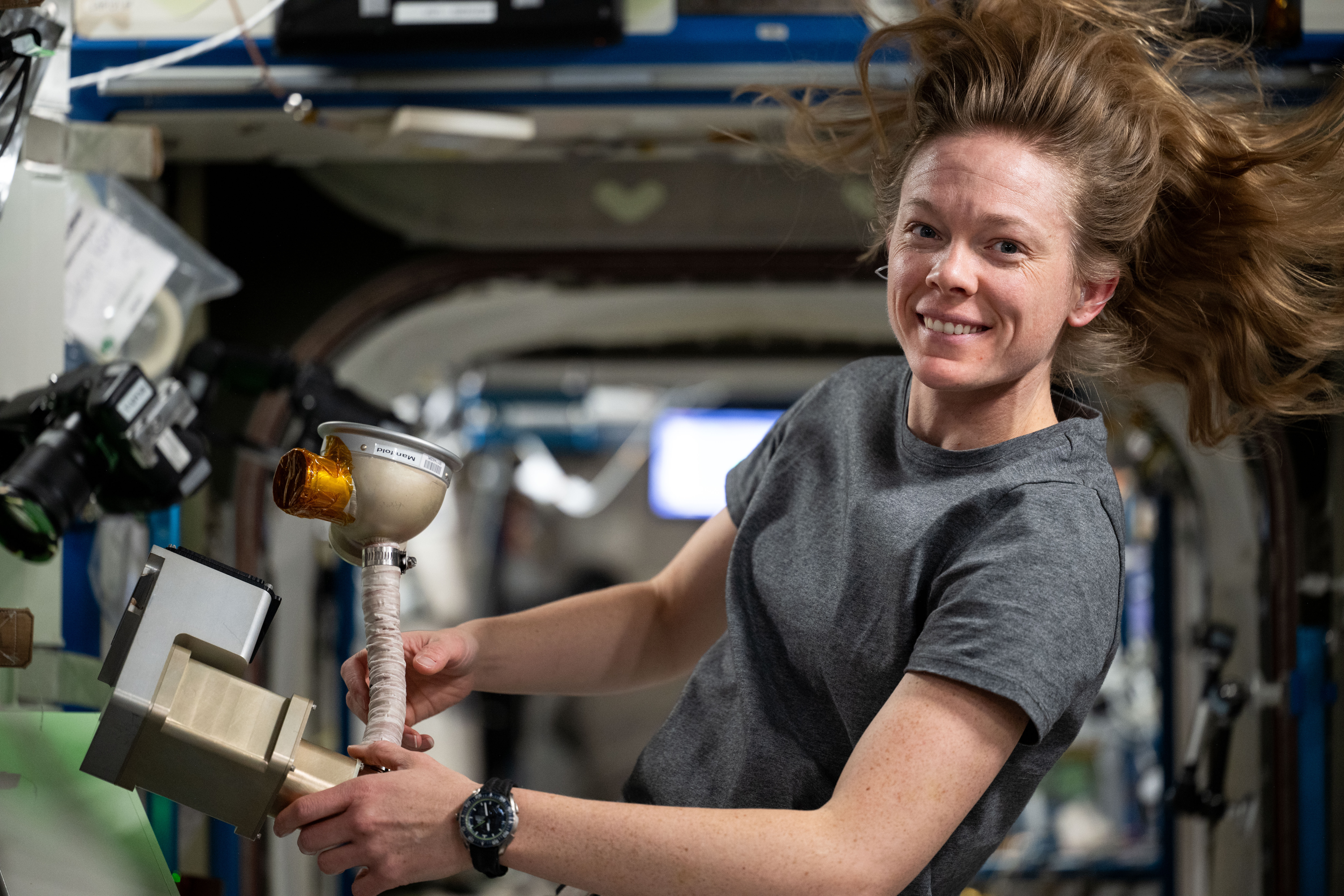
At f/2.8

At f/3.8 (focus stacked)

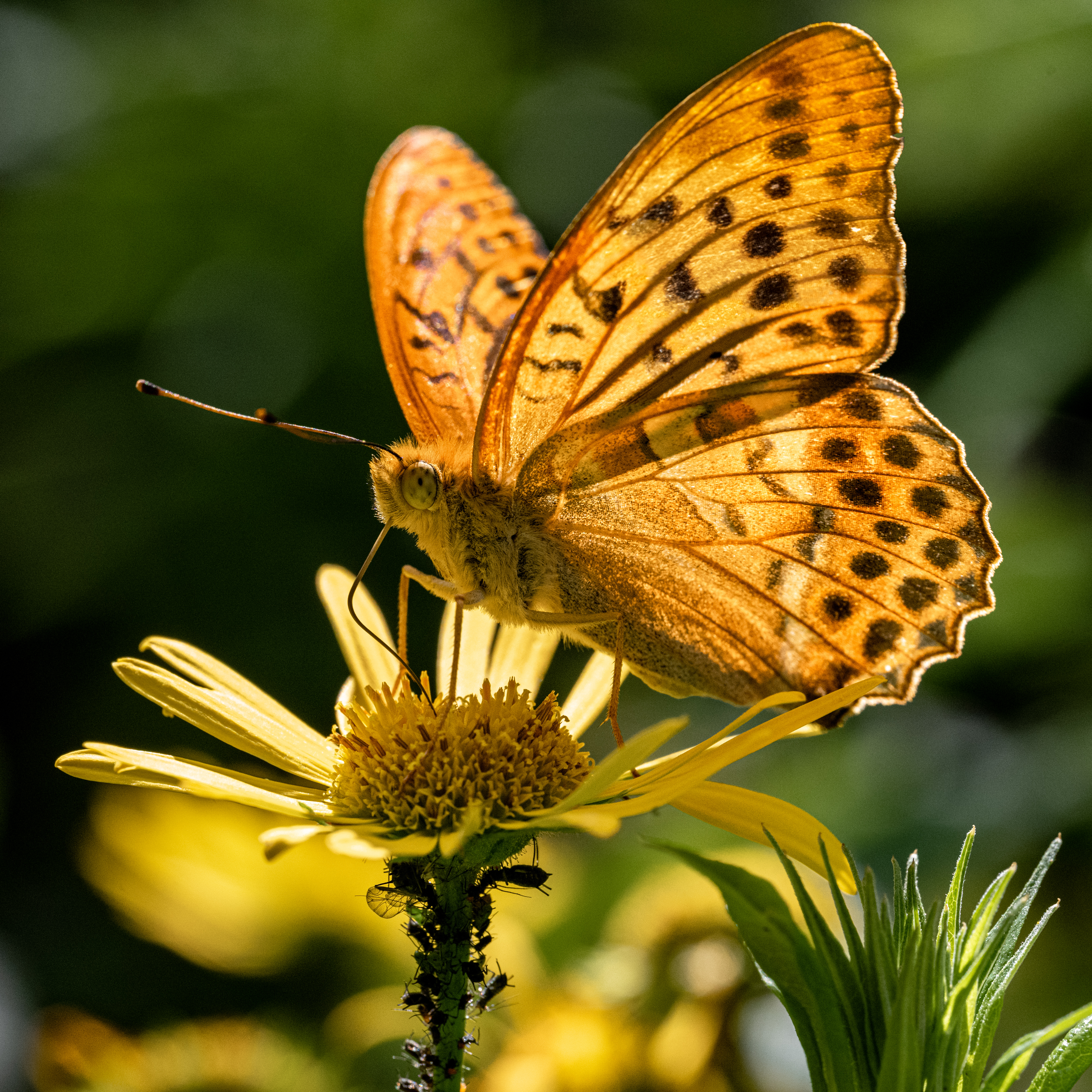
At f/13

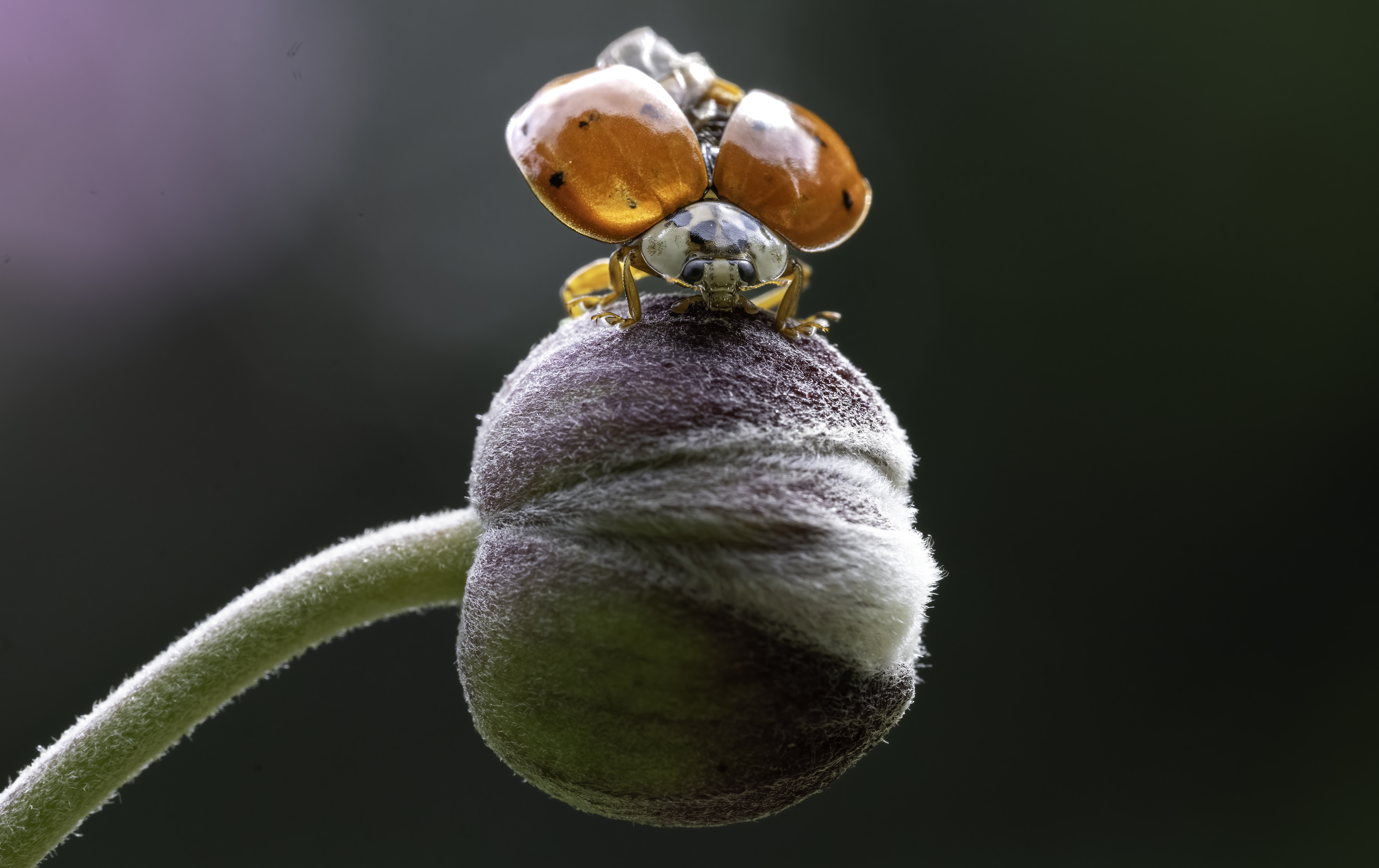
At f/18

== See also ==
- Nikon Z-mount
