= Ring flash =

Camera flash equipment

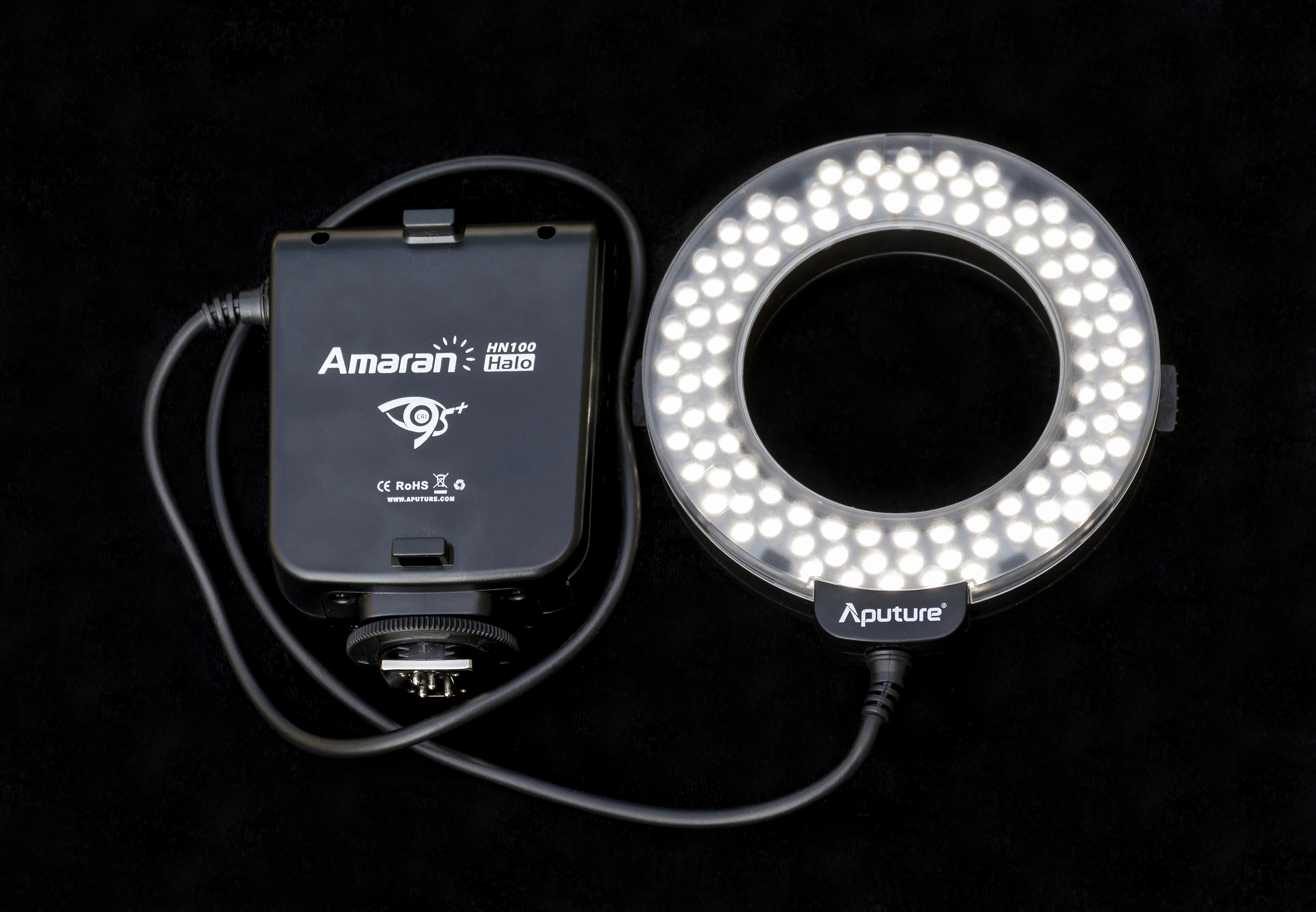
An LED-based ring flash

A ring flash is a photographic flash that surrounds a camera lens with a circular source of light. Unlike conventional flashes which provide a point light source, a ring flash is intended to illuminate a subject with minimal shadows by closely and evenly surrounding the optical axis of the camera lens. This makes it a popular choice for several types of photography, including macro, portrait, and fashion photography. Closely related to the ring flash is the continuous ring light, which has a similar annular shape surrounding the lens; in contrast to the ring flash, which provides an intense light for a short duration, a ring light produces constant illumination at lower intensity for video recording or to see a live preview before capturing photographs.

Ring lights and flashes vary in diameter and thickness, as well as the amount, color temperature, and quality (imperfectly indicated by color rendering index, or CRI) of light output. Some ring lights allow for the adjustment of brightness and color temperature.

== History ==
The ring flash was first invented by Lester A. Dine in 1952 for use in dental photography.

=== Continuous ring light ===
Continuous ring lights are popular for improving picture quality on video calls, social media selfies, and video blogging. For example, Cornell University offers a photo kiosk equipped with a continuous ring light and iPad to take social media profile pictures for students, faculty, staff, and alumni.

Modern continuous ring lights frequently use light-emitting diodes (LEDs) because they are bright, energy-efficient, and capable of producing quality light. Earlier continuous ring light designs used fluorescent tubes, bent into appropriate shapes, to avoid casting heat on the subject.

== Construction ==
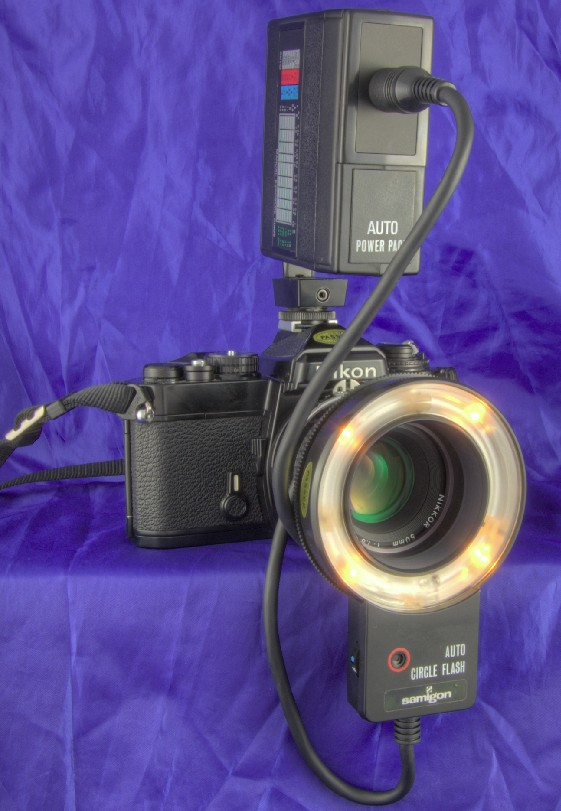
Samigon ring flash unit attached to lens of single-lens reflex camera

Ring flashes may be divided into two types: scientific or macro ring flashes, where the flash tubes are close to the lens, and portrait or fashion ring flashes, where the diameter of the ring is approximately 1 ft (0.30 m), which casts a wider light than the macro ring flash. A macro ring flash typically consists of a power and control unit mounted on a hot shoe, and a circular flash unit mounted on the front of a lens. Power is supplied by batteries in the shoe-mount unit and a cable conveys power and control signals to the circular flash unit. In larger ring flashes, which are typically used for fashion photography, power may be supplied by an external battery or line power supply, or the power supply and light may be combined in one unit.

Light is usually generated by one or more flash tubes or LEDs. In some flash units with multiple flash tubes, each flash tube can be independently controlled, which allows the photographer to vary the contrast or direction of the illumination. Some ring flashes have focusing lenses that result in ideal light distribution at a particular distance from the subject.

Other devices are available that project light in a fashion similar to ring flashes. For example, flash diffusers have no light source of their own, but instead mount in front of a conventional flash unit and transmit the light to a ring-shaped diffuser at the front of the lens. Some other passive light modifiers can shape the light from a conventional shoe-mounted flash into that of a ring flash. These adapters use diffusers and reflectors to "bend" the light in an arc around the lens axis and then emit the light from that arc. These devices maintain any through-the-lens (TTL) lighting functions that are shared by the camera and flash because the timing of the light has not changed.

With some specialized lenses and cameras, most notably the Medical-Nikkor and Yashica Dental Eye, the ringlight is integrated into the lens and exposure is set automatically according to film speed and focusing distance. As their names imply, these were intended for medical uses and offered simplified controls to facilitate photography.

== Applications ==
Ring flashes are commonly used in macro (close-up) photography. When the subject is very close to the camera, the distance of the flash from the optical axis becomes significant. For objects close to the camera, the size of the ring flash is significant and so the light encounters the subject from many angles in the same way that it does with a conventional flash with soft box. This has the effect of further softening any shadows.

Ring flashes are popular in portrait and fashion photography because they soften the shadows created by other, off-axis lights, and create interesting circular highlights in a model's eyes. Ring Lights are also often used in the beauty and cosmetic industry, mostly by make-up artists. This is due to the lightweight and compact features of a ring light that make it suitable for freelance beauty and make-up artists.

Ring flashes became more popular during the COVID-19 pandemic due to the growth of social media, specifically TikTok. Users purchased and used these ring lights to improve their lighting while allowing them to attach their phones between the lights. Their price varies from $10 to $100, and people tend to purchase them online.

Ring flashes are also used in microscopy. The ring flash (usually LED) is mounted on the objective lens of an optical microscope. The main use of this tool is the photographing of microscopic organisms. A ring flash works on a microscope in much the same way as it does on a camera; it reduces reflections while bathing the subject in light.

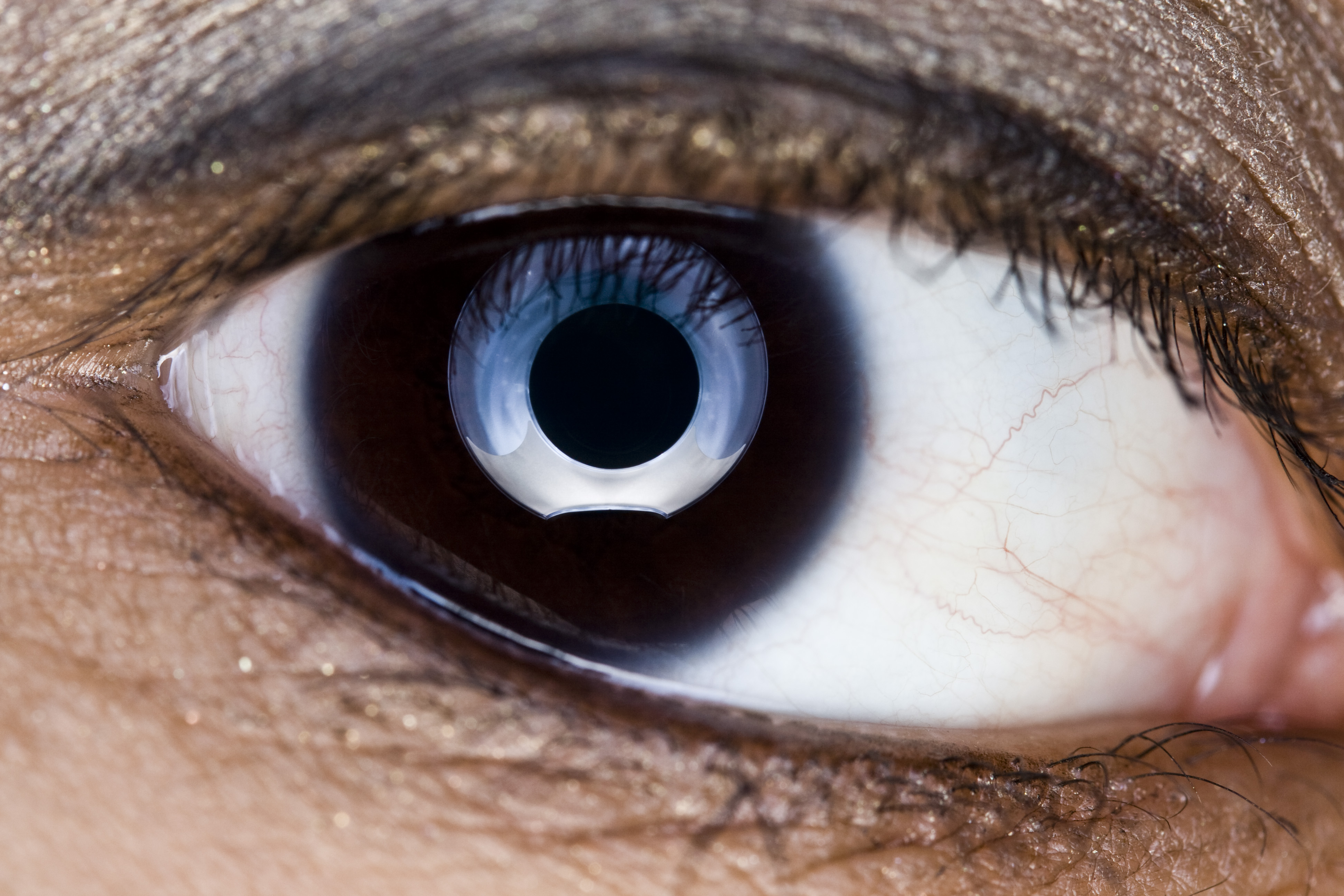
A closeup image of an eye showing reflected ring flash, a common effect in fashion photography

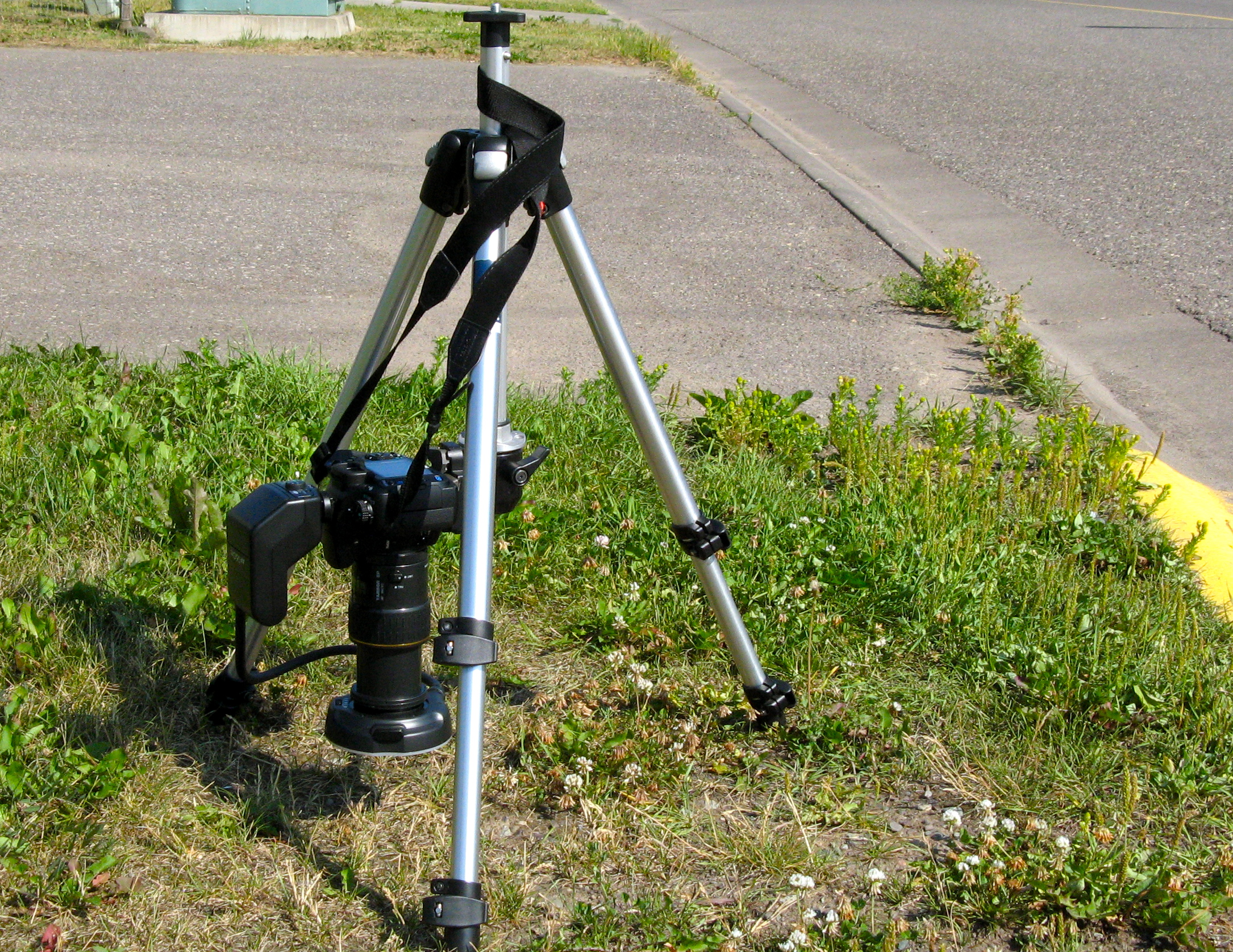
Pentax AF160FC ring flash and Pentax K20D camera with macro lens mounted under tripod for photographing ants

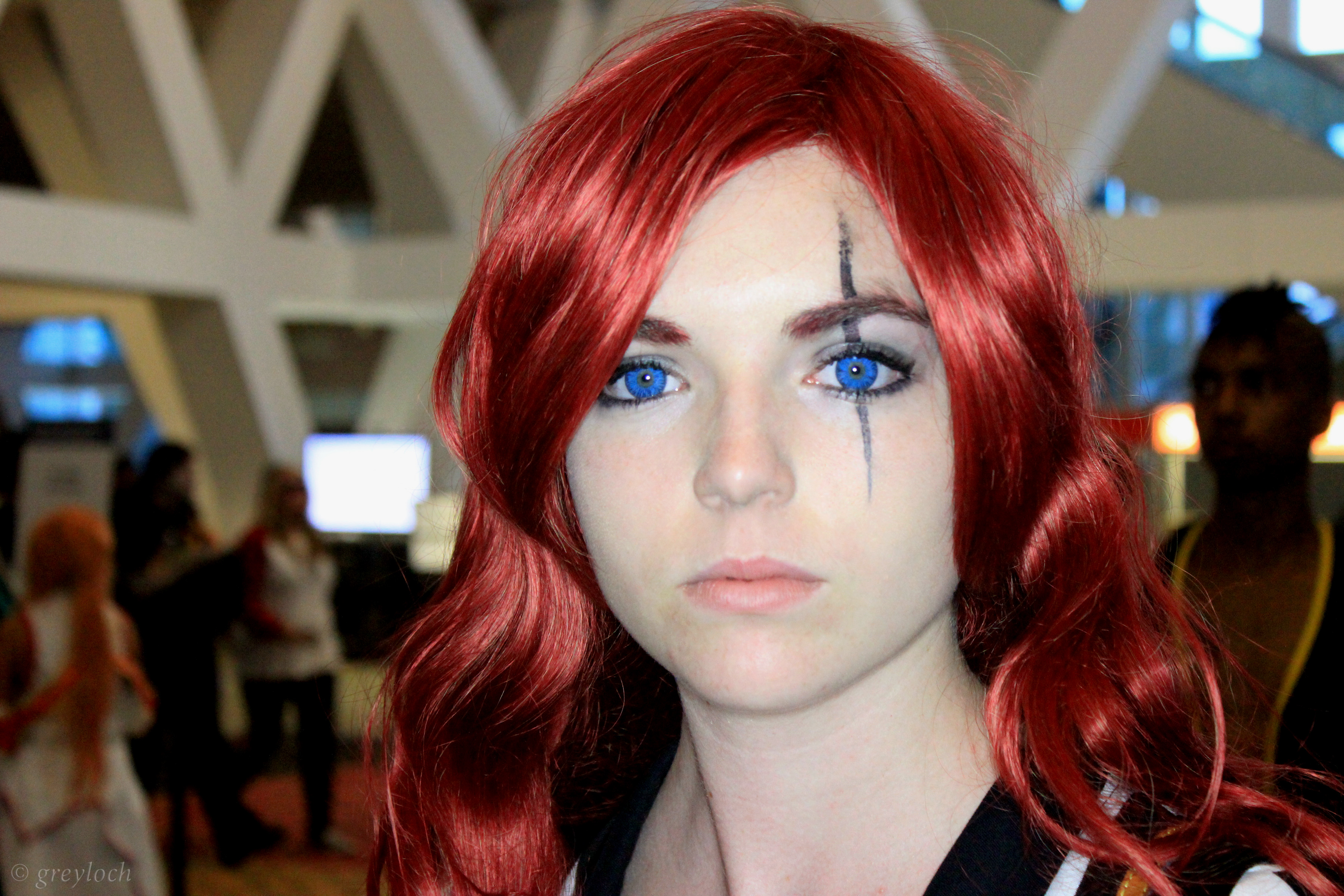
A cosplay model photographed with a ring flash

== See also ==
- Close-up
- Macro photography
- Micrograph
