= Nikon AF-S VR 105mm f/2.8G IF-ED =

AF-S VR Micro-Nikkor 105mm f/2.8G IF-ED
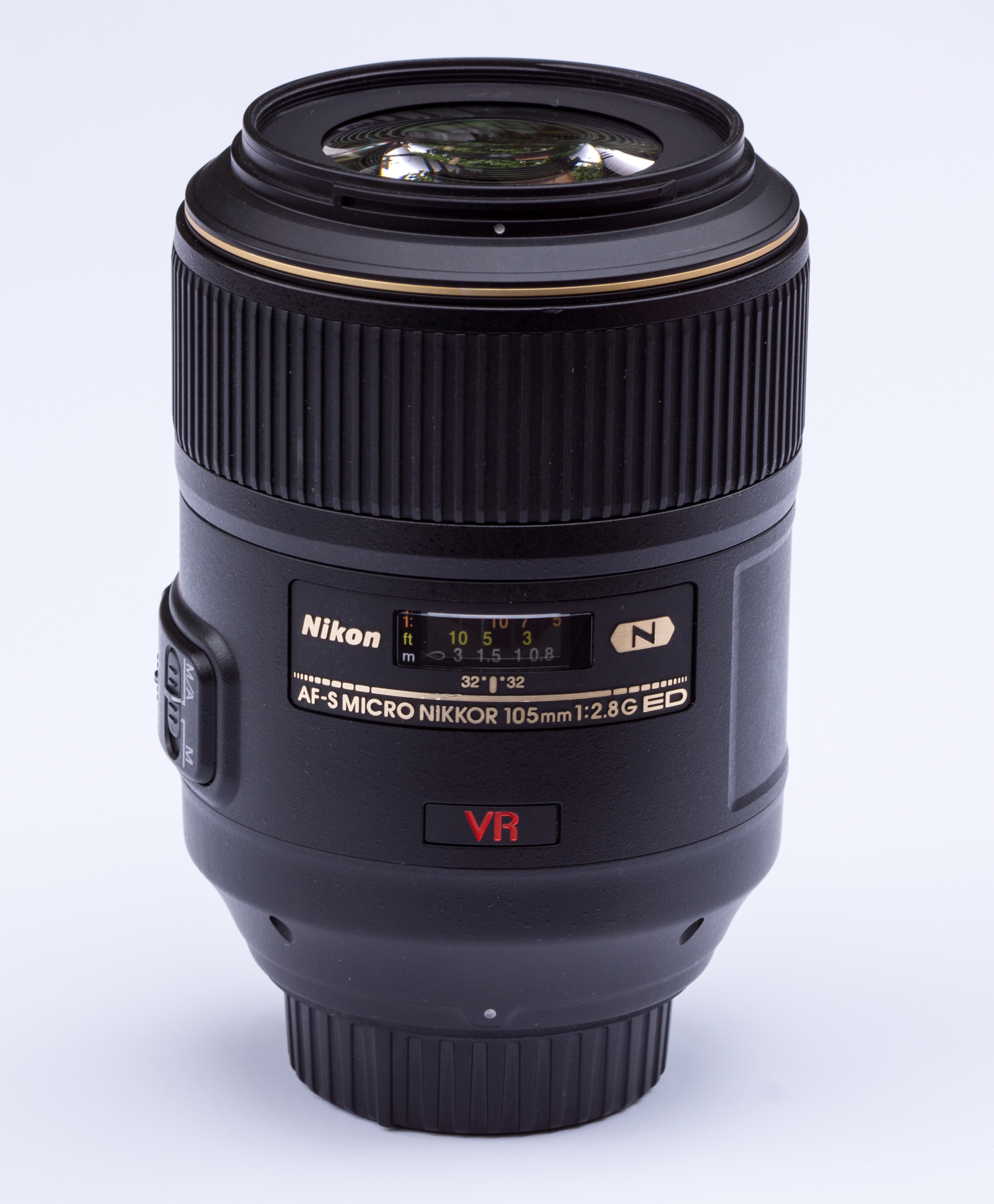
- Maker: Nikon Corporation
- Lens mount: F-mount

Technical data
- Type: Prime
- Focus drive: Silent wave motor
- Focal length: 105mm
- Image format: FX (full-frame)
- Aperture (max/min): f/2.8 - f/32
- Close focus distance: 31.4 cm / 12.0 in.
- Max. magnification: 1:1
- Diaphragm blades: 9 (rounded)
- Construction: 14 elements in 12 groups

Features
- Lens-based stabilization: Yes Yes
- Macro capable: Yes Yes
- Aperture ring: No No
- Application: Macro

Physical
- Max. length: 4.5in / 116mm
- Diameter: 3.3in / 83mm
- Weight: 790g / 27.9 oz.
- Filter diameter: 62 mm

Accessories
- Lens hood: HB-38
- Case: CL-1020

History
- Introduction: 2006
- Successor: Z MC 105 mm f/2.8 VR S (Z-mount)

The Nikon 105mm f/2.8G IF-ED AF-S VR is a macro prime lens produced by Nikon Corporation. It is compatible with FX sized sensors as well as DX format. It is part of Nikon's Micro-Nikkor line of lenses.

== Introduction ==
Nikon announced the lens on 21 February 2006, also making it the first macro lens to feature vibration reduction.

== Features ==
- 105mm focal length (approximately equivalent to a 157.5mm lens when used on a DX format camera)
- 1:1 image reproduction ratio
- Vibration Reduction II technology
- Compact silent wave autofocus motor with full-time manual override
- Nikon F-lens mount
- Nine-blade rounded diaphragm
- Extra-low Dispersion (ED) glass element to reduce chromatic aberration
- Nano crystal coated glass element to reduce internal lens reflections and lens flare
- Super integrated coating (SIC) to reduce flare and ghosts.
- Internal focusing (IF)

== See also ==
- List of Nikon compatible lenses with integrated autofocus-motor
