= Micro-Nikkor =

Family of macro lenses by Nikon

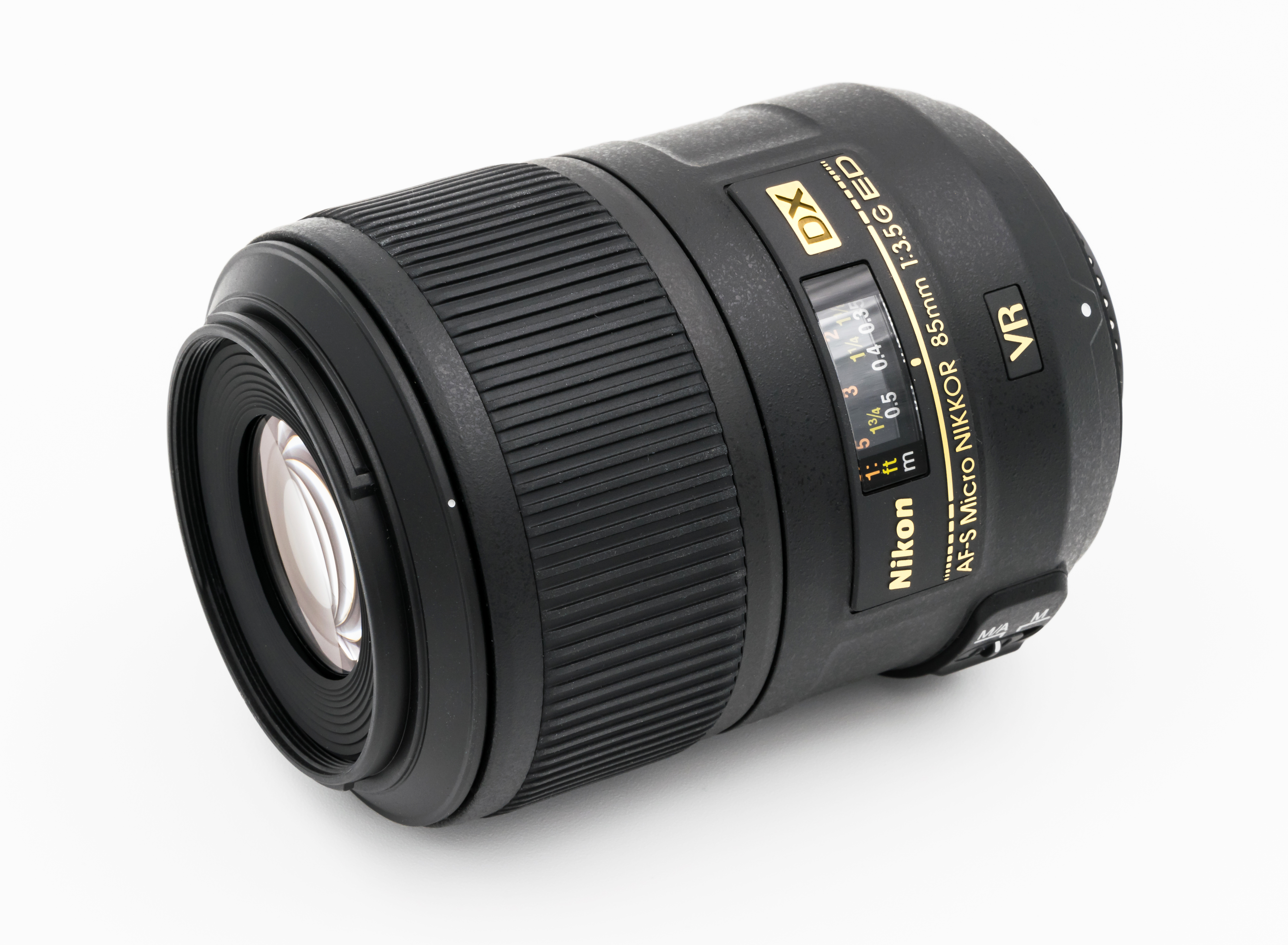
AF-S DX Micro-Nikkor 85mm f/3.5G ED VR lens

Micro-Nikkor is a family of macro lenses produced by Nikon for their 35mm film and digital cameras. The first Micro-Nikkor lens was the 5cm f/3.5 lens introduced in 1956 for Nikon's S-mount rangefinder cameras. It was designed to produce microforms of texts written in Japanese using the Kanji alphabet, a task that, according to Nikon's corporate history, western microphotography systems were ill-equipped to handle, as Kanji text contains many more small details compared to Latin texts. The 5cm f/3.5 was later modified to have a slightly higher focal length of 55mm to accommodate the longer flange-focal distance of Nikon's SLR F-mount.

Longer focal-length Micro-Nikkors were released later, with the 105mm f/4 first appearing in 1970 and the 200mm f/4 being released in 1978. The Micro-Nikkor family of lenses went through a large number of revisions over the decades, the most recent models are designed for the Nikon Z-mount.

A common feature of Micro-Nikkor lenses is that they reach at least 1:2 (half life size) magnification without the need for extension rings. Micro-Nikkor lenses frequently employ compensating diaphragms, which keep the effective aperture constant, even when magnification is changed.

== 50-60mm Micro-Nikkor ==
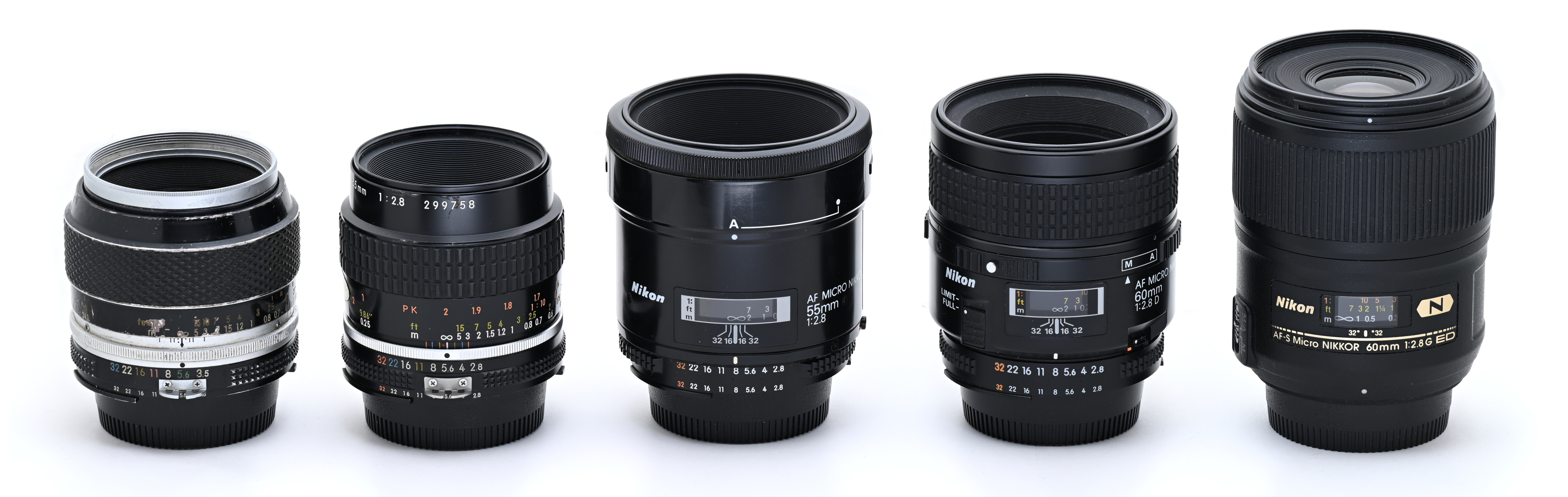
Various versions of the 55mm and 60mm Micro-Nikkor for F-mount, from left to right:
- Micro-Nikkor-P·C Auto 55mm f/3.5, converted to AI
- Micro-Nikkor 55mm f/2.8 AI-s
- AF Micro-Nikkor 55mm f/2.8
- AF Micro-Nikkor 60mm f/2.8D
- AF-S Micro-Nikkor 60mm f/2.8G ED

Comparison of 50-60mm Micro-Nikkor lenses
	5cm f/3.5	5.5cm f/3.5	55mm f/3.5	55mm f/3.5 P	55mm f/2.8 Ai‑S	55mm f/2.8 AF	60mm f/2.8 AF		60mm f/2.8 AF‑S	Z MC 50/2.8
Mount	S and LTM	F	F	F	F	F (AF)	F (AF)	F (AF‑D)	F (AF‑S)	Z
Introduced	1956	1961	1963	1969	1979	1986	1989	1993	2008	2021
Focus method	External								Internal	External
Focus motor	—N/a					Camera motor			Ultrasonic	Stepper
Close range correction (CRC) (Note: Also called "floating elements". Focusing moves more than one group of elements in order to compensate for aberration fluctuation over a wide range of magnifications.)	No				Yes					
Angle of view (diagonal)	46°				43°–28°		39°–20°		41°–28°	47°–31°30'
Magnification (without macro rings)	Short mount (Note: S-mount version uses the focusing helicoid of the camera for near-infinity focus and requires using a bellows for macro focus.)	1:1	1:2		1:2	1:1				
Working distance (Note: Mechanical working distance from front of filter ring to the subject. Nikon sometimes specified the optical working distance (distance between the vertex of the first element to the subject), which is larger for most of these lenses, as their front elements are deeply recessed.)	-		11cm	11cm	11cm		7cm		5cm	6cm
Aperture	Preset		Auto							
Compensating diaphragm (Note: The lens or camera mechanically or electronically compensates for the change in effective aperture as magnification is adjusted, therefore keeping exposure constant. Macro lenses without a compensating diaphragm either require all light to be exposed through-the-lens (TTL) or require manually adjusting exposure when magnification is changed.)	No	No	Yes	No	No	Yes				
Diaphragm blades	7	7	6		7	7	7		9 rounded	9 rounded
Aperture at magnification (Note: The effective aperture diminishes with all lenses as magnification is increased. A simple unit focus design will loose two stops when set for life-size reproduction (1:1). Designs with CRC can counteract this to some degree.)	-	f/7–44	f/5.3–48		f/4–45	f/5.3–64	f/5–57		f/4.8–57	f/5.6–32
Aperture at infinity	f/3.5–22	f/3.5–22	f/3.5–32		f/2.8–32	f/2.8–32	f/2.8–32		f/2.8–32	f/2.8–22
Elements/groups	5/4	5/4		5/4	6/5		8/7		12/9	10/7
Filter size	34.5mm	52mm				62mm				46mm
Diameter	?	65mm	66mm	66mm	64mm	74mm	70mm		73mm	75mm
Length	?	53mm	56mm	55mm	62mm	74mm	75mm		89mm	66mm
Weight	145g	325g	240g	240g	290g	420g	450g		425g	260g

== 105mm Micro-Nikkor ==
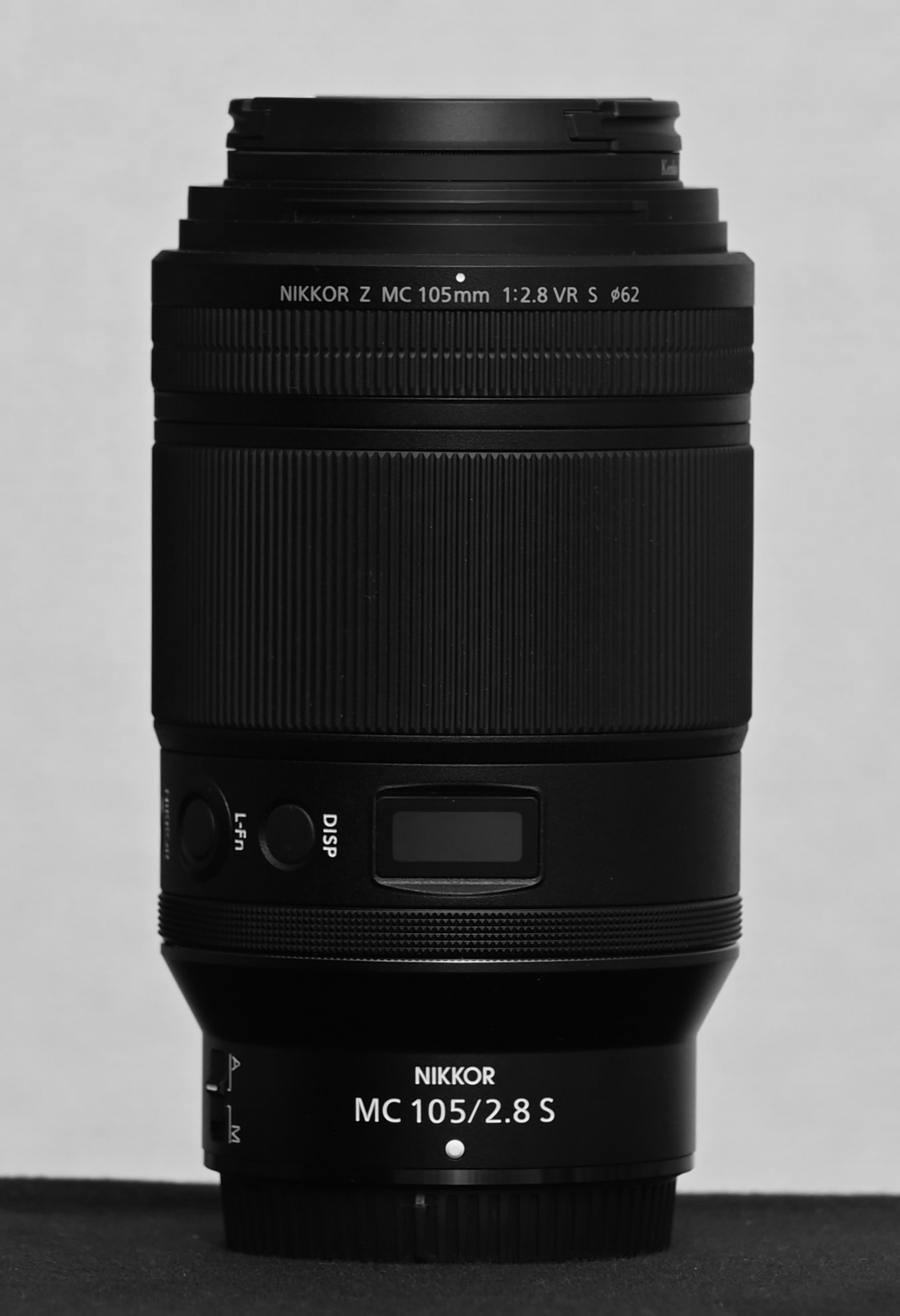
Nikkor Z MC 105 mm f/2.8 VR S lens

The 105mm Micro-Nikkor series started in 1970, with the newest lens being the Z MC 105/2.8 VR S for the Z-mount.

The 105mm f/4.5 UV lens, which is called both a Micro-Nikkor and a UV-Nikkor in the literature, is a highly specialized lens for ultraviolet photography made using quartz and phosphate glass instead of regular optical glass. This permits light transmission from roughly 200nm to over 900nm (normal optical glass blocks most UV light). It is specifically corrected for a low amount of focus shift between visible light and UV light, therefore permits focusing for UV using visible light. It had a second production run in 2006 at Tochigi Nikon.

Comparison of 105mm Micro-Nikkor lenses
	105mm f/4 P	105mm f/4	105mm f/4.5 UV	105mm f/2.8 Ai‑S	105mm f/2.8 AF		105mm f/2.8 AF‑S VR G	Z MC 105/2.8 VR S
Mount	F	F	F	F	F (AF)	F (AF‑D)	F (AF‑S)	Z
Introduced	1970	1975	1985, 2006	1983	1990	1993	2006	2021
Focus method	Bellows	External					Internal	
Focus motor	—N/a				Camera motor		Ultrasonic	Stepper
Close range correction (CRC)	No			Yes				
Angle of view (diagonal)	23°20'			23°–15°	25°–14°		24°–7.3°	24°–9°
Magnification (without macro rings)	Short mount	1:2			1:1			
Working distance	-	28cm	27cm	24cm	13.3cm		15.4cm	13.4cm
Aperture	Preset	Auto						
Compensating diaphragm	No				Yes			
Diaphragm blades	12	7	7	7	7		9 rounded	9 rounded
Aperture at magnification	-	f/6–48	f/6–48	f/4–45	f/5–57		f/4.8–57	f/4.5–51
Aperture at infinity	f/4–32	f/4–32	f/4–32	f/2.8–32	f/2.8–32		f/2.8–32	f/2.8–32
Elements/groups	5/3		6/6 (quartz)	10/9	9/8		14/12	16/11
Filter size	52mm						62mm	62mm
Diameter	64mm	75mm	69mm	67mm	75mm		83mm	85mm
Length	44mm	96mm	108mm	84mm	105mm		116mm	140mm
Weight	230g	500g	515g	515g	560g		750g	630g

== 200mm Micro-Nikkor ==
Comparison of 200mm Micro-Nikkor lenses
	200mm f/4 IF	200mm f/4 AF‑D
Mount	F	F (AF‑D)
Introduced	1978	1993
Focus method	Internal	
Focus motor	—N/a	Camera motor
Close range correction (CRC)	?	Yes
Angle of view (diagonal)	12°20'	12°–2°
Magnification (without macro rings)	1:2	1:1
Working distance	49.2 cm (19.4 in)	26.1 cm (10.3 in)
Aperture	Auto	
Compensating diaphragm	No	Yes
Diaphragm blades	9	9
Aperture at magnification	f/4–32 (Note: Exposure factors apply when extension is used to achieve a magnification ratio greater than 1:10. If the lens itself is used without extension, the effective aperture does not change at higher magnification ratios.)	f/5.3–45
Aperture at infinity	f/4–32	f/4–32
Elements/groups	9/6	13/8
Filter size	52mm	62mm
Diameter	67 mm (2.6 in)	76 mm (3.0 in)
Length	180 mm (7.1 in)	202 mm (8.0 in)
Weight	800 g (28 oz)	1,190 g (42 oz)

The 200mm Micro-Nikkor was introduced in 1978 as a manual focus lens for the F-mount, featuring internal focusing, so the physical length of the lens does not change as it is focused closer; it has a maximum magnification ratio of 1:2, similar to other manual focus Micro-Nikkor lenses, but the long focal length gives it a longer working distance, with a closest focus distance of 0.71 m (28 in). Instead of a macro extension tube, Nikon recommends using a teleconverter (TC-300/301), providing continuous focus from infinity to a reproduction ratio of 1:1.

It was replaced in 1993 with a completely redesigned autofocus lens, which also incorporates internal focusing and focuses from infinity to a reproduction ratio of 1:1 at a marked distance of 0.5 m (20 in). The 200mm f/4 AF-D uses a mechanical autofocus linkage to the AF motor in the camera, which makes it slow and noisy, as well as unable to autofocus on low-end DSLRs and Nikon mirroless cameras using the FTZ adapter. Unlike the 50-60mm and 105mm Micro-Nikkor, the 200mm Micro-Nikkor was never updated to incorporate an in-lens ultrasonic motor (AF-S). Instead, it was discontinued in the early 2020s, with no replacement announced.

The apparent discontinuation of the 200mm line is likely due to relatively poor sales numbers, as the 200mm AF-D only sold approx. 30'000 units in its 30 year cycle, while the 105mm AF lenses sold well over 300'000 units in a much shorter time span, and the 105mm AF-S lens sold over 750'000 units.

== 70-180mm Zoom Micro-Nikkor ==
70–180mm Zoom-Micro-Nikkor lens
	70–180mm f/4.5-5.6
Mount	F (AF‑D)
Introduced	1997
Focus method	Helicoid
Focus motor	Camera motor
Close range correction (CRC)	Yes
Angle of view (diagonal)	34°20'–13°40'
Magnification (without macro rings)	1:3.21 (70mm) to 1:1.33 (180mm)
Working distance	11.24 cm (4.43 in)
Aperture	Auto
Compensating diaphragm	Yes
Diaphragm blades	9
Aperture at magnification	f/4.5-5.6–32
Aperture at infinity	f/4.5-5.6–32
Elements/groups	18/14
Filter size	62mm
Diameter	75 mm (3.0 in)
Length	175 mm (6.9 in)
Weight	1,010 g (36 oz)

The 70-180mm f/4.5–5.6 AF-D Micro-Nikkor was introduced in 1997 and discontinued in 2005. It reached a magnification of 1:1.3 and 1:1 with a 6T close-up lens. The aperture is fully compensated for zoom and focus, and does not change at the minimum focusing distance. It has an additional working distance scale besides the usual focus distance and magnification scales found on other Micro-Nikkors. The main advantage of a macro zoom lens is the ability to change magnification without changing the subject-camera distance, i.e. without moving the camera.

The lens is fitted with a focus range-limiting switch with two positions: Full and Limit, restricting focus to greater than or less than 80 cm (31 in), depending on the current focusing distance. Zooming is completely internal and does not change the length of the lens. The front of the lens extends approximately 2 in (51 mm) but does not rotate at its minimum focusing distance of 0.37 m (15 in), giving it a working distance of 112.4 mm (4.43 in).

This lens should not be confused with the 70-180mm lens announced by Nikon in 2023, which is a general-purpose f/2.8 zoom for Nikon Z and not a macro zoom.

== Specialty lenses ==
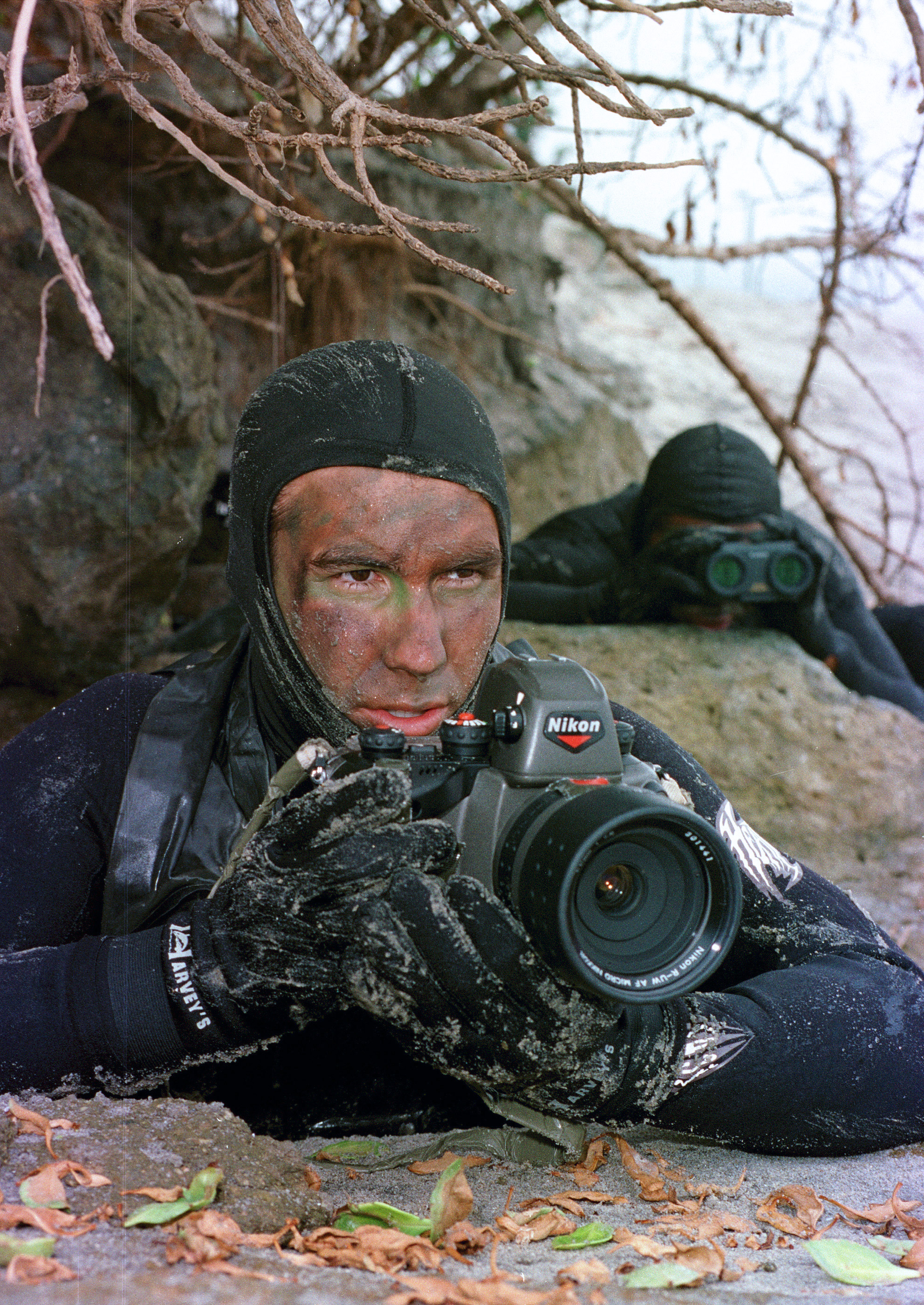
US Navy SEAL using a Nikonos/Kodak underwater camera with the 50mm Micro-Nikkor mounted.

The perspective control PC-E lenses 85mm f/2.8 and 45mm f/2.8 ED are designated Micro-Nikkor as well, since they reach a magnification of 1:2.

A Micro-Nikkor lens was also offered for the Nikonos RS underwater camera system, the Nikon R-UW AF 50mm f/2.8 Micro-Nikkor. It reaches 1:1 magnification.

Medical-Nikkor lenses
	120mm f/4IF	200mm f/5.6
Mount	F	F
Introduced	Jan 1981	Dec 1962
Focus method	Internal	External (fixed)
Focus motor	—N/a	
Close range correction (CRC)	No	
Angle of view (diagonal)	18°50'	12°20'
Magnification (without macro rings)	1:1; 2:1 with supplemental lens	1:15; 1:8 to 3:1 with supplemental lenses
Working distance		
Aperture	Auto, linked to magnification	
Compensating diaphragm	Yes	Yes
Diaphragm blades		
Aperture at magnification		
Aperture at infinity	f/4–32	f/5.6–45
Elements/groups	9/6 (+2/1)	4/4 (+2)
Filter size	49mm	38mm
Diameter	98 mm (3.9 in)	80 mm (3.1 in)
Length	150 mm (5.9 in)	176 mm (6.9 in)
Weight	890 g (31 oz)	670 g (24 oz)

Nikon also produced several special-purpose lenses which are grouped with close-up equipment alongside the Micro-Nikkor family of lenses. These include the 105mm f/4.5 UV lens mentioned above, as well as 120mm f/4 and 200mm f/5.6 Medical-Nikkor lenses for medical applications.

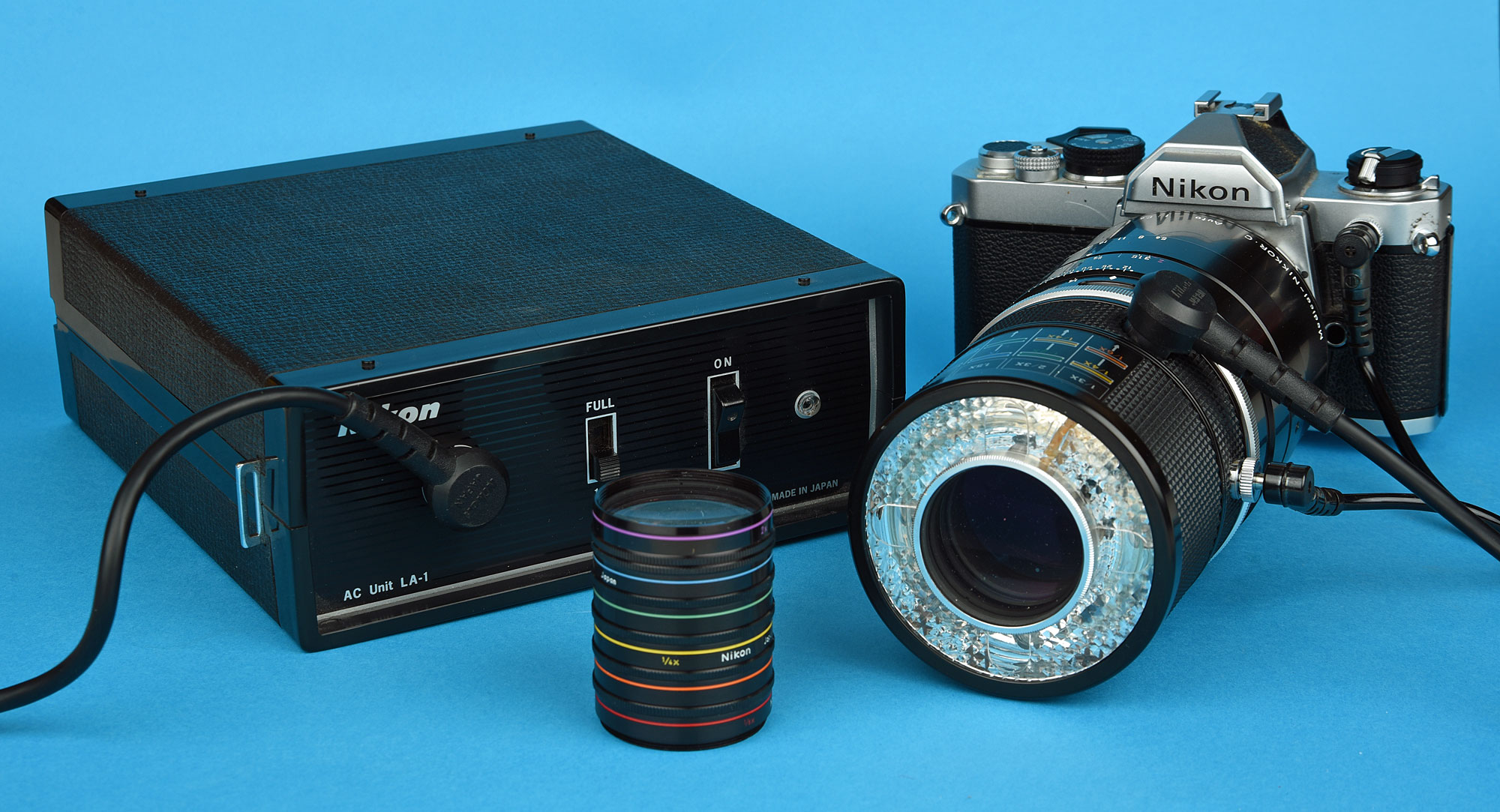
Medical-Nikkor 200 mm f/5.6 with accessory lenses and LA-1 power unit

The Medical-Nikkor lenses have built-in ring flashes and are designed with a fixed focus distance; as the name suggests, these are specialized lenses designed for medical and dental applications. They are meant to be set to a desired reproduction ratio, then focused by moving the camera to the appropriate distance. Both Medical-Nikkor lenses have optional data imprinting, which projects the reproduction ratio onto the recorded image.

The older 200mm Medical-Nikkor was introduced in 1962 and is supplied as a kit with six supplemental close-up lenses to change the reproduction ratio in discrete steps, which is accomplished by mounting one or two of the accessory lenses. When two accessory lenses are stacked, the weaker of the two lenses is mounted closer to the parent lens.

Medical-Nikkor reproduction ratios
200 mm f/5.6			Repro. ratio	120 mm f/4 IF	
Acc. lens		Focus dist.	Repro. ratio	Focus dist. (lens only)	Focus dist. (w/ 2×)
(none)		3.350 m (131.9 in)	1:15	—N/a	
—N/a			1:11	1.60 m (63 in)	—N/a
1/8×		1.880 m (74.0 in)	1:8	1.20 m (47 in)	—N/a
1/6×		1.336 m (52.6 in)	1:6	0.95 m (37 in)	—N/a
—N/a			1:5	0.83 m (33 in)	—N/a
1/4×		0.890 m (35.0 in)	1:4	0.70 m (28 in)	—N/a
1/6×	1/4×	0.635 m (25.0 in)	1:3	0.60 m (24 in)	—N/a
—N/a			1:2.5	0.53 m (21 in)	—N/a
1/2×		0.446 m (17.6 in)	1:2	0.47 m (19 in)	—N/a
1/4×	1/2×	0.326 m (12.8 in)	1:1.5	0.40 m (16 in)	—N/a
—N/a			1:1.2	0.37 m (15 in)	—N/a
—N/a			1:1.25 (0.8×)	—N/a	0.330 m (13.0 in)
—N/a			1:1.17 (0.85×)	—N/a	0.325 m (12.8 in)
—N/a			1:1.11 (0.9×)	—N/a	0.320 m (12.6 in)
—N/a			1:1.05 (0.95×)	—N/a	0.315 m (12.4 in)
1×		0.221 m (8.7 in)	1:1	0.35 m (14 in)	0.310 m (12.2 in)
—N/a			1.1:1	—N/a	0.300 m (11.8 in)
—N/a			1.2:1	—N/a	0.290 m (11.4 in)
—N/a			1.3:1	—N/a	0.285 m (11.2 in)
1/2×	1×	0.154 m (6.1 in)	1.5:1	—N/a	0.275 m (10.8 in)
—N/a			1.8:1	—N/a	0.270 m (10.6 in)
2×		0.108 m (4.3 in)	2:1	—N/a	0.260 m (10.2 in)
1×	2×	0.072 m (2.8 in)	3:1	—N/a	

Its successor, the Medical-Nikkor 120 mm f/4IF, was released in late 1981 with an internal focusing mechanism that moves internal elements to adjust the focus distance, resulting in a continuously variable reproduction ratio range from 1:11 to 1:1. It was supplied with a two-element cemented achromat close-up lens; when it was mounted, the reproduction ratio is variable from 0.8:1 to 2:1. Compared to the older 200 mm lens, the 120 mm lens has a longer working distance when capturing equivalent reproduction ratios of 1:2 and greater, despite the ostensibly shorter focal length, due to the internal focusing design. However, the older lens has a greater range of available magnifications.

== DX Micro-Nikkor ==
Comparison of DX Micro-Nikkor lenses
	AF-S 40mm f/2.8G	AF-S 85mm f/3.5G ED
Mount	F (AF-S)	F (AF‑S)
Introduced	2011	2009
Focus method	External	Internal
Focus motor	Silent Wave, in-lens	
Close range correction (CRC)	Yes	Yes
Angle of view (diagonal)	38°50'	18°50'
Magnification (without macro rings)	1:1	1:1
Working distance	5.2 cm (2.0 in)	14.1 cm (5.6 in)
Aperture	Auto	
Compensating diaphragm	No	No
Diaphragm blades	7	9
Aperture at magnification	f/4.2–36	f/5–45
Aperture at infinity	f/2.8–22	f/3.5–32
Elements/groups	9/7	14/10
Filter size	52mm	52mm
Diameter	68.5 mm (2.7 in)	73 mm (2.9 in)
Length	64.5 mm (2.5 in)	98.5 mm (3.9 in)
Weight	235 g (8.3 oz)	355 g (12.5 oz)

Nikon released the AF-S Micro-Nikkor 85mm f/3.5G VR in 2009 for their DX (APS-C) line of DSLRs. The 85mm is an internal-focus lens with VR image stabilization. In 2011, the AF-S Micro-Nikkor 40mm f/2.8G was released, which has an extending focus mechanism. These lenses achieve a 1:1 magnification, which is equivalent to 1.5:1 magnification on 35mm film or a full-frame camera.

== See also ==
- Nikon S-mount
- Nikon F-mount
- Nikon Z-mount
