= Nikon AF-S DX Zoom-Nikkor 55-200mm f/4-5.6G =

Photographic lens

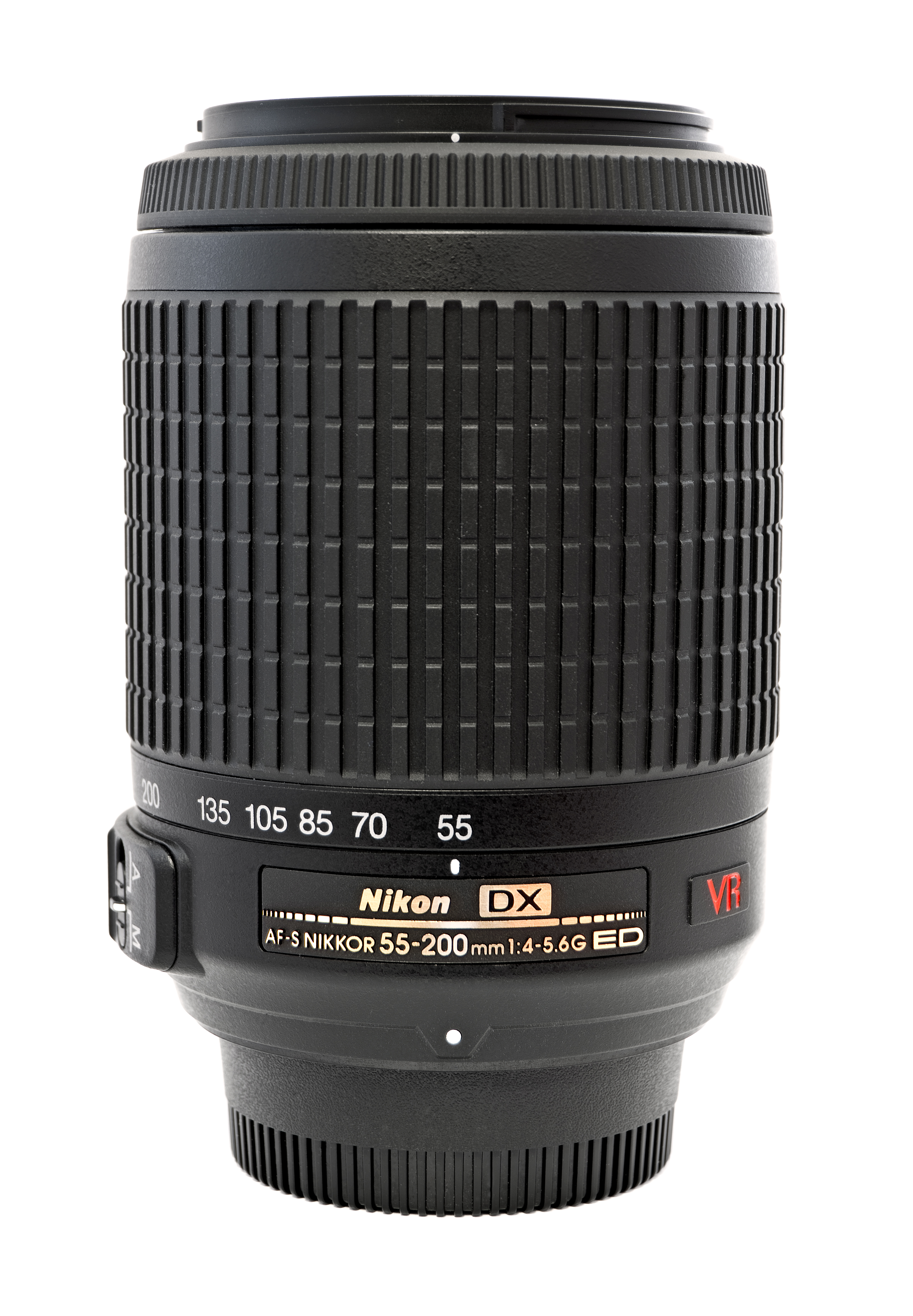
VR version of the 55-200mm

The 55-200mm AF-S lens is a medium telephoto zoom lens manufactured by Nikon for use on Nikon DX format digital SLR cameras. It comes in three variants:

- AF-S DX Zoom-Nikkor 55-200mm f/4–5.6G ED, released in 2005
- AF-S DX Zoom-Nikkor 55-200mm f/4–5.6G VR IF-ED, released in 2007, adds internal focusing (IF) and, most notably, vibration reduction (VR).
- AF-S DX NIKKOR 55-200mm f/4–5.6G ED VR II, released 2015 introduced VR II.

Like all lenses in the DX format, the 55-200mm casts a smaller image circle than lenses for full-frame 35mm cameras and is therefore only compatible with cameras having APS-C-sized sensors (or vignetting will result).

Nikon introduced the 55-200mm in 2005 and refreshed it in 2007. As an inexpensive, compact, and lightweight telephoto, it complements the D40 and D60 entry level digital SLR cameras Nikon brings to market. Photozone noted the newer VR model has a better build quality than the earlier non-VR model.

Some reviewers praised its value and optical performance, but criticized its handling, noting a stiff zoom ring, diminutive focus ring, and difficulty switching to manual focus. Because the lens has a completely plastic body, including the mount, as is usual for lenses in this market segment, it is much lighter, but also less sturdy, than more expensive lenses of comparable size and capability which belong to a higher priced, and more professionally oriented, market segment.

== Specifications ==
Attribute	AF-S DX Zoom-Nikkor 55-200mm f/4–5.6G ED	AF-S DX Zoom-Nikkor 55-200mm f/4–5.6G VR IF-ED	AF-S DX NIKKOR 55-200mm f/4-5.6G ED VR II
AF	Yes Yes		
Image Stabilization	No No	Yes Yes	
Maximum aperture	f/4–5.6		
Minimum aperture	f/22–32		
Weight	255g	335g	300g
Maximum diameter	68mm	73mm	
Length	79mm	99.5mm	83mm
Filter diameter	52mm		
Picture angle	28°50' - 8°		
Groups/elements	9/13	11/15	9/13
# of diaphragm blades	9 (rounded)	7 (rounded)	
Closest focusing distance	0.95m	1.1m	
Release date	2005	2007	2015
MSRP $	$170	$250	$350

== See also ==
- List of Nikon compatible lenses with integrated autofocus-motor
