= Nikon AF-S DX VR Zoom-Nikkor 18-200mm f/3.5-5.6G IF-ED =

Superzoom photographic lens

AF-S DX VR Zoom-Nikkor 18-200mm f/3.5-5.6G IF-ED
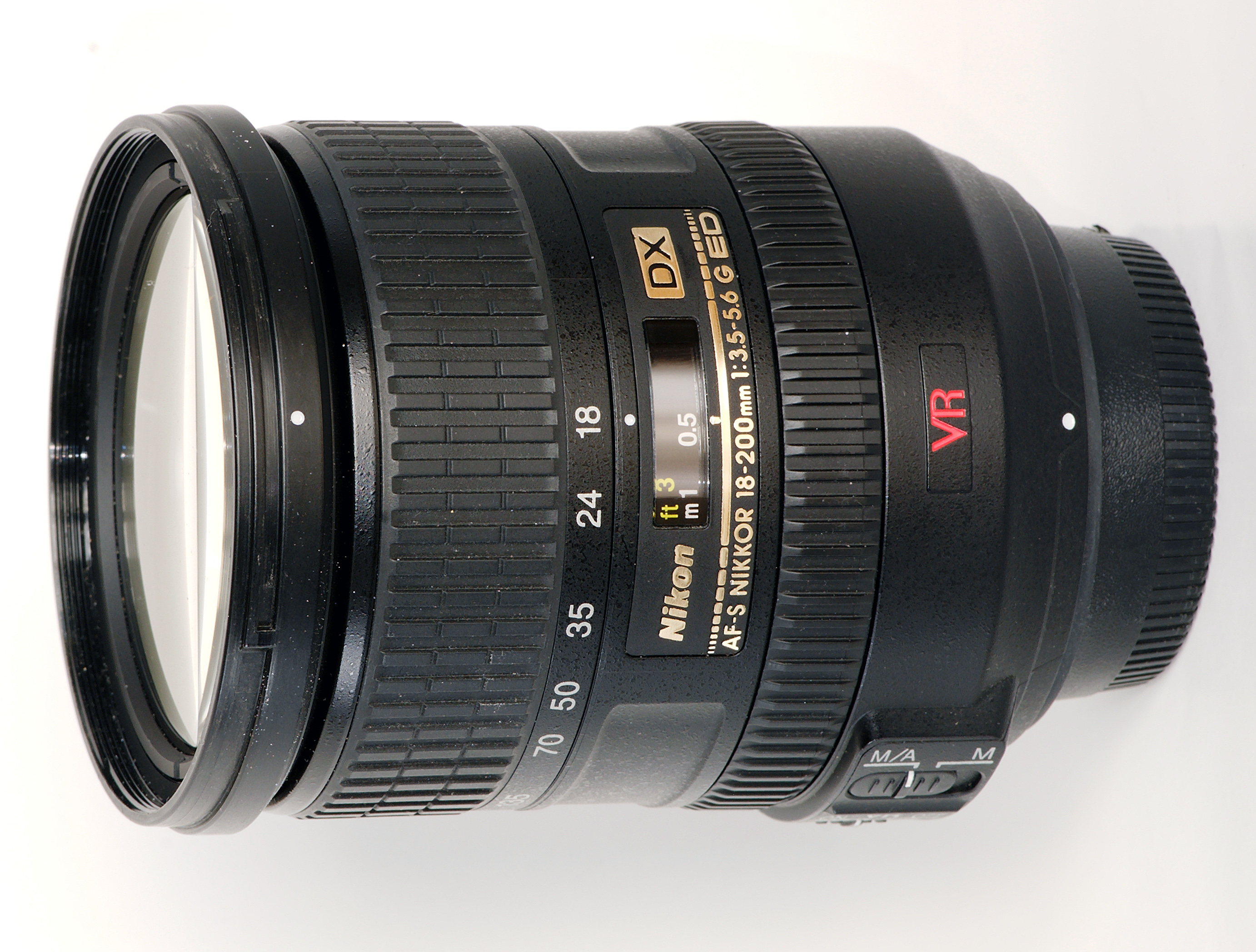
- Maker: Nikon
- Lens mount: F-mount

Technical data
- Type: Zoom
- Focal length: 18-200mm
- Focal length (35mm equiv.): 27-300mm
- Crop factor: 1.5
- Aperture (max/min): f/3.5 - f/22 (wide) f/5.6 - f/29 (tele)
- Close focus distance: 0.50m
- Max. magnification: 1/4.5
- Diaphragm blades: 7 (rounded)
- Construction: 16 elements in 12 groups

Features
- Ultrasonic motor: Yes Yes
- Lens-based stabilization: Yes Yes
- Macro capable: No No
- Application: Wide angle - telephoto

Physical
- Max. length: 162 mm (@ 200mm)
- Diameter: 77mm
- Weight: 560 g
- Filter diameter: 72mm

Accessories
- Lens hood: HB-35
- Case: CL-1018

Angle of view
- Diagonal: 76° – 8°

History
- Introduction: November 2005
- Discontinuation: July 2009

The Nikon AF-S DX VR Zoom-Nikkor 18-200mm f/3.5-5.6G IF-ED is an image stabilised superzoom lens manufactured by Nikon for use on Nikon DX format digital SLR cameras. It provides a single-lens "walk-around" solution for wide-angle through to telephoto shots, as well as close-up photography.

== Introduction ==
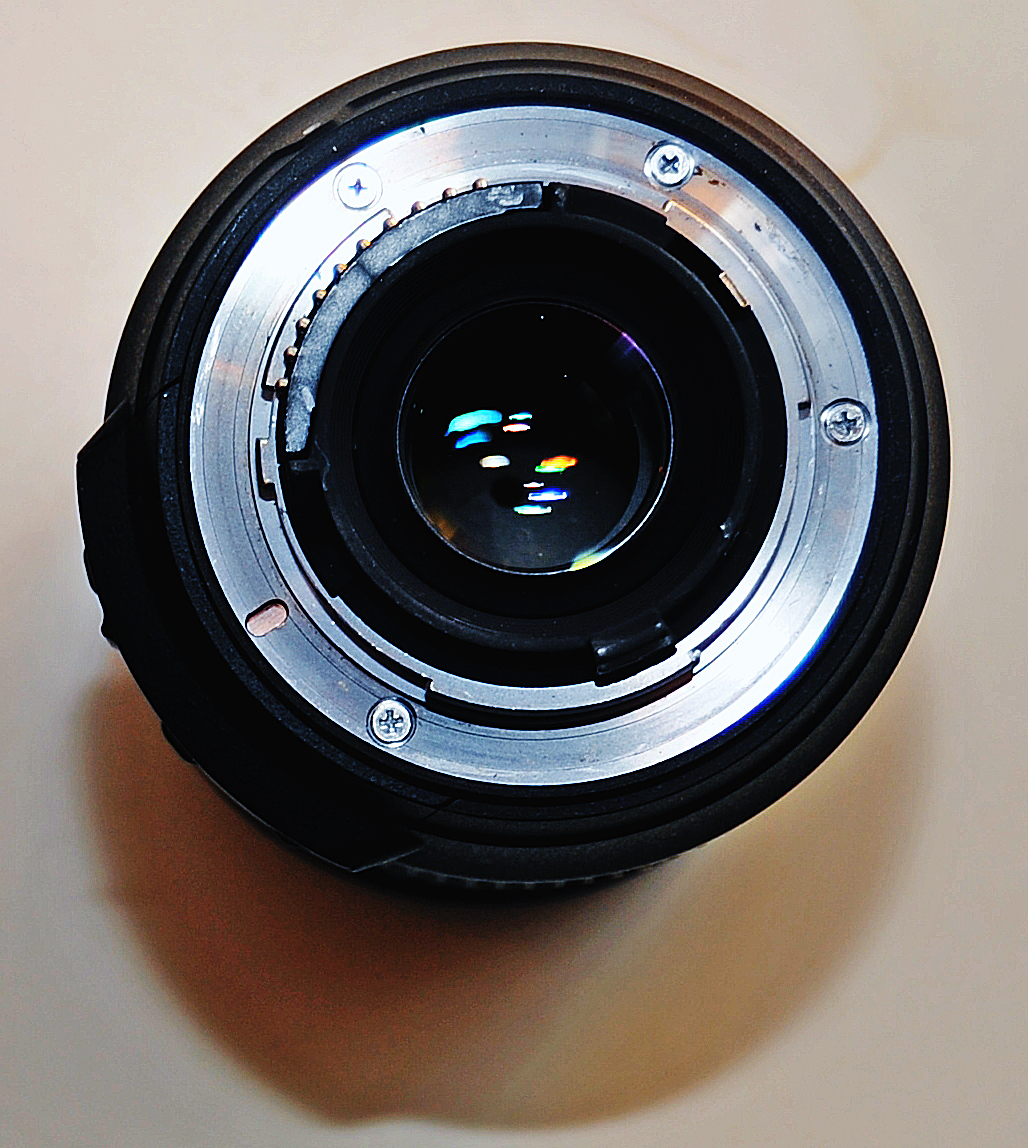
F-mount on 18-200mm DX lens with mechanical and electrical contacts

Nikon announced the first version of this lens on November 1, 2005. The lens offers a 35 film equivalent focal length range of 27-300mm, with a compact silent wave autofocus motor featuring full-time manual override and internal focusing. Its second generation Vibration Reduction technology claims to provide compensation equivalent to an increase in shutter speed of four stops. The lens has sixteen lens elements in twelve groups, with two ED glass elements to reduce chromatic aberration, and three aspherical elements to reduce image distortion. Although this lens was designed for use on Nikon DX format DSLRs, its Nikon F lens mount allows it to be used on Nikon full-frame DSLRs, albeit with vignetting due to a smaller image circle. This lens also works with teleconverters.

On July 30, 2009, Nikon announced an updated variant, the AF-S DX NIKKOR 18-200mm f/3.5-5.6G ED VR II. It adds a zoom lock to prevent zoom creep.

== Reception ==
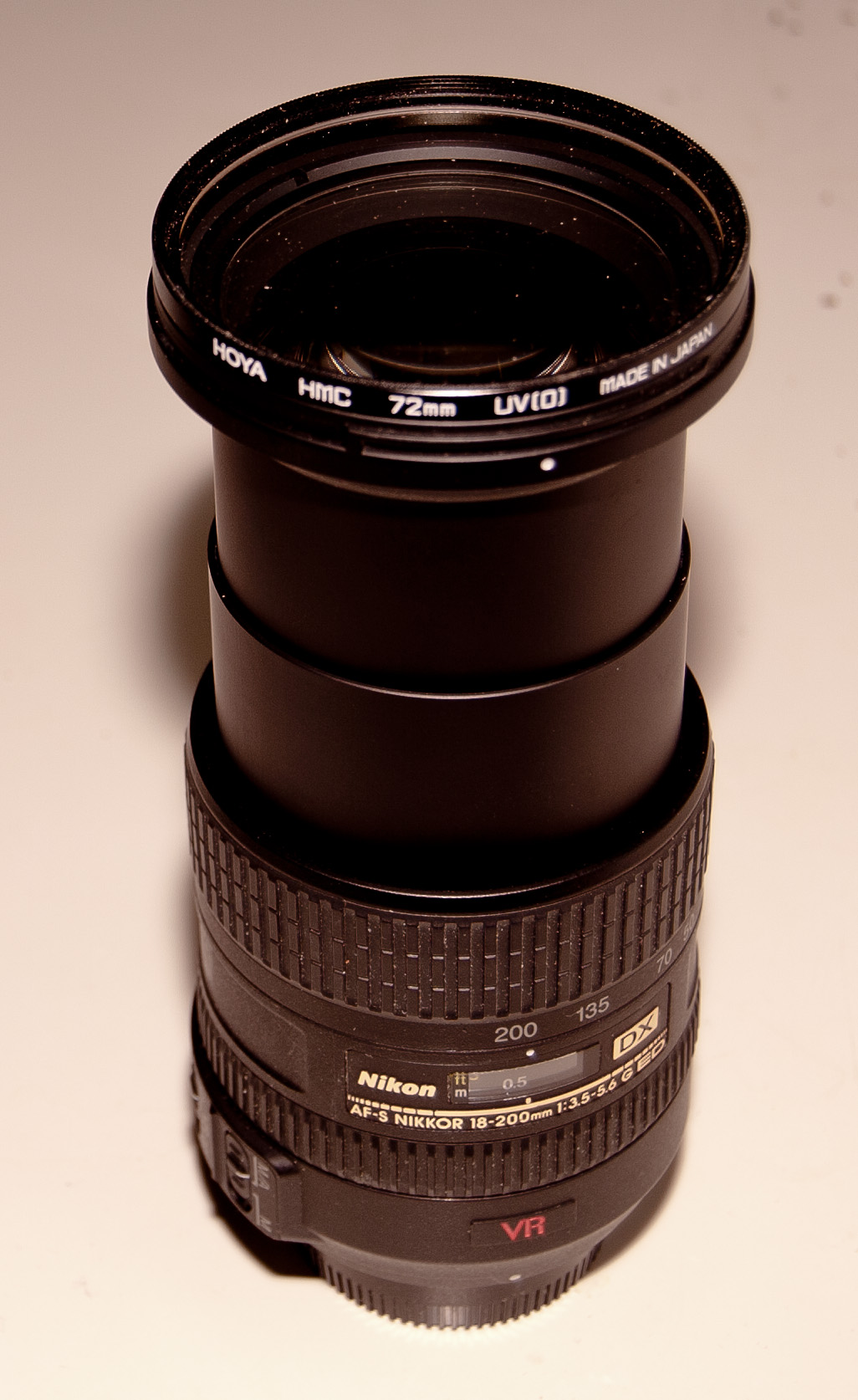
The first generation of 18-200 had some issues with zoom creep when the lens was facing down

Reviewers have praised the lens for its 11.1x focal length range, effective vibration reduction, excellent autofocus motor and its versatility. However, the lens has been criticised for pronounced and complex distortion across the range, extreme softness at certain focal lengths and zoom creep. Overall, it has garnered generally positive reviews, citing the lens' flexibility and ability to "allow the photographer to travel light and never miss a shot while changing lenses".

== Problems ==
The lens has problems with auto-focus of near subjects and in wide-angle position of infinity subjects on some older Nikon digital camera bodies. The problem occurs in Nikon D300s also.

The slow auto-focus problem can be solved in new DSLR cameras disabling the light bulb guide that's built in the body camera. Enabling only one point of focus and enabling "continuous engine focus" or "automatic" instead of single servo, may speed up auto-focus greatly to normal again.

== See also ==
- List of Nikon F-mount lenses with integrated autofocus motor
