= Nikon AF DX Fisheye-Nikkor 10.5mm f/2.8G ED =

AF DX Fisheye-Nikkor 10.5mm f/2.8G ED
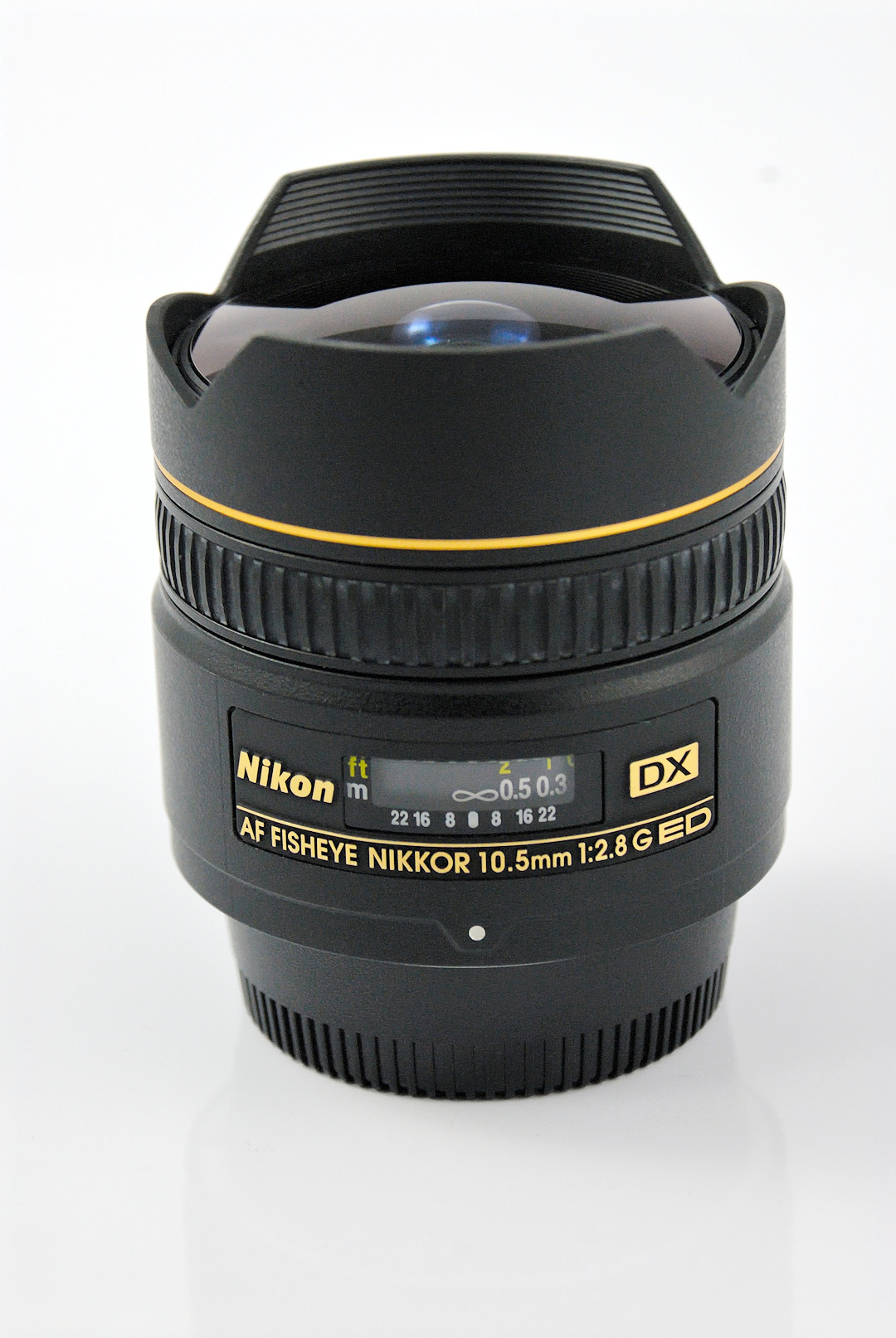
- Maker: Nikon
- Lens mount(s): Nikon F-mount

Technical data
- Type: Prime
- Focus drive: Screw drive
- Focal length: 10.5mm
- Focal length (35mm equiv.): 16mm
- Image format: DX (APS-C)
- Aperture (max/min): f/2.8–22
- Close focus distance: 0.14m
- Max. magnification: 1:5
- Diaphragm blades: 7 (rounded)
- Construction: 10 elements in 7 groups

Features
- Lens-based stabilization: No No
- Macro capable: No No
- Aperture ring: No No
- Application: Fisheye

Physical
- Max. length: 62.5mm
- Diameter: 63mm
- Weight: 305g
- Filter diameter: Rear gelatin type

Accessories
- Lens hood: Built-in
- Case: CL-00715

Angle of view
- Diagonal: 180° (with DX format)

History
- Introduction: 2003

The AF DX Fisheye-Nikkor 10.5mm f/2.8G ED is a fisheye lens manufactured by Nikon for use on Nikon DX format digital SLR cameras. It provides a full 180-degree angle of view on a DX format camera.

== Introduction ==
Nikon announced the lens on 22 July 2003. It was the first prime lens released by Nikon specifically designed for Nikon DX format DSLR cameras. The lens produces a distinctive rectangular fisheye image, which fills the DX format frame (as opposed to a circular fisheye lens which produces a circular image). The lens does not support autofocus on the D40, D40X, D60, D3000, and D5000 as it does not have a built-in focus motor.

== Features ==
- 10.5mm focal length (approximately equivalent to a 16mm lens used on a 135 film format camera).
- Nikon F-mount lens exclusively for use with Nikon DX format DSLRs.
- Full 180-degree angle of view.
- Rectangular fisheye image.

== Construction ==
- 10 elements in 7 groups.
- 1 ED (extra low dispersion) glass element.
- Built-in hood.
- Rear gelatin filter (no front filter thread).
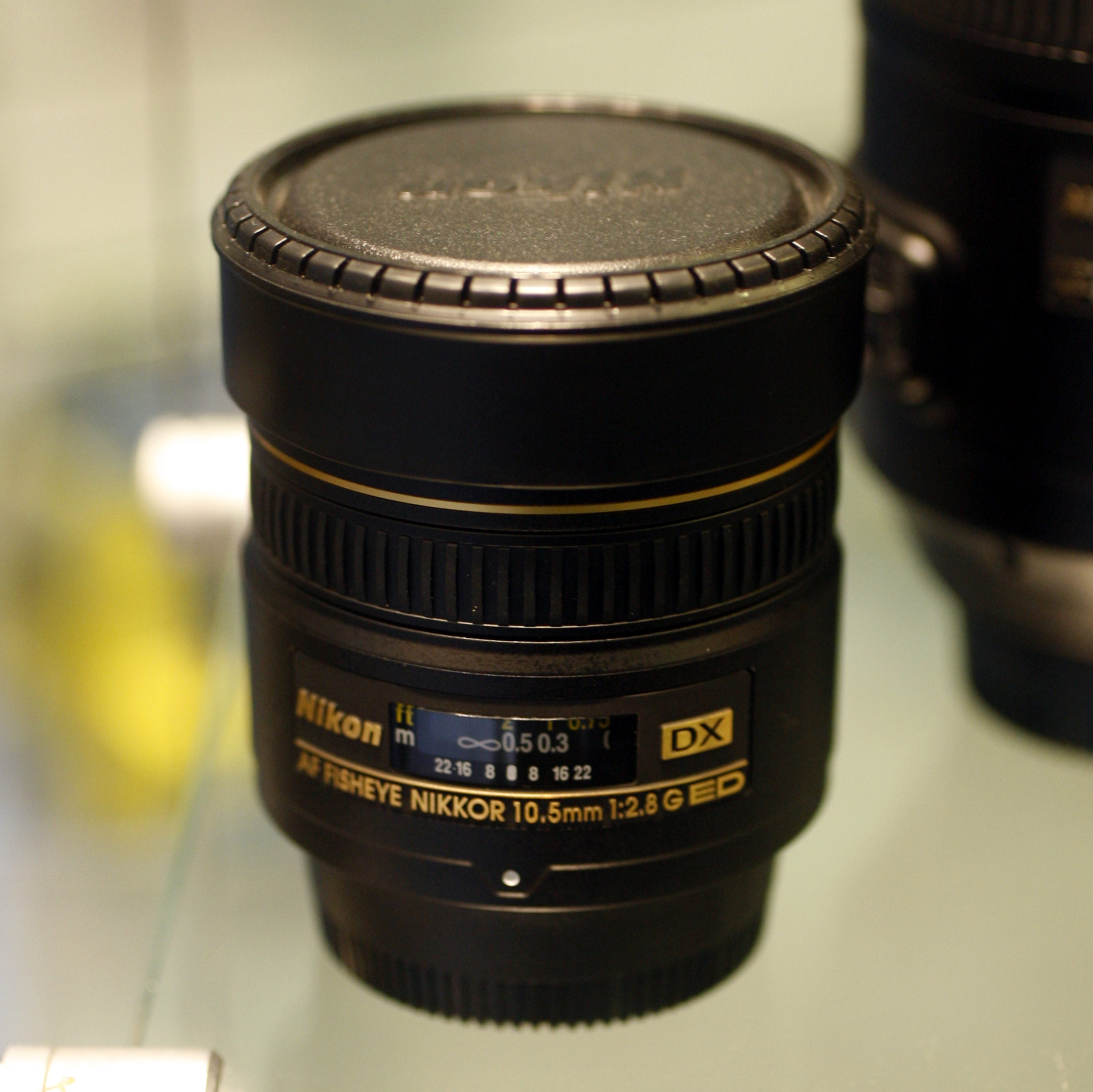
With the slip-on cap attached

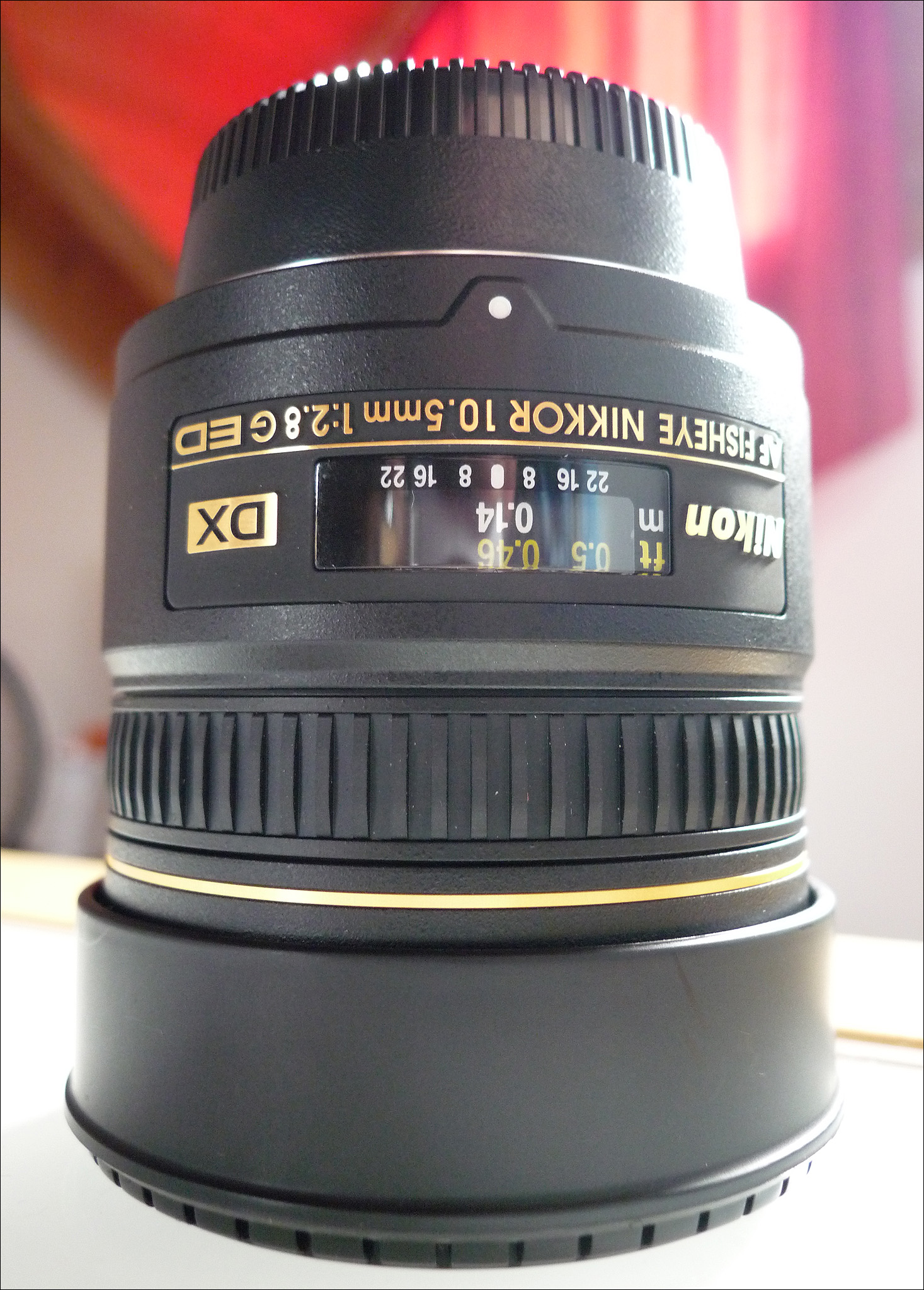
With the slip-on cap attached

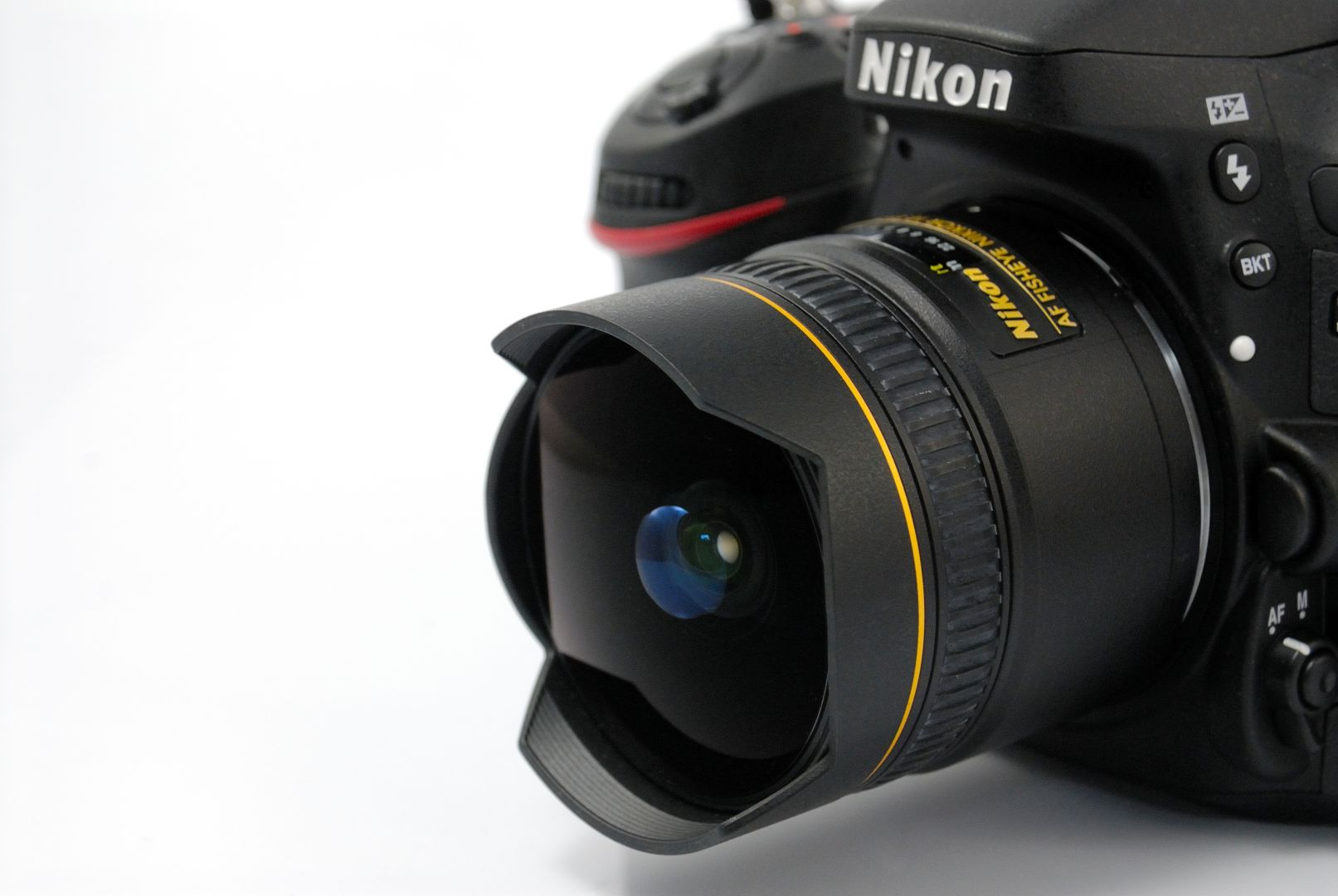
Mounted on a Nikon D7100

== Sample images ==
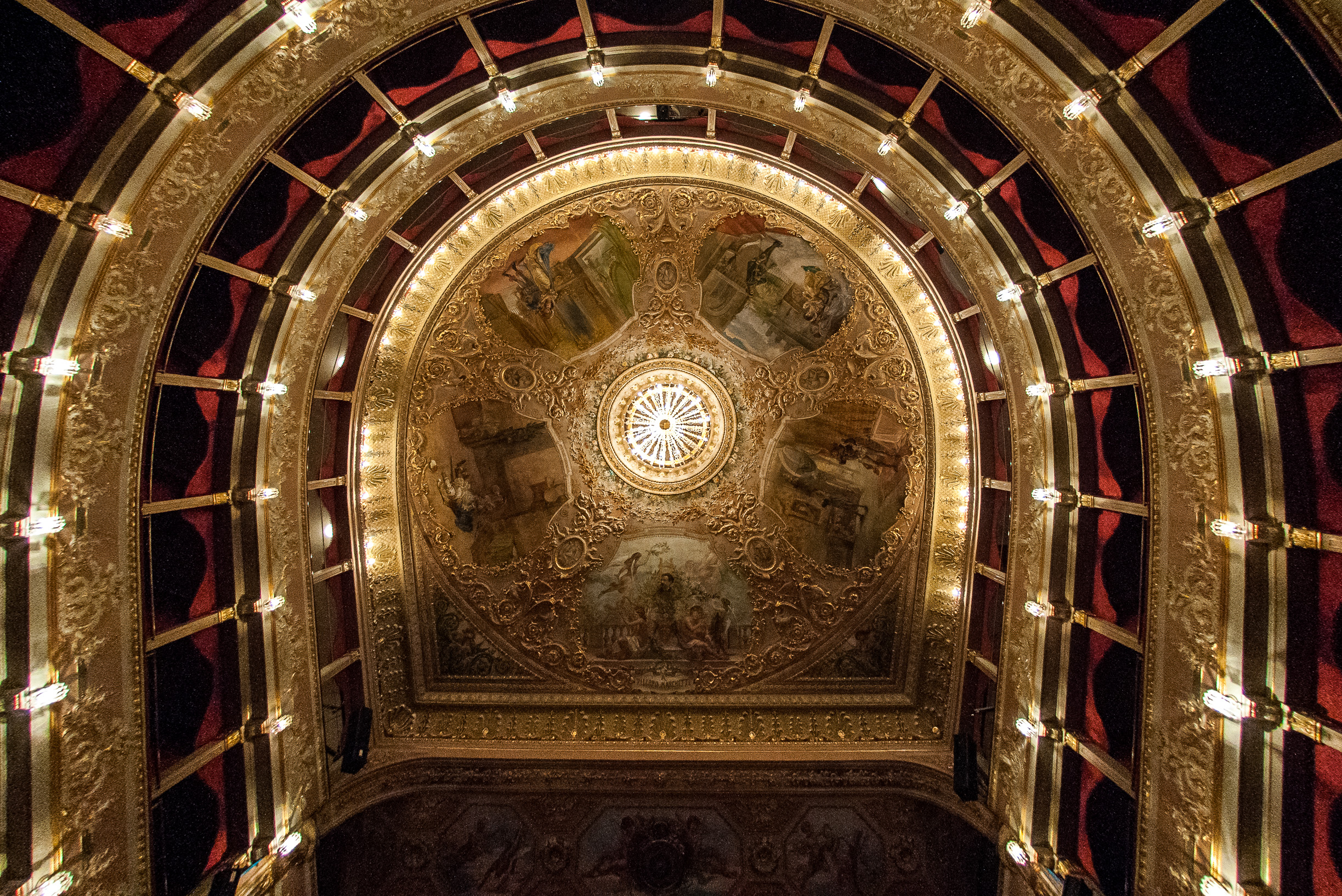
At f/2.8

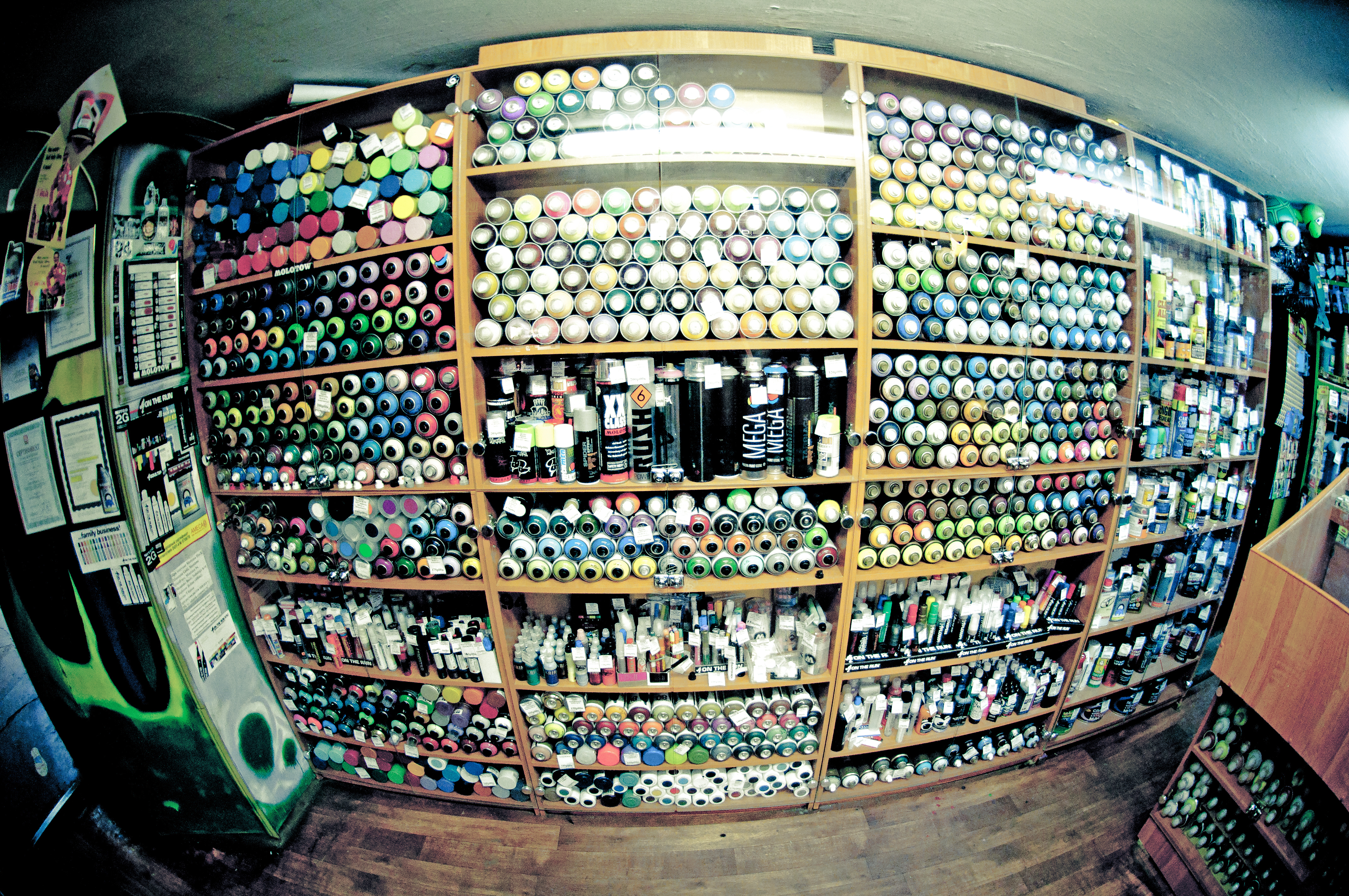
At f/2.8

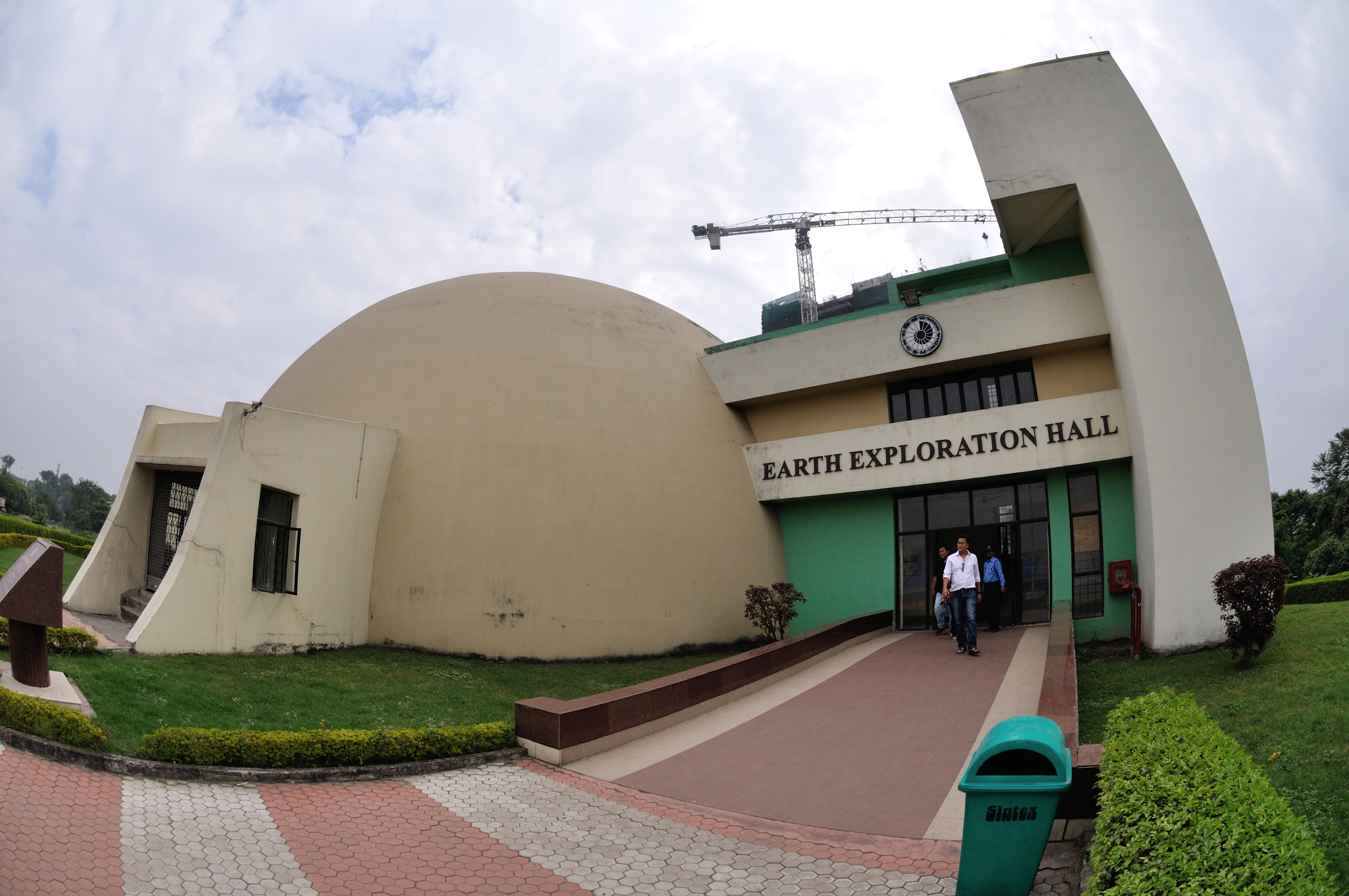
At f/7.1

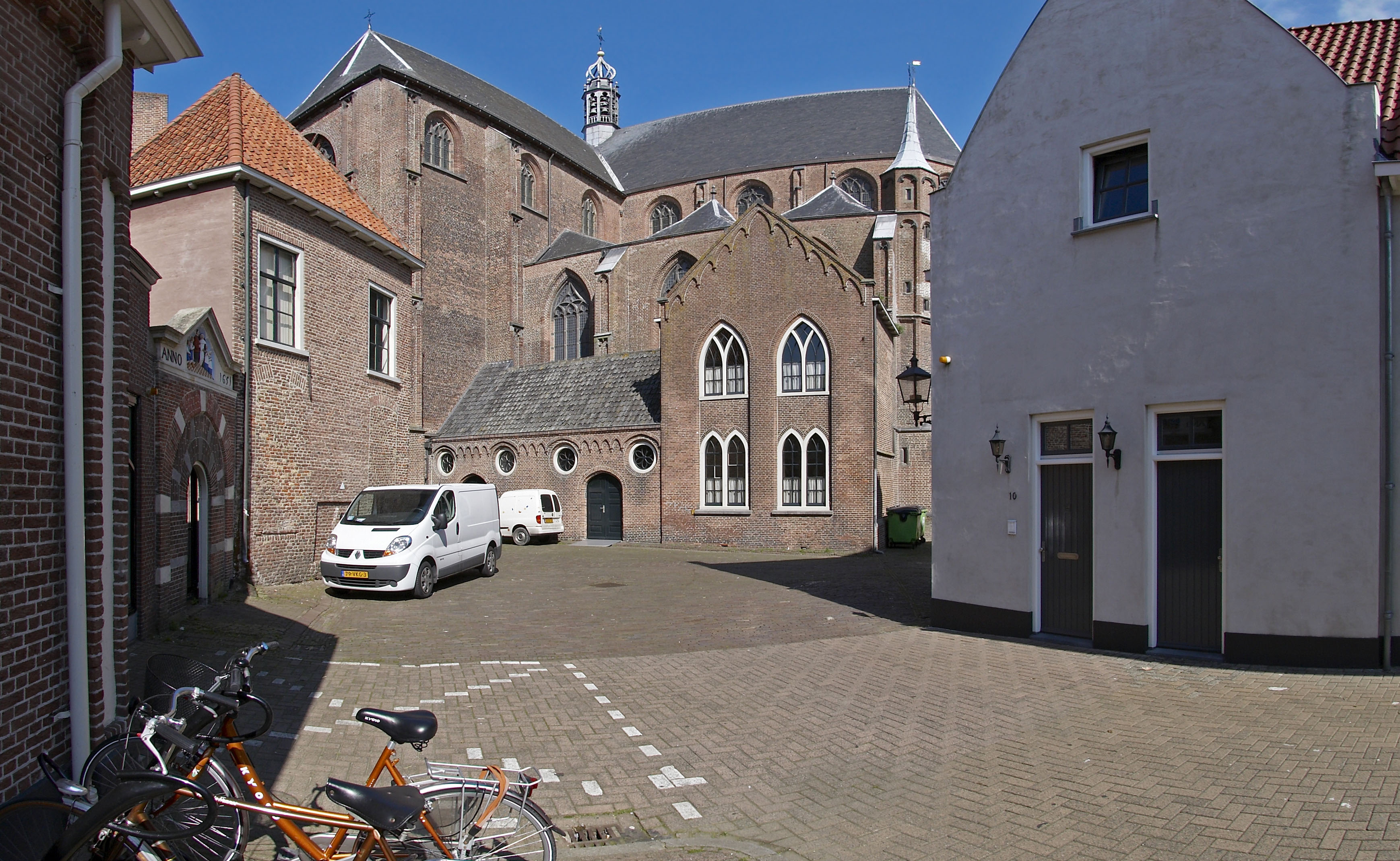
At f/8

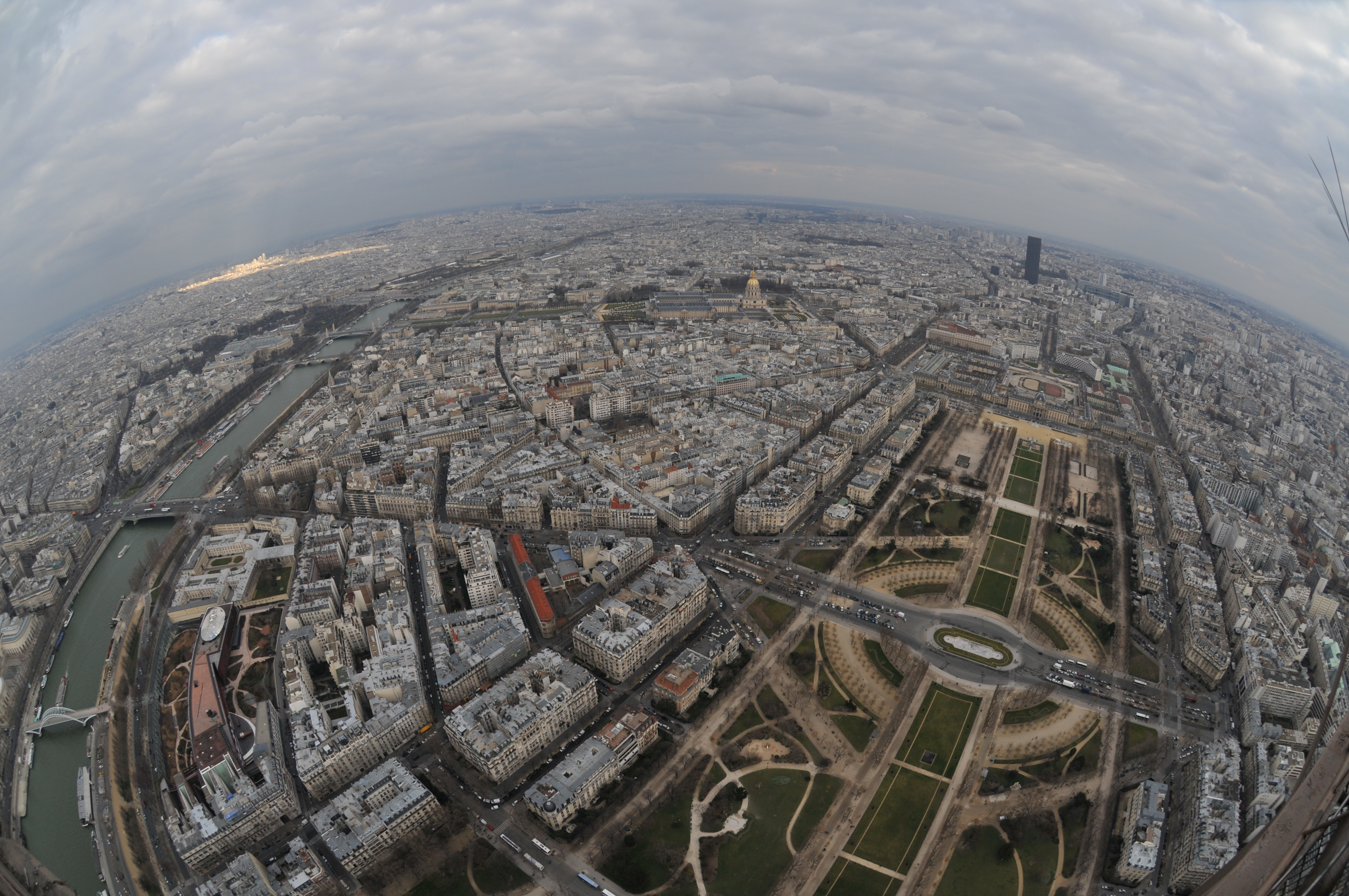
At f/9

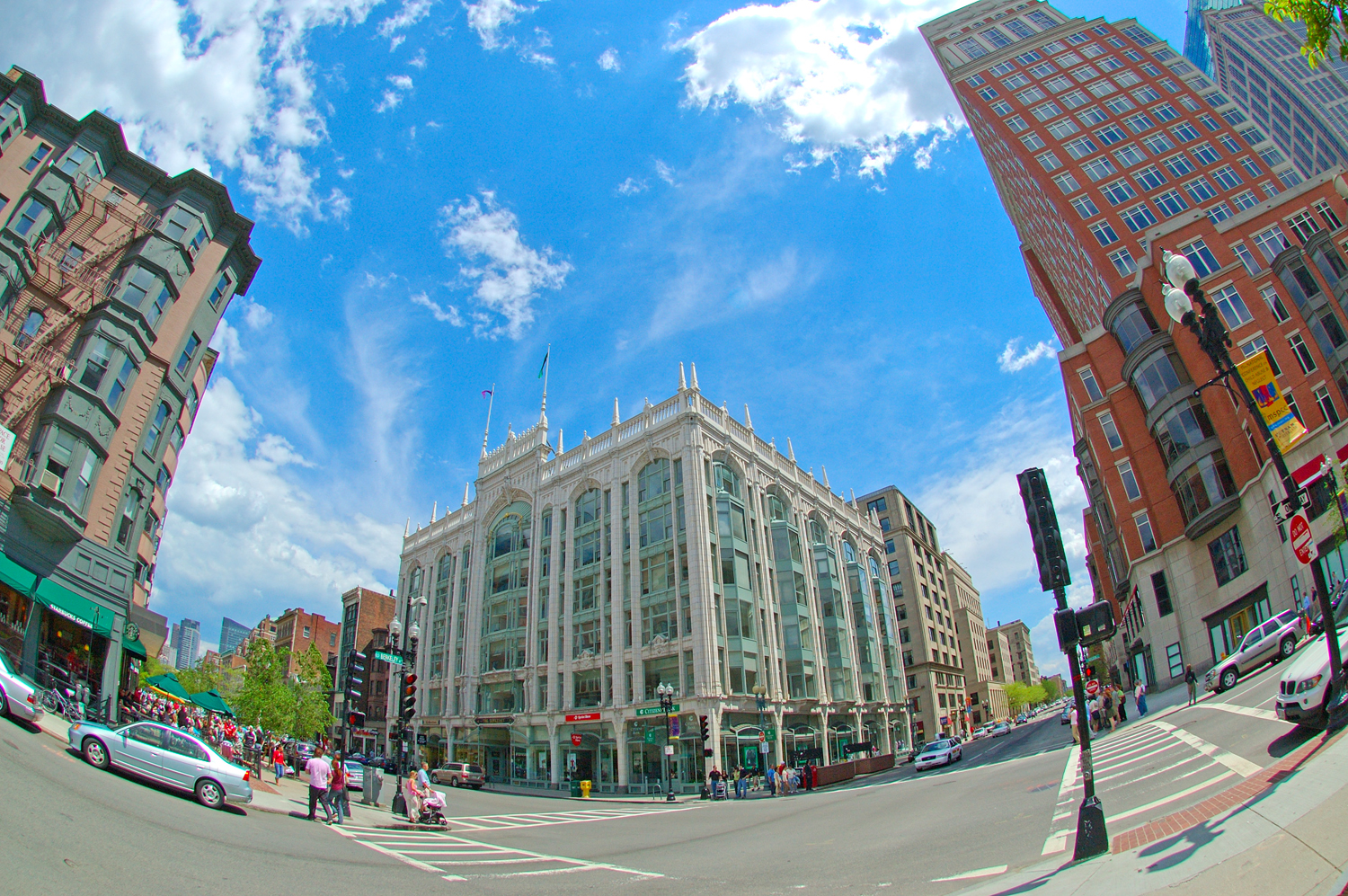
At f/11
