= Nikon AF-S DX Nikkor 55-300mm f/4.5-5.6G ED VR =

Telephoto lens

AF-S DX Nikkor 55-300mm f/4.5–5.6G ED VR
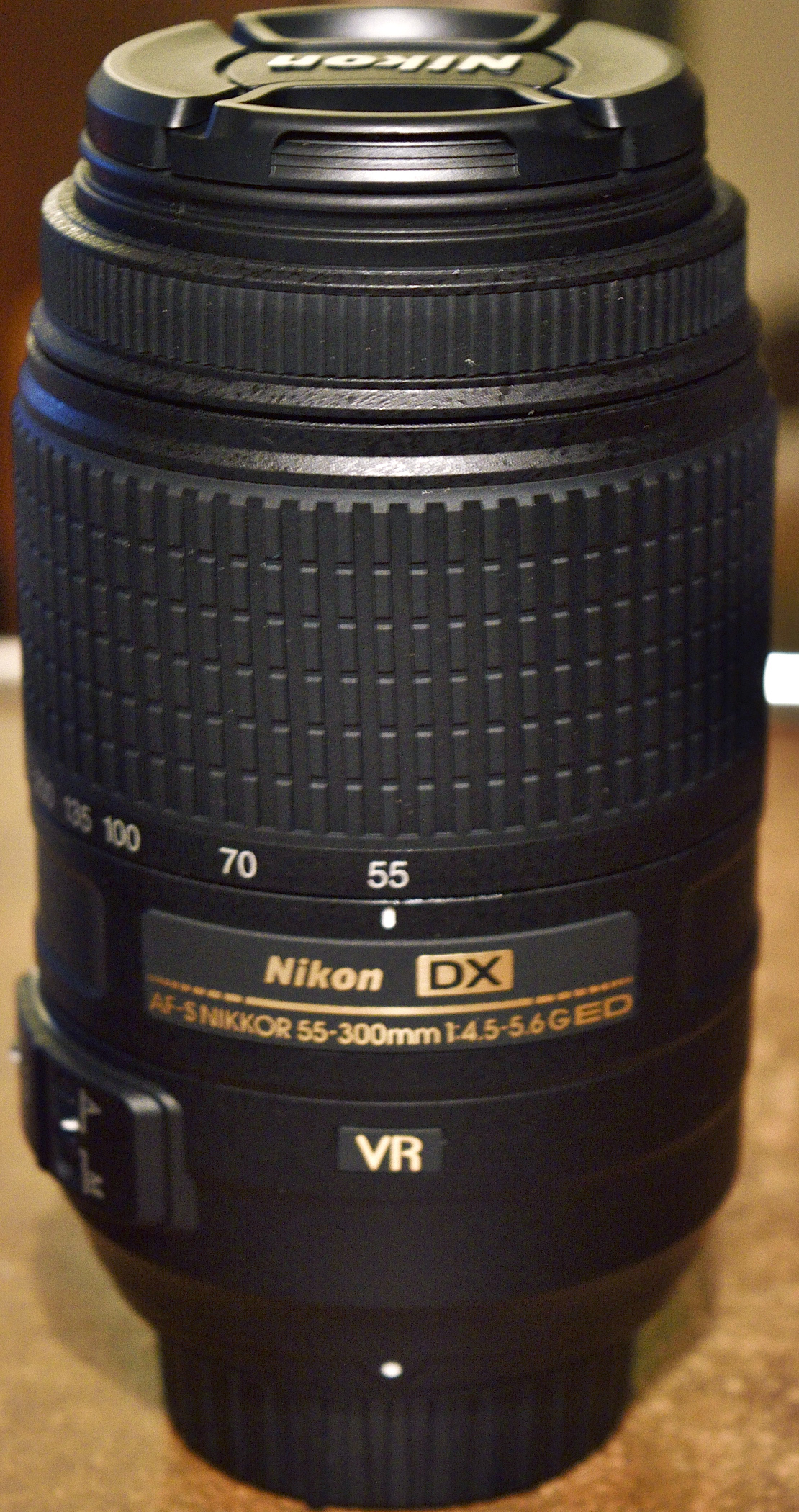
- Lens retracted.
- Maker: Nikon
- Lens mount: F-mount

Technical data
- Type: Zoom
- Focal length: 55 - 300 mm
- Focal length (35mm equiv.): 77.5 - 450 mm
- Crop factor: 1.5
- Aperture (max/min): f/4.5–22 (wide) f/5.6–29 (tele)
- Close focus distance: 1.4 m/4.6 ft.
- Max. magnification: 1:5.5
- Diaphragm blades: 9 (rounded)
- Construction: 17 elements in 11 groups

Features
- Short back focus: No No
- Ultrasonic motor: Yes Yes
- Lens-based stabilization: Yes Yes
- Macro capable: No No
- Unique features: 2 Extra-low Dispersion glass elements Super Integrated Coating; High Refractive Index lens element
- Application: Standard (DX relative); Telephoto superzoom (DX relative)

Physical
- Min. length: 123 mm/4.8 in.
- Diameter: 76.5 mm/3.0 in.
- Weight: 550 g/18.7 oz.
- Filter diameter: 58 mm screw-on

Accessories
- Lens hood: HB-57 (snap-on) (supplied with lens)
- Case: CL-1020 (supplied with lens)

Angle of view
- Diagonal: 28˚50' - 5˚20'

History
- Introduction: September 2, 2010

Retail info
- MSRP: 399 USD

The 55-300mm f/4.5–5.6G AF-S lens is a telephoto superzoom lens manufactured by Nikon for its line of DX DSLR cameras.

As with other DX format lenses, the smaller image circle makes it compatible only with APS-C-sized image sensors. If used on a 35mm film SLR, vignetting will occur; however, it can be used on an FX camera because it will automatically enter "DX Crop Mode", which will eliminate vignetting, but also reduce the image area of an FX sensor to a DX sensor.

The lens was designed to be a significant upgrade to the 55-200mm VR, released in 2007, by adding 100mm of focal length and using VR II (vibration reduction). The lens was also designed to be a companion to the 18-55mm VR lens and is also Nikon's most affordable lens with a maximum 300mm focal length.

== Features ==
The lens is equipped with Nikon's Silent Wave Motor (SWM) to operate the autofocus drive quickly and quietly (which denotes the "AF-S" on the lens body).

The lens uses Nikon's second-generation Vibration Reduction (VR II) technology for image stabilization (which denotes the "VR" on the lens body).

It also has two lens elements made of Nikon's Extra-Low Dispersion Glass (ED) (which denotes the "ED" on the lens body) to remove any chromatic aberrations that occur.

All of the optical elements are coated in Nikon's multiple layer Super Integrated Coating (SIC) for scratch, smudge, and dirt resistance.

Nikon designed it with a High Refractive Index (HRI) lens element to reduce its size and maintain optimal contrast across its entire zoom range.

== Specifications ==
Maximum reproduction ratio	0.28x
Rangefinder	Yes (shown in camera viewfinder and display only)
Lens type	G
Formats	DX; FX in "DX Crop Mode"
Focus	Automatic; Manual

== Gallery ==
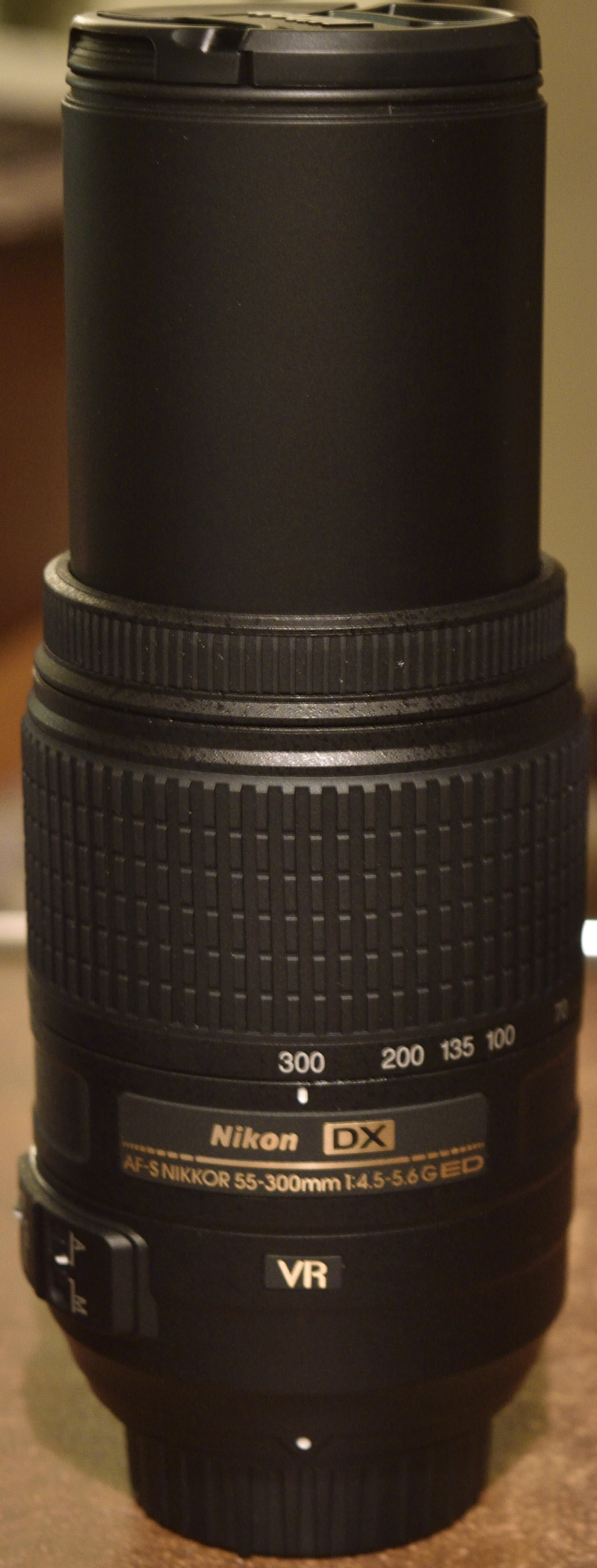
Lens at full zoom.
