= Nikon AF-S DX Zoom-Nikkor 12-24mm f/4G IF-ED =

Camera lens

AF-S DX Zoom-Nikkor 12-24mm f/4G IF-ED
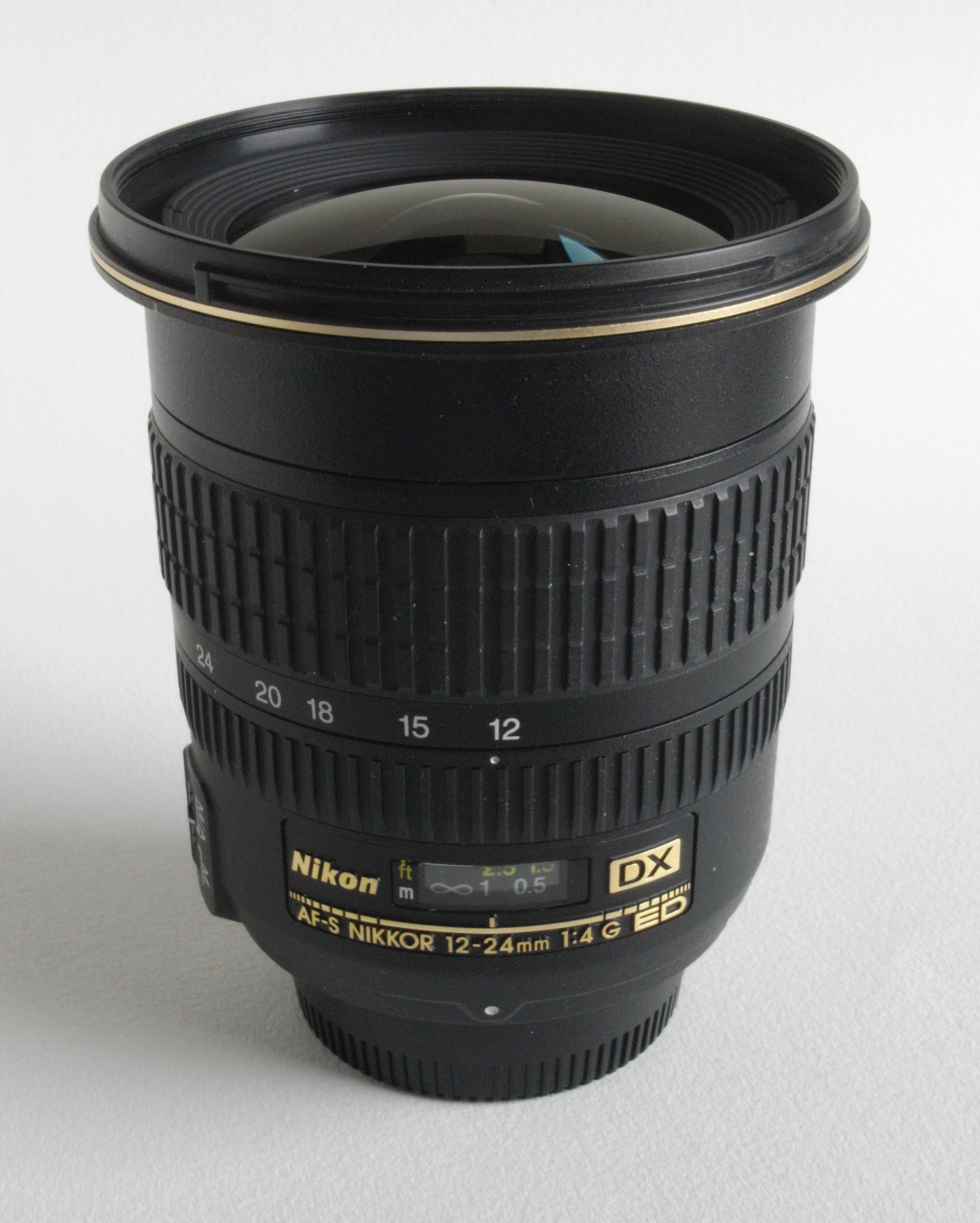
- Maker: Nikon
- Lens mount(s): F-mount

Technical data
- Type: Zoom
- Focus drive: Silent wave motor
- Focal length: 12-24mm
- Focal length (35mm equiv.): 18-36mm
- Image format: DX (APS-C)
- Aperture (max/min): f/4–22
- Close focus distance: 0.30m
- Max. magnification: 1:8.3
- Diaphragm blades: 7 (rounded)
- Construction: 11 elements in 7 groups

Features
- Lens-based stabilization: No No
- Macro capable: No No
- Aperture ring: No No
- Application: Wide-angle zoom

Physical
- Max. length: 82.5 mm
- Diameter: 90mm
- Weight: 465g
- Filter diameter: 77mm

Accessories
- Lens hood: HB-23
- Case: CL-S2

Angle of view
- Diagonal: 99°-61° (with DX format)

History
- Introduction: 2003

The AF-S DX Zoom-Nikkor 12-24mm f/4G is a lens manufactured by Nikon for use on Nikon DX format digital SLR cameras. It provides an angle of view on a DX format camera similar to that of an 18-35mm lens on a 135 film format camera.

== Introduction ==
Nikon announced the lens on 18 February 2003 as the first lens specifically designed for the Nikon DX format.

This lens was replaced by the AF-S DX NIKKOR 10-24mm f/3.5–4.5G ED announced on April 14, 2009.

== Target market ==
At the time the lens was introduced, Nikon did not make a zoom lens which would provide an ultra-wide-angle view on a DX format camera. Due to the crop factor of the DX format, wide-angle zoom lenses such as the 18-35mm provided an angle of view equivalent to a 27-52.5mm lens; more typical of a normal zoom.

The purpose of the 12-24mm was to fill this gap in the ultra-wide- to wide-angle range that would otherwise require users to purchase relatively expensive prime lenses such as the 13mm, 15mm and 18mm Nikkors.

== Features ==
- 12-24mm focal length (approximately equivalent to an 18-35mm lens used on a 135 film format camera)
- Compact silent-wave autofocus motor with full-time manual override
- Nikon F-mount lens exclusively for use with Nikon DX format DSLRs
- Extra-low Dispersion (ED) glass elements to reduce chromatic aberration
- Aspherical elements to reduce distortion
- Super integrated coating (SIC) to reduce flare and ghosts
- Internal focusing (IF)

== Construction ==
- eleven lens elements in seven groups
- three aspherical elements
- two ED glass elements
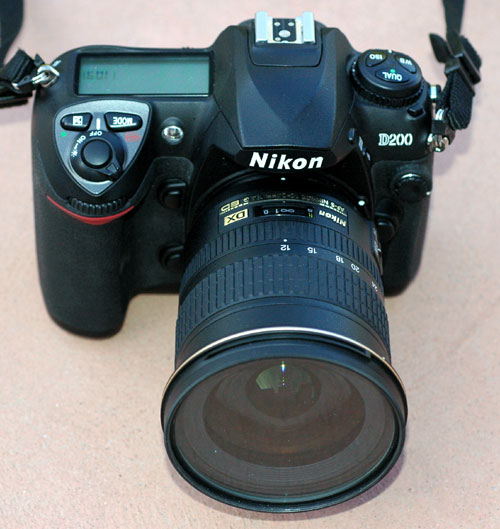
Mounted on a Nikon D200

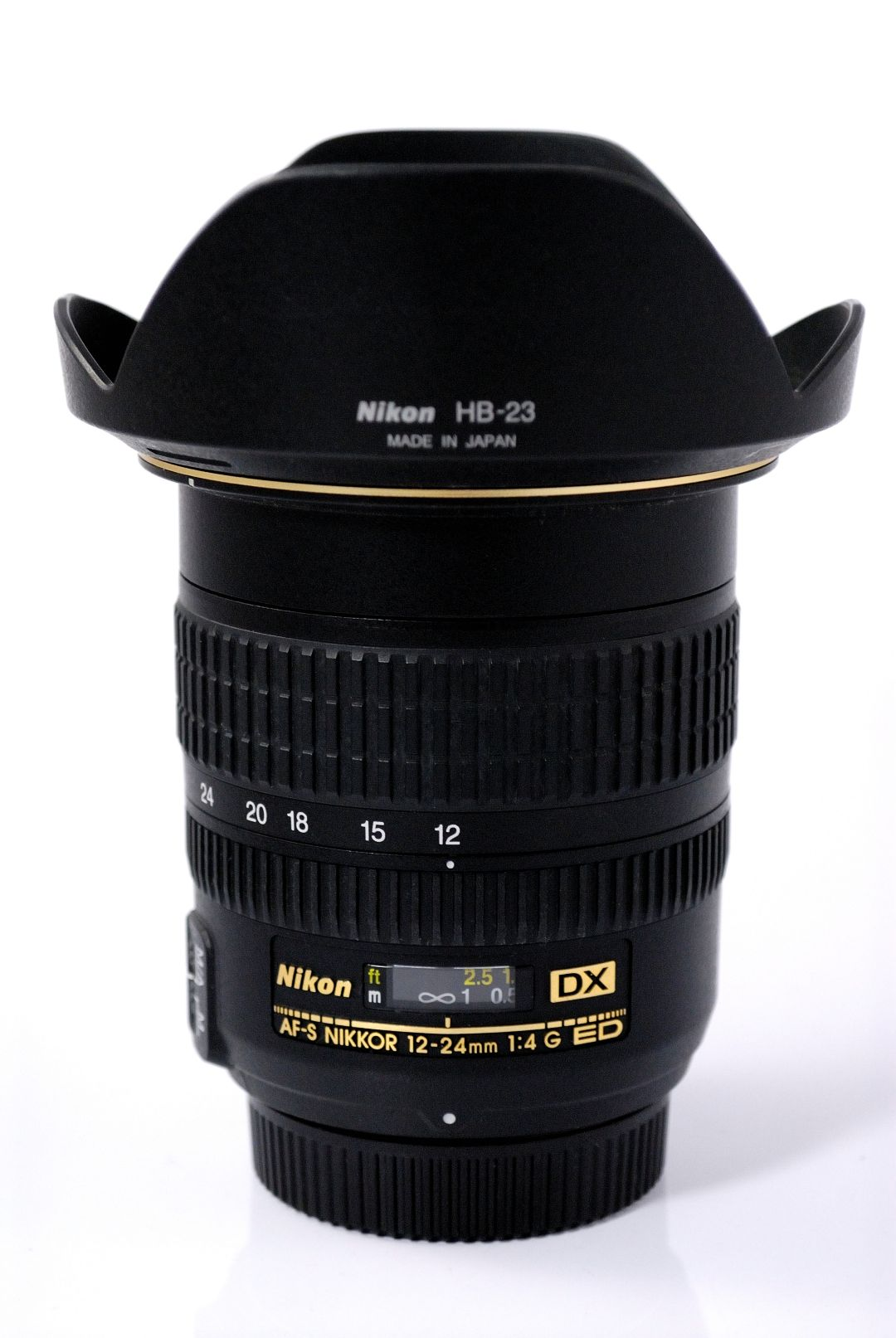

== See also ==
- List of Nikon compatible lenses with integrated autofocus-motor
