= Nikon DX format =

APS-C image sensor format

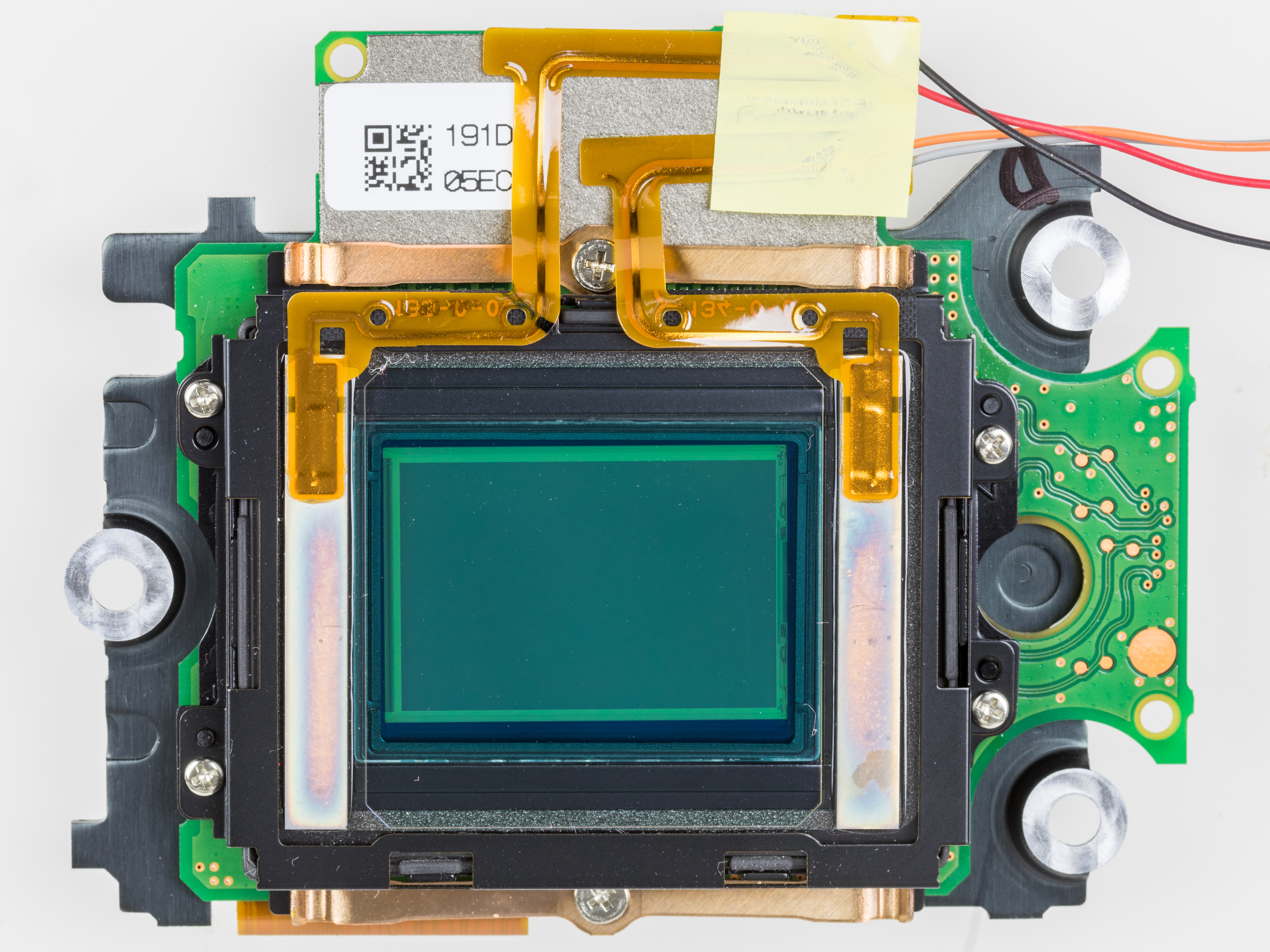
CMOS image sensor of the Nikon D90

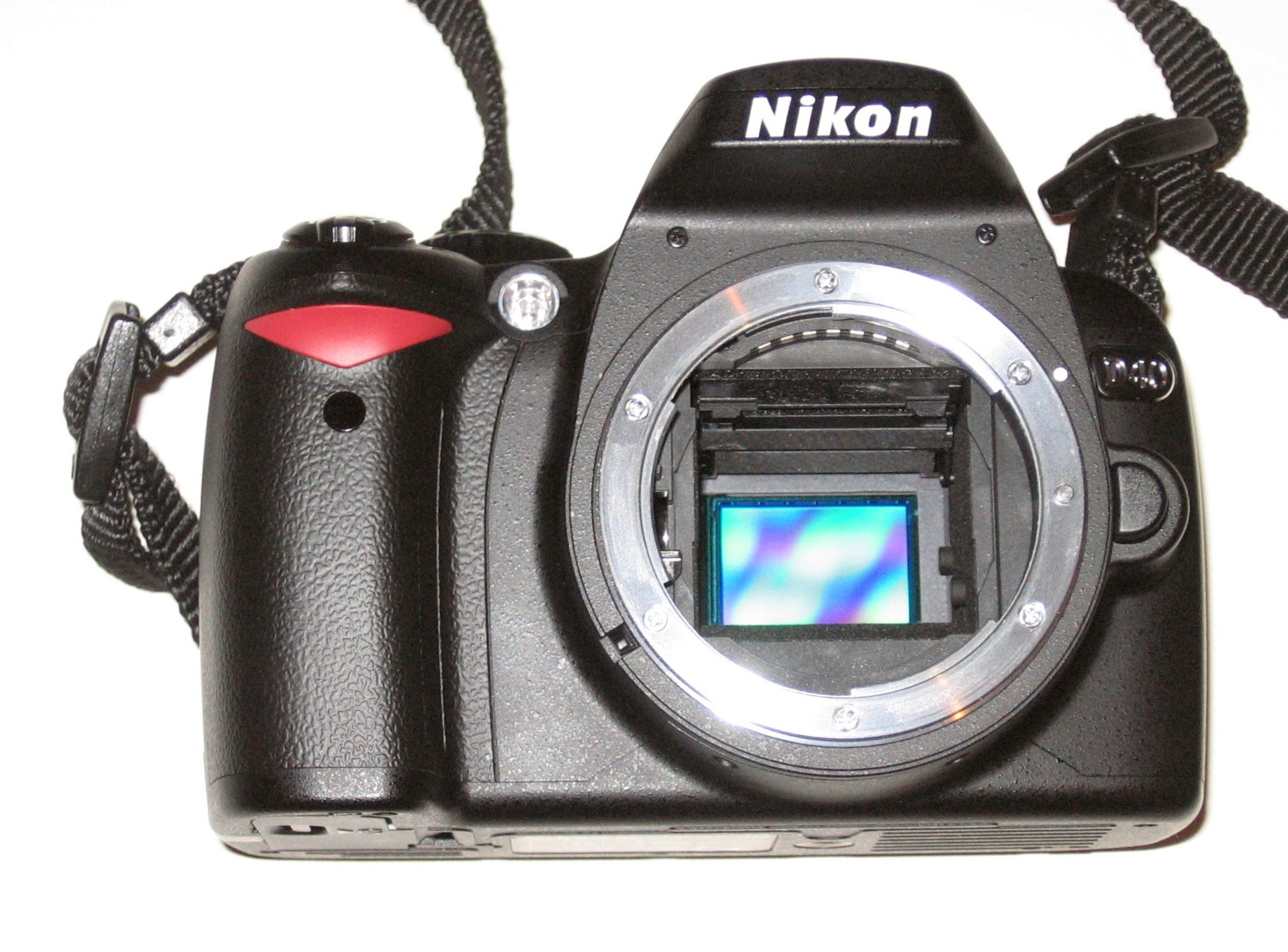
The Nikon D40 is a DX-format camera. Here, the DX-sized image sensor is exposed.

Comparison of image sensor sizes, including Nikon DX.

The Nikon DX format is an alternative name used by Nikon corporation for APS-C image sensor format being approximately 24x16 mm. Its dimensions are about 2/3 (29 mm vs 43 mm diagonal, approx.) those of the 35mm format. The format was created by Nikon for its digital SLR cameras, many of which are equipped with DX-sized sensors. DX format is very similar in size to sensors from Pentax, Sony and other camera manufacturers. All are referred to as APS-C, including the Canon cameras with a slightly smaller sensor.

Nikon has produced 23 F-mount lenses for the DX format, from macro to telephoto lenses. 35mm format lenses can also be used with DX format cameras, with additional advantages: less vignetting, less distortion and often better border sharpness. Disadvantages of 35mm lenses include generally higher weight and incompatible features such as autofocus with some lower-end DX cameras. Nikon has also produced digital SLRs that feature the larger Nikon FX format sensor that is the size of the 135 film format.

In 2013, Nikon introduced a high-end compact camera with a DX-sized sensor, the Nikon Coolpix A, featuring an 18.5 mm lens.

In late 2019 Nikon announced their first Z-mount camera with an APS-C sensor, the Nikon Z50. This has been followed by an additional three DX cameras. As of 5 November 2026, Nikon has produced 8 Z-mount lenses for the DX format.

== Implications ==
The 1/3 smaller diagonal size of the DX format amounts to a 1/3 narrower angle of view than would be achieved with the 135 film format (35 mm film or FX format), using a lens of the same focal length. Strictly in angle-of-view terms, the effect is equivalent to increasing focal length by 50% on a 135 film camera, and so is often described as a 1.5x focal length multiplier.

This effect can be advantageous for telephoto and macro photography as it produces a tighter crop without the need to increase actual focal length. However it becomes disadvantageous for wide-angle photography as a wide-angle lens for 135 film effectively becomes a normal lens for the DX format (e.g. 28 mm x 1.5 = 42 mm 135 film equiv.). This has led to the increased development of the DX format-specific lenses for the Nikon F-mount. Since these lenses do not need to cover the 135 film area, they are smaller and lighter than their 135 format counterparts of equal angle-of-view. The production of DX-specific lenses has also enabled the production of affordable wide-angle lenses for the format (e.g., 12 mm), whereas costly ultra-wide-angle lenses from the 135 format were formerly required.

When DX format lenses are used on 135 format cameras, vignetting often occurs, as the image circle does not cover the entire area of the 135 format.

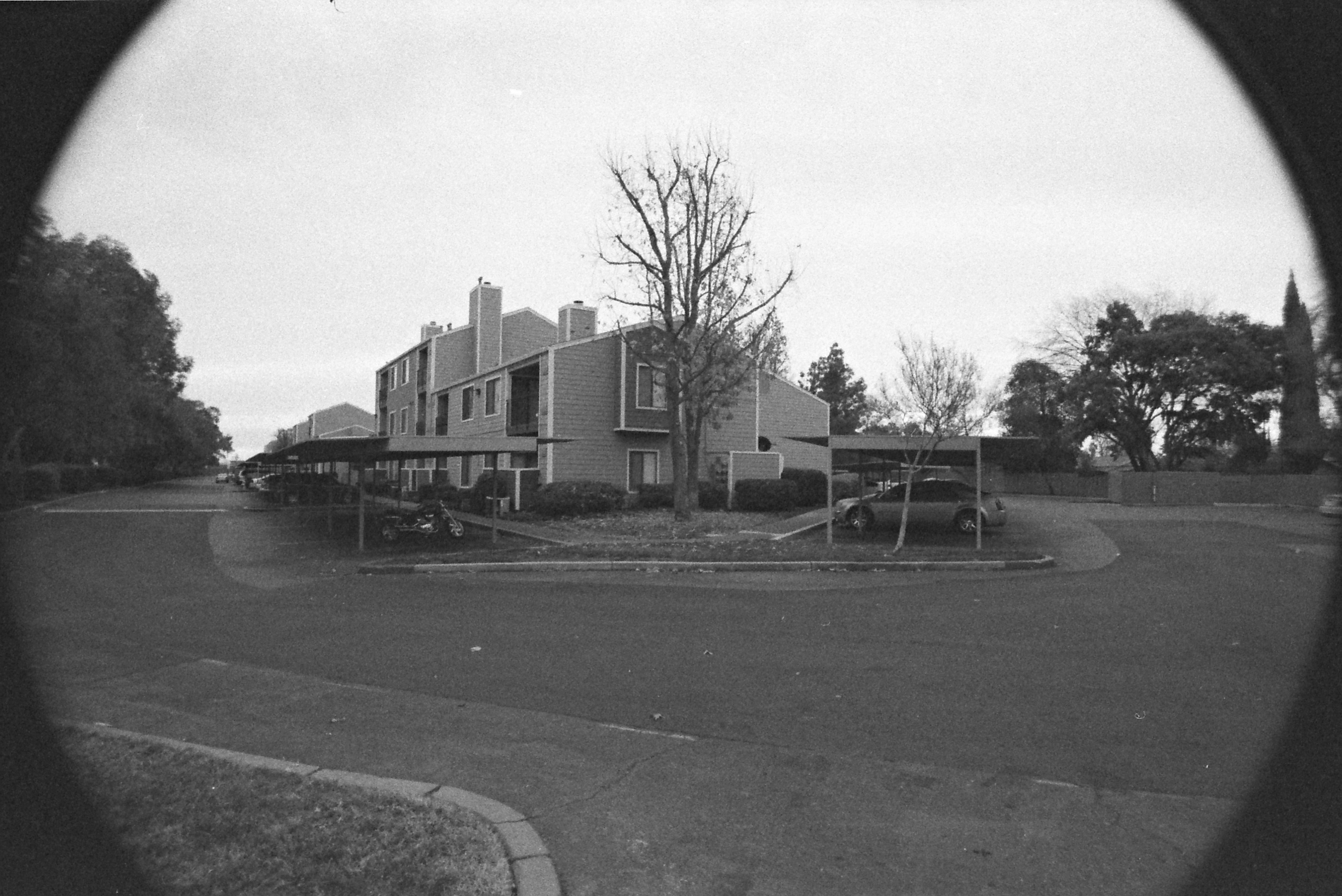
Vignetting produced by using a DX-format lens on a full-sized 35mm frame.

== Active sensor size ==
Nikon uses DX format sensors with slightly different active areas, which is the area where the image is captured, although all of them are classified as APS-C. Image sensors always have additional pixels around the active pixels, called dummy pixels (unmasked, working pixels) and optical black pixels (pixels which are covered by a mask used as a black-level reference). The size differences are minuscule and not noticeable in practice:

Mount	Camera	Active width (mm)	Active height (mm)	Horizontal pixels	Vertical pixels	MP
F	Nikon D1	23.7	15.5	2,012	1,324	2.7
F	Nikon D1H	23.7	15.5	2,012	1,324	2.7
F	Nikon D1X	23.7	15.5	3,008	1,960	5.9
F	Nikon D2H	23.7	15.5	2,464	1,632	4.2
F	Nikon D2Hs	23.7	15.5	2,464	1,632	4.2
F	Nikon D2X	23.7	15.7	4,288	2,848	12.3
F	Nikon D2Xs	23.7	15.7	4,288	2,848	12.3
F	Nikon D40	23.7	15.5	3,008	2,000	6.0
F	Nikon D40x	23.7	15.6	3,872	2,592	10.1
F	Nikon D50	23.7	15.5	3,008	2,000	6.0
F	Nikon D60	23.6	15.8	3,872	2,592	10.1
F	Nikon D70	23.7	15.5	3,008	2,000	6.0
F	Nikon D70s	23.7	15.5	3,008	2,000	6.0
F	Nikon D80	23.6	15.8	3,872	2,592	10.1
F	Nikon D90	23.6	15.8	4,288	2,848	12.3
F	Nikon D100	23.7	15.5	3,008	2,000	6.1
F	Nikon D200	23.6	15.8	3,872	2,592	10.1
F	Nikon D300	23.6	15.8	4,288	2,848	12.3
F	Nikon D300S	23.6	15.8	4,288	2,848	12.3
F	Nikon D500	23.5	15.7	5,568	3,712	20.9
F	Nikon D3000	23.6	15.8	3,872	2,592	10.1
F	Nikon D3100	23.1	15.4	4,608	3,072	14.2
F	Nikon D3200	23.2	15.4	6,016	4,000	24.0
F	Nikon D3300	23.5	15.6	6,000	4,000	24.0
F	Nikon D3400	23.5	15.6	6,000	4,000	24.0
F	Nikon D3500	23.5	15.6	6,000	4,000	24.0
F	Nikon D5000	23.6	15.8	4,288	2,848	12.3
F	Nikon D5100	23.6	15.6	4,928	3,264	16.2
F	Nikon D5200	23.5	15.6	6,000	4,000	24.0
F	Nikon D5300	23.5	15.6	6,000	4,000	24.0
F	Nikon D5500	23.5	15.6	6,000	4,000	24.0
F	Nikon D5600	23.5	15.6	6,000	4,000	24.0
F	Nikon D7000	23.6	15.6	4,928	3,264	16.2
F	Nikon D7100	23.5	15.6	6,000	4,000	24.1
F	Nikon D7200	23.5	15.6	6,000	4,000	24.2
F	Nikon D7500	23.5	15.7	5,568	3,712	20.9
(Note: Coolpix A is a fixed-lens, compact camera.)	Nikon Coolpix A	23.6	15.7	4,928	3,264	16.2
Z	Nikon Z30	23.5	15.7	5,568	3,712	20.9
Z	Nikon Z50	23.5	15.7	5,568	3,712	20.9
Z	Nikon Z50II	23.5	15.7	5,568	3,712	20.9
Z	Nikon Zfc	23.5	15.7	5,568	3,712	20.9

== Lenses ==
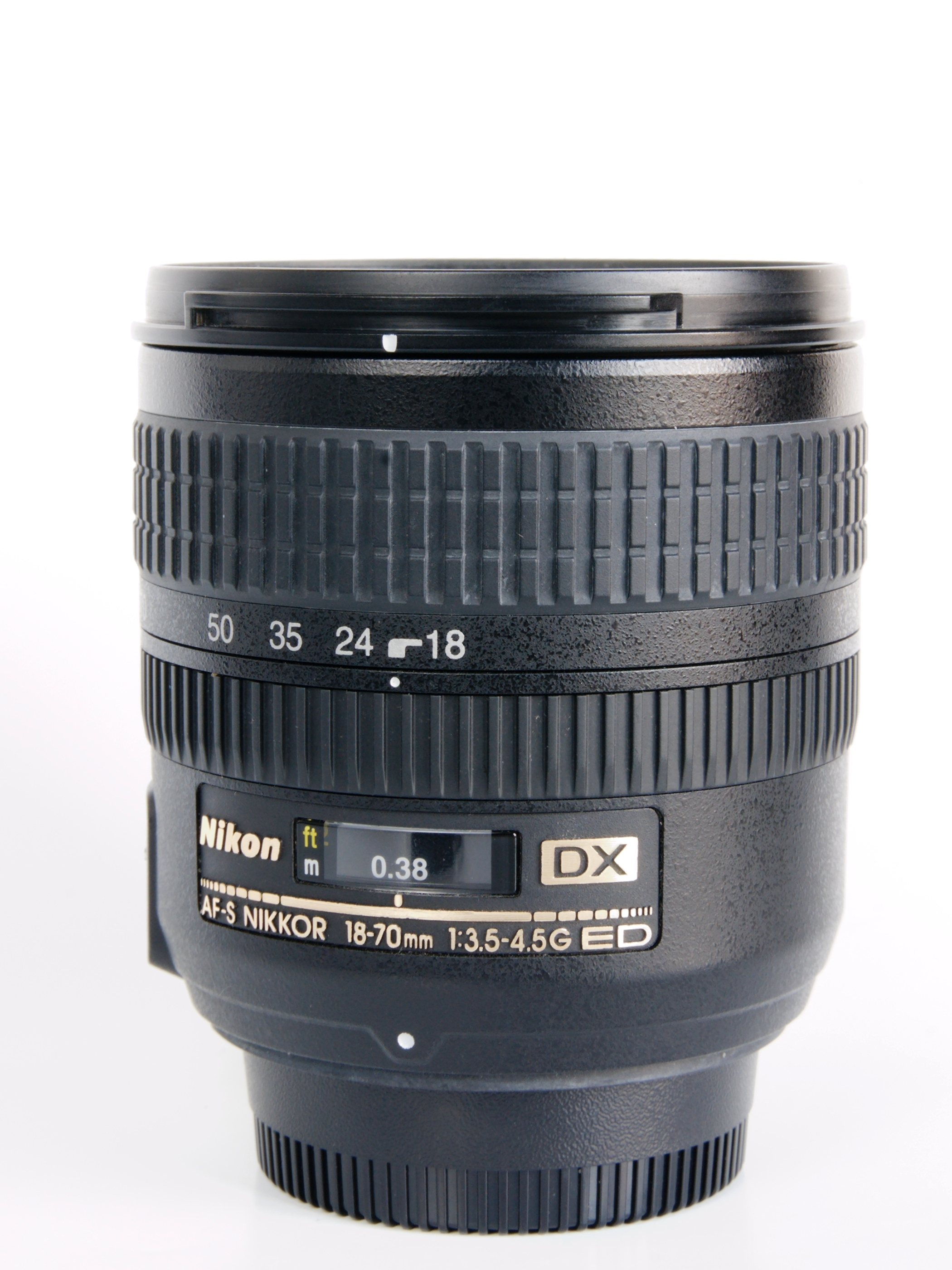
Nikkor DX lenses are marked with the DX logo.

=== F-mount Lenses for Nikon DX format ===
- 10.5mm f/2.8G ED AF DX Fisheye
- 35mm f/1.8G AF-S DX
- 40mm f/2.8G DX Micro-Nikkor
- 10-24mm f/3.5-4.5G ED AF-S DX
- 12-24mm f/4G ED-IF AF-S DX
- 16-85mm f/3.5-5.6G ED-IF AF-S DX
- 17-55mm f/2.8G ED-IF AF-S DX
- 18-55mm f/3.5-5.6G ED AF-S DX
- 18-55mm f/3.5-5.6G ED AF-S II DX
- 18-55mm f/3.5-5.6G AF-P DX
- 18-70mm f/3.5-4.5G ED-IF AF-S DX
- 18-135mm f/3.5-5.6G ED-IF AF-S DX
- 55-200mm f/4-5.6G ED AF-S DX
- 55-300mm f/4.5-5.6G ED AF-S DX
- 70-300mm f/4.5-6.3G ED AF-P DX

=== Current F-mount Vibration Reduction (VR) lenses in DX format ===
- AF-P DX NIKKOR 10-20mm f/4.5-5.6G VR
- AF-S DX NIKKOR 16-80mm f/2.8-4E ED VR
- AF-S DX NIKKOR 16-85mm f/3.5-5.6G ED VR
- AF-S DX NIKKOR 18-55mm f/3.5-5.6G VR
- AF-S DX NIKKOR 18-55mm f/3.5-5.6G VR II
- AF-P DX NIKKOR 18-55mm f/3.5-5.6G VR
- AF-S DX NIKKOR 18-140mm f/3.5-5.6G ED VR
- AF-S DX NIKKOR 18-105mm f/3.5-5.6G ED VR
- AF-S DX NIKKOR 18-200mm f/3.5-5.6G ED VR II
- AF-S DX NIKKOR 18-300mm f/3.5-5.6G ED VR
- AF-S DX NIKKOR 18-300mm f/3.5-6.3G ED VR
- AF-S DX NIKKOR 55-200mm f/4-5.6G ED-IF VR
- AF-S DX NIKKOR 55-200mm f/4-5.6G ED VR II
- AF-S DX NIKKOR 55-300mm f/4-5.6G ED VR
- AF-S DX NIKKOR 55-300mm f/4.5-5.6G ED VR
- AF-P DX NIKKOR 70-300mm f/4.5-6.3G ED VR
- AF-S DX Micro NIKKOR 85mm f/3.5G ED VR

== See also ==
- Image sensor format
  - APS-C
  - Full-frame
- Nikon F-mount
- List of Nikon F-mount lenses with integrated autofocus motors
- Nikon F-mount teleconverter

Sensor	Class	1999	2000	2001	2002	2003	2004	2005	2006	2007	2008	2009	2010	2011	2012	2013	2014	2015	2016	2017	2018	2019	2020	2021	2022	2023	2024	2025	2026
FX (Full-frame)	Flagship											D3X ^{−P}																	
FX (Full-frame)	Flagship										D3 ^{−P}		D3S ^{−P}		D4		D4S		D5^{T}					D6^{T}					
FX (Full-frame)	Professional											D700 ^{−P}			D800/D800E			D810/D810A			D850 ^{AT}								
FX (Full-frame)	Enthusiast																Df												
FX (Full-frame)	Enthusiast																	D750 ^{A}					D780 ^{AT}						
FX (Full-frame)	Enthusiast															D600	D610												
DX (APS-C)	Flagship		D1^{−E}	D1X^{−E}				D2X^{−E}		D2Xs^{−E}																			
DX (APS-C)	Flagship		D1^{−E}	D1H ^{−E}			D2H^{−E}	D2Hs^{−E}																					
DX (APS-C)	Professional				D100^{−E}				D200^{−E}		D300^{−P}		D300S^{−P}						D500 ^{AT}										
DX (APS-C)	Enthusiast						D70^{−E}		D70s^{−E}	D80^{−E}		D90^{−E}		D7000 ^{−P}			D7100	D7200			D7500 ^{AT}								
DX (APS-C)	Upper-entry								D50^{−E}	D40X^{−E*}	D60^{−E*}		D5000^{A−P*}		D5100^{A−P*}	D5200^{A−P*}	D5300^{A*}	D5500^{AT*}		D5600 ^{AT*}									
DX (APS-C)	Entry-level									D40^{−E*}			D3000^{−E*}	D3100^{−P*}		D3200^{−P*}	D3300^{*}			D3400^{*}		D3500^{*}							
Early models		SVC (prototype; 1986); QV-1000C (1988); NASA F4 (1991); E2/E2S (1995); E2N/E2NS (1996); E3/E3S (1998)																											
Sensor	Class																												
Sensor	Class	1999	2000	2001	2002	2003	2004	2005	2006	2007	2008	2009	2010	2011	2012	2013	2014	2015	2016	2017	2018	2019	2020	2021	2022	2023	2024	2025	2026

Sensor	Class	2018	2019	2020	2021	2022	2023	2024	2025	2026
FX (Full-frame)	Flagship					^{8K} Z9 ^{S}				
FX (Full-frame)	Flagship							^{8K} Z8 ^{S}		
FX (Full-frame)	Professional		^{4K} Z7 ^{S}		^{4K} Z7Ⅱ ^{S}					
FX (Full-frame)	Professional		^{4K} Z6 ^{S}		^{4K} Z6Ⅱ ^{S}				^{6K} Z6Ⅲ ^{S}	
FX (Full-frame)	Cinema									^{6K} ZR ^{S}
FX (Full-frame)	Enthusiast							^{4K} Zf ^{S}		
FX (Full-frame)	Enthusiast				^{4K} Z5 ^{S}					^{4K} Z5Ⅱ ^{S}
FX (Full-frame)	Entry-level									^{4K} Z5ⅡC ^{S}
DX (APS-C)	Enthusiast					^{4K} Zfc				
DX (APS-C)	Prosumer			^{4K} Z50					^{4K} Z50Ⅱ	
DX (APS-C)	Entry-level						^{4K} Z30			
Sensor	Class									
Sensor	Class	2018	2019	2020	2021	2022	2023	2024	2025	2026
