= Nikon Coolpix A =

Digital camera model

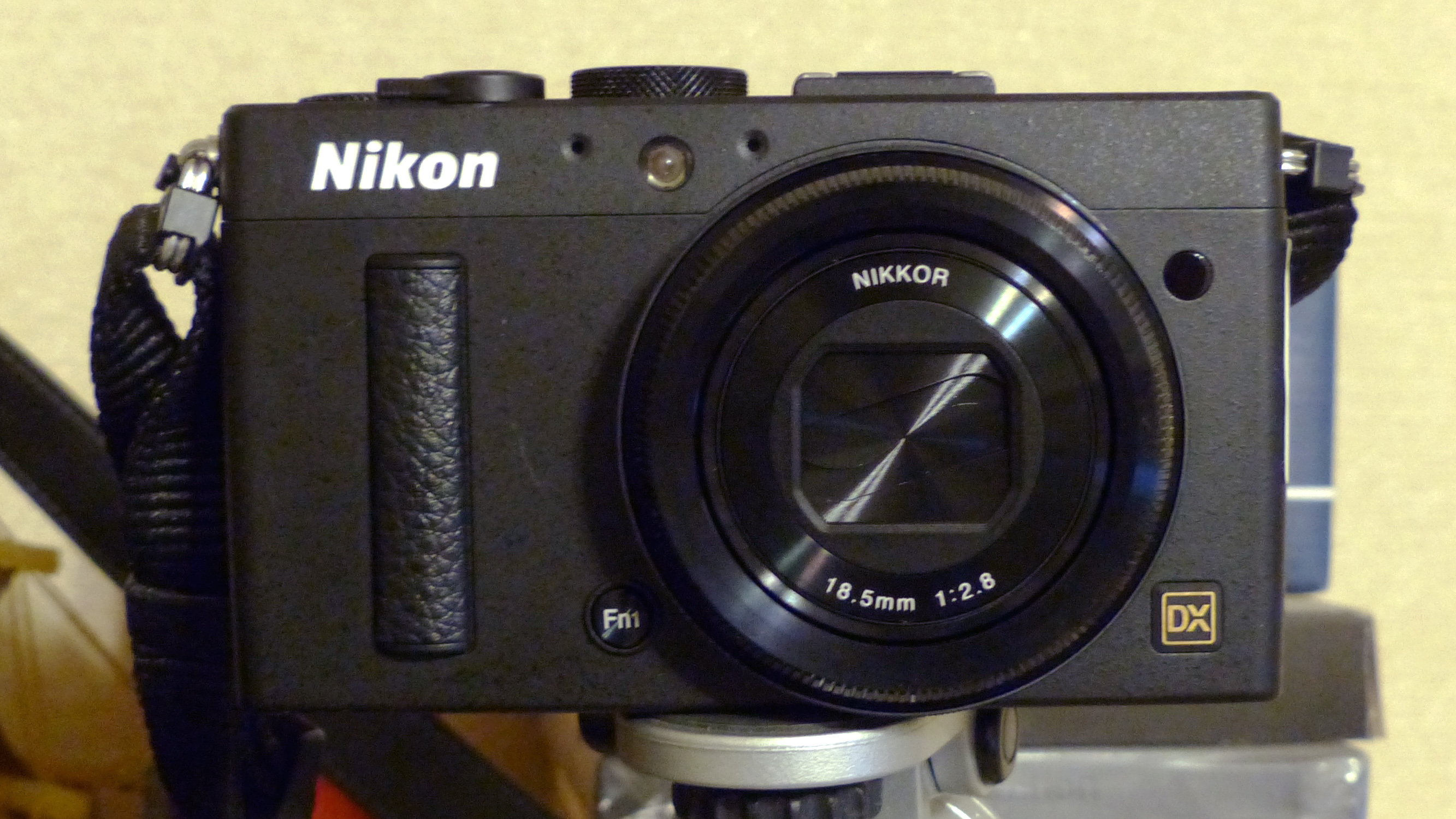
- Nikon Coolpix A Black

Overview
- Maker: Nikon
- Type: Large sensor fixed-lens camera
- Released: March 5, 2013
- Intro price: 1100 USD

Lens
- Lens: NIKKOR Lens 28mm (35mm equivalent)
- F-numbers: f/2.8

Sensor/medium
- Sensor type: CMOS
- Sensor size: 23.6 x 15.7mm (APS-C type)
- Sensor maker: Sony
- Maximum resolution: 4,928 × 3,264 (16.2 effective megapixels)
- Film speed: ISO Auto, 100, 200, 400, 800, 1600, 2000, 3200 6400, (12800, 25600 with boost)
- Recording medium: SD/SDHC/SDXC
- Storage media: SD card

Focusing
- Focus: Contrast detect Autofocus
- Focus modes: Instant single-servo (AF-S), Full time AF (AF-F), manual (M)
- Focus areas: Face detection, Center large, Center normal, Tracking.

Exposure/metering
- Metering modes: Matrix metering, Center weighted, Spot.

Flash
- Flash: TTL Pop-up Flash

Shutter
- Shutter: Leaf shutter
- Shutter speeds: 1/2000s to 30s
- Continuous shooting: 4 frames per second

Image processing
- White balance: Auto, Cloudy, Daylight, Flash, Fluorescent, Incandescent, Preset Manual

General
- Video recording: 1920 x 1080 (30, 25, 24fps), 1280 x 720p (30 fps), 640 x 480 (30, 25, 24 fps) MPEG-4, H.264
- LCD screen: 3 inches with 921,000 dots
- Battery: Nikon EN-EL20 (Li-Ion)
- Optional accessories: Nikon DF-CP1 Optical viewfinder, Nikon GP-1 GPS unit, Nikon ML-L3 Wireless Remote Control (Infrared), Nikon WU-1a Wireless Mobile Adapter.
- AV port: Mini HDMI (Type C)
- Data port(s): USB 2.0 (480 Mbit/sec), Accessorie port.
- Body features: Magnesium alloy body, Manual focus ring.
- Dimensions: 111 x 64 x 40mm (4.37 x 2.52 x 1.57 inches)
- Weight: 299 g (11 oz) including battery
- Made in: Japan

The Nikon Coolpix A is Nikon's first and only large sensor fixed lens compact camera. Released on March 5, 2013 it represents the premium flagship model of the Nikon Coolpix line. It features a 16 megapixel APS-C sized sensor and a retractable 28mm f2.8 equivalent NIKKOR Lens.

Ricoh released the first Ricoh GR only one month after the Coolpix A and both cameras have virtually the same technical specifications. Nikon never released a successor for the Coolpix A while Ricoh brought the fourth iteration of the GR in 2025.

== Features ==
- 16MP DX sensor
- 3.0" 921K LCD monitor
- Wi-Fi ready (requires WU-1a wireless module)
- Made in Japan
- CMOS sensor
- 18.5mm lens, 28mm equiv. on 35mm format
- 1080p 30/25/24P video recording
- JPEG and NEF (raw) picture recording
- SD card storage with SDHC and SDXC support

== See also ==
- Nikon
- Nikon Coolpix series
- List of large sensor fixed-lens cameras
