= Nikon D40 =

2006 APS-C digital single-lens reflex camera

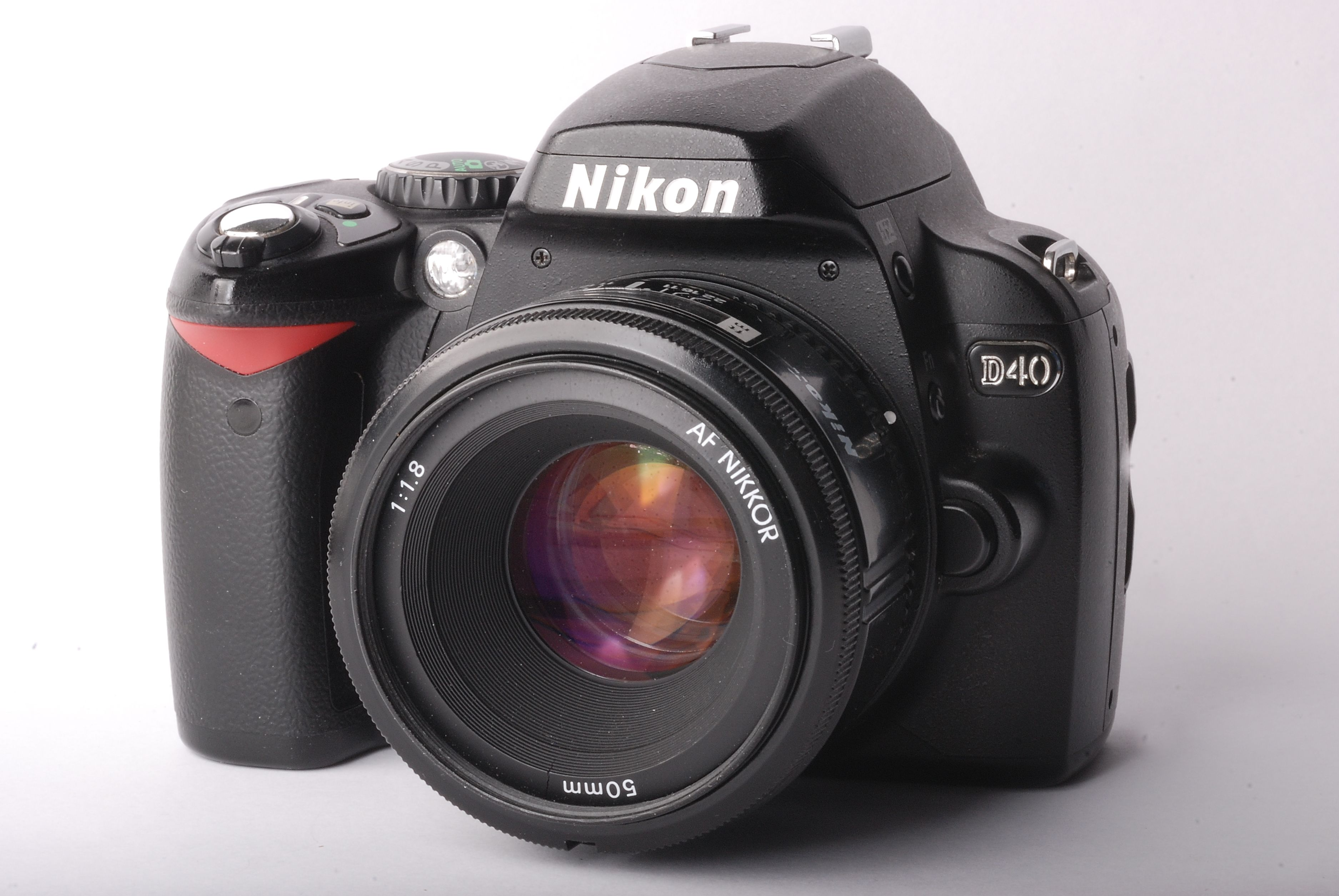

Overview
- Maker: Nikon
- Type: Digital single-lens reflex

Lens
- Lens: Interchangeable Nikon F-mount

Sensor/medium
- Sensor: Nikon DX format 23.7 mm × 15.6 mm (0.93 in × 0.61 in) CCD
- Maximum resolution: 3,008 × 2,000 (6.1 effective megapixels)
- Film speed: ISO 200-1600, ISO 3200 in high mode
- Storage media: Secure Digital, SDHC up to 32GB

Focusing
- Focus modes: autofocus: single (AF-S); continuous (AF-C); auto selection (AF-A); Manual
- Focus areas: 3 sensors, Multi-CAM530

Exposure/metering
- Exposure modes: Manual, Aperture Priority, Shutter Priority, Program and preset settings: Auto, Portrait, Landscape, Child, Sports, Macro, and Night Portrait
- Exposure metering: 420 segment color meter
- Metering modes: 3D Color Matrix, Center-weighted and Spot

Flash
- Flash: i-TTL Built-in or hotshoe (e.g. for the matching SB-400 Speedlight)

Shutter
- Shutter speed range: 1/4000 to 30 seconds, bulb; 1/500 Flash X-Sync
- Continuous shooting: 2.5 frame/s, 100 JPEG frames buffer

Viewfinder
- Viewfinder: optical, through the lens, pentamirror type, 0.8× magnification, 95% coverage

General
- LCD screen: 2.5", TFT, 230,000 pixel, 170° angle of view
- Battery: 1,000 mAh lithium-ion EN-EL9
- Dimensions: 126 mm × 94 mm × 64 mm (5.0 in × 3.7 in × 2.5 in)
- Weight: 475 g (16.8 oz) without battery 524.1 g (18.49 oz) with battery 729 g with battery and AF-S DX Zoom-Nikkor 18-55mm f/3.5-5.6G ED II kit lens
- Made in: Thailand

The Nikon D40 is a 6.1-megapixel DX format DSLR Nikon F-mount camera announced by Nikon on November 16, 2006. It replaces the D50 as Nikon's entry level DSLR. It features a 2.5-inch 230,000-dot resolution LCD, CCD sensor with ISO 200-1600 (3200 Hi-1) and 3D Color Matrix Metering.

The D40 was the first Nikon DSLR without an in-body focus motor. Autofocus requires the use of a lens with an integrated autofocus-motor.

In March 2007, Nikon released a sister model, the D40x, which included a 10.2-megapixel sensor and several other changes over the original D40.

== Features ==
- 6.1-megapixel Nikon DX format CCD Sensor
- 23.7 mm x 15.6 mm sensor size
- SD and SDHC memory card file storage
- ISO 200-1600. Hi-1 (ISO 3200)
- 2.5-inch color LCD monitor with 3 colorful display options
- File formats: JPEG, NEF (Nikon's RAW, 12-bit compressed)
- Nikon F-mount lenses
- 3-area auto focus
- Image assist
- Fires continuously at a speed of up to 2.5 frames per second
- EN-EL9 Lithium-ion battery
- Built-in speedlight with i-TTL automatic flash control
- Flash sync speed up to 1/500 sec
- In-camera retouching

== Reception ==
Reviews of the Nikon D40 have been generally favorable due to its ergonomics and image quality. It received some criticism for some design compromises Nikon undertook to keep the D40's price and size competitive.

== Nikon D40x ==
On March 6, 2007, Nikon introduced the D40X, a sister camera to the D40. While identical in external design to the D40, it has a 10.2-megapixel CCD sensor, continuous shooting up to 3 frames per second, and a base sensitivity of ISO 100. It has a flash sync speed of 1/200 of a second.

A new consumer-level telephoto zoom with vibration reduction debuted alongside the launch. Nikon ceased production of the D40X in December 2007, shortly before they introduced its successor, the Nikon D60.

== Gallery ==
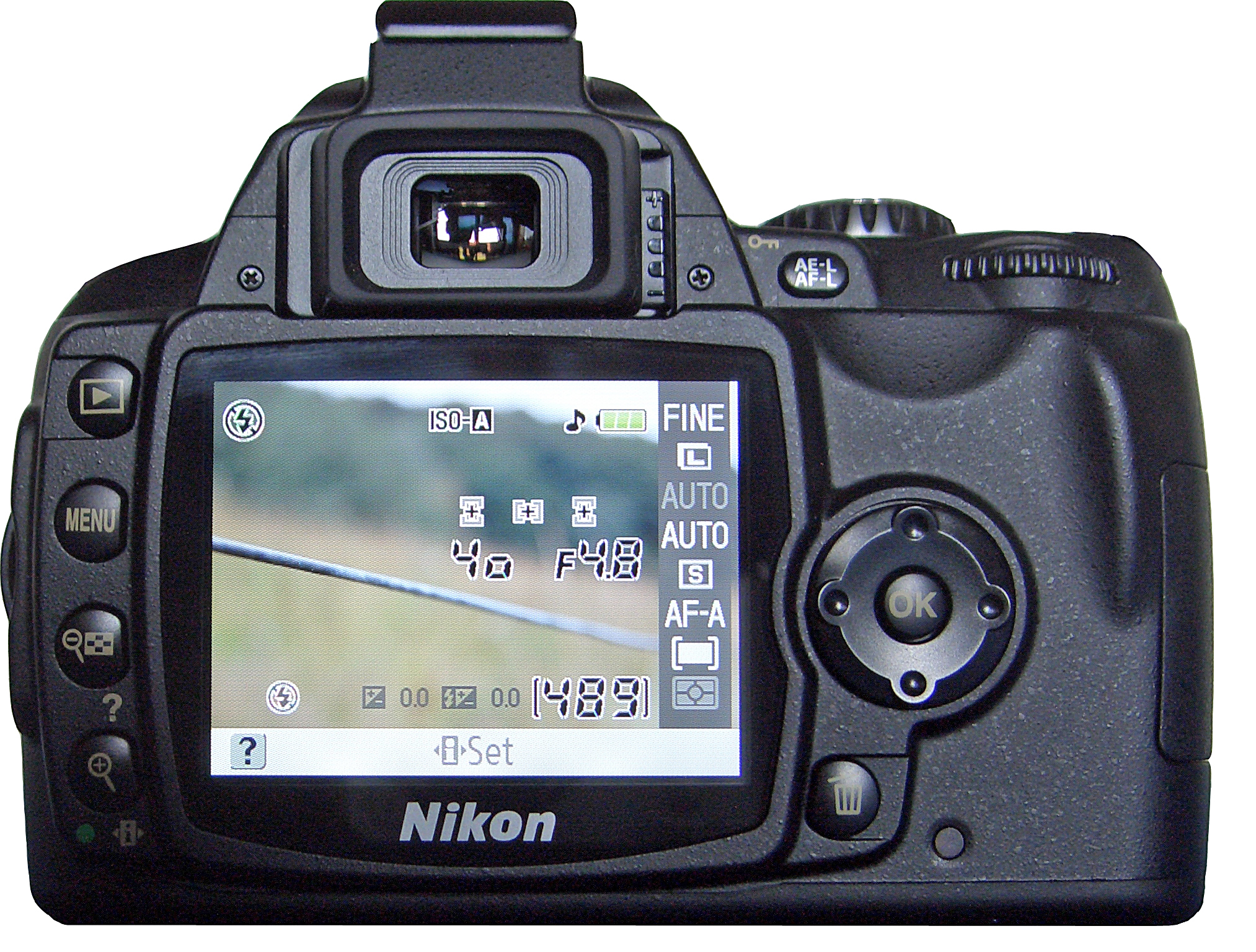
Rear panel of the D40

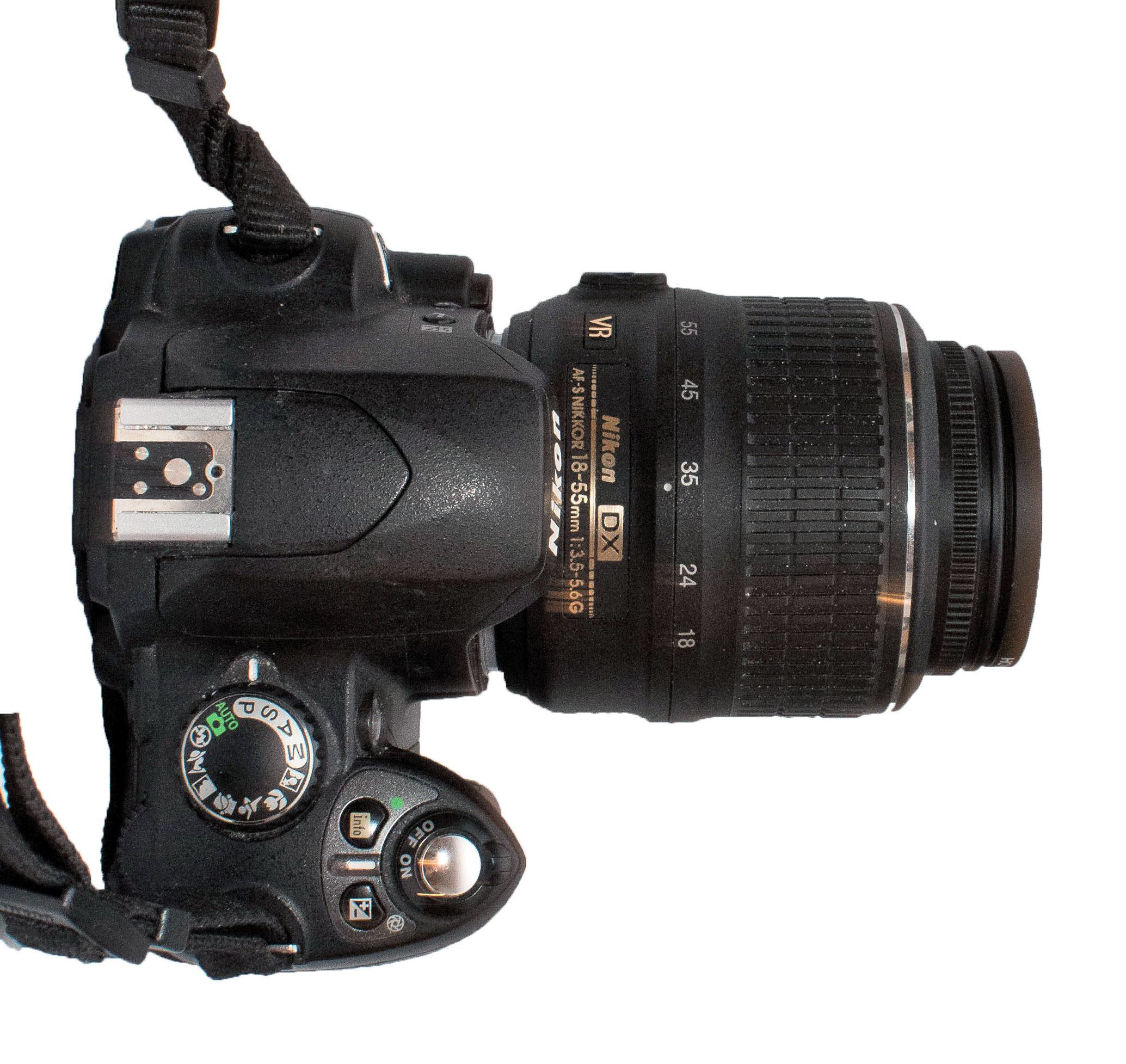
D40 with normal zoom equipped with a Nikkor 18-55mm f/3.5-5.6G VR kit lens

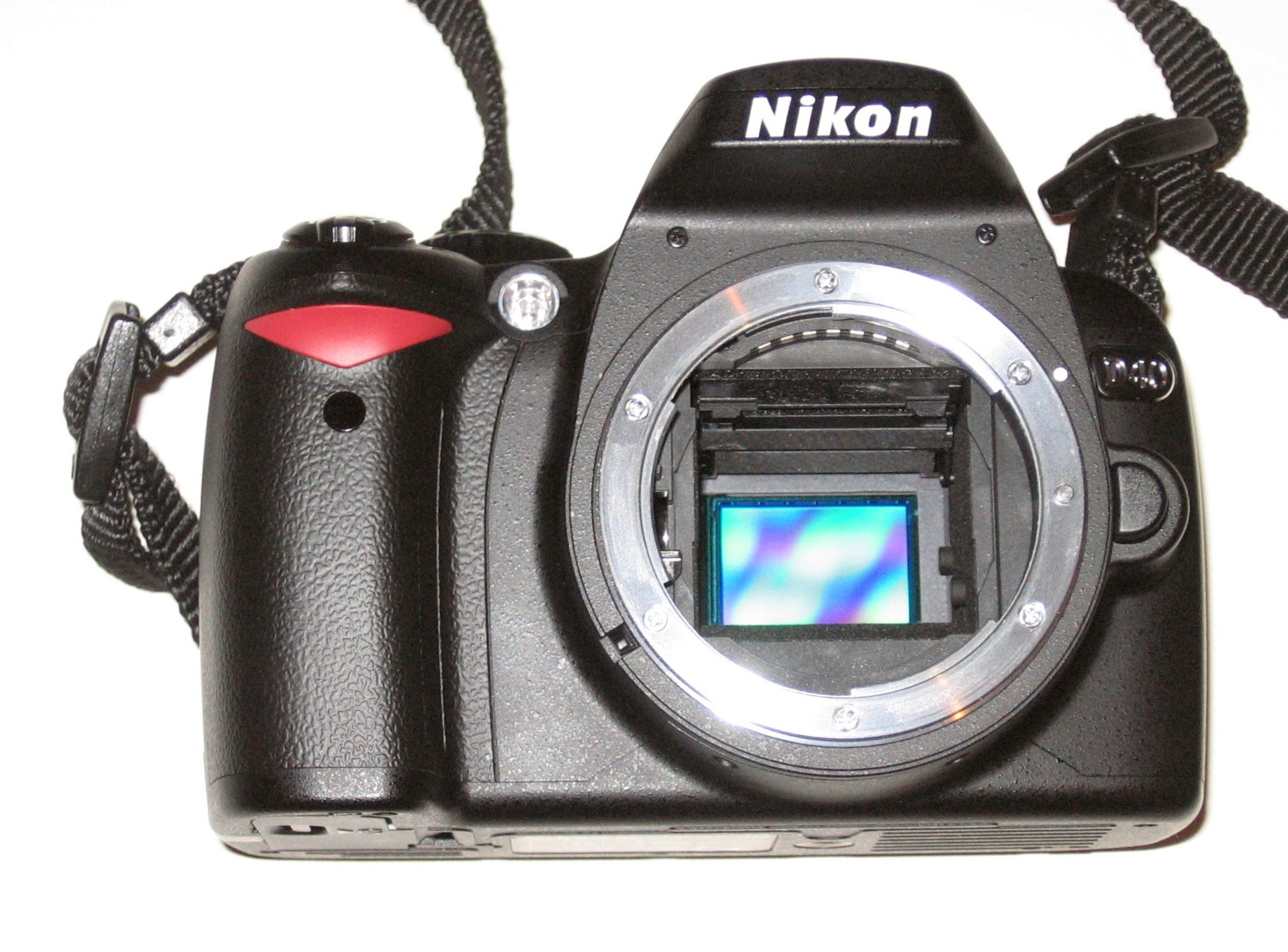
Showing the DX sensor of the D40

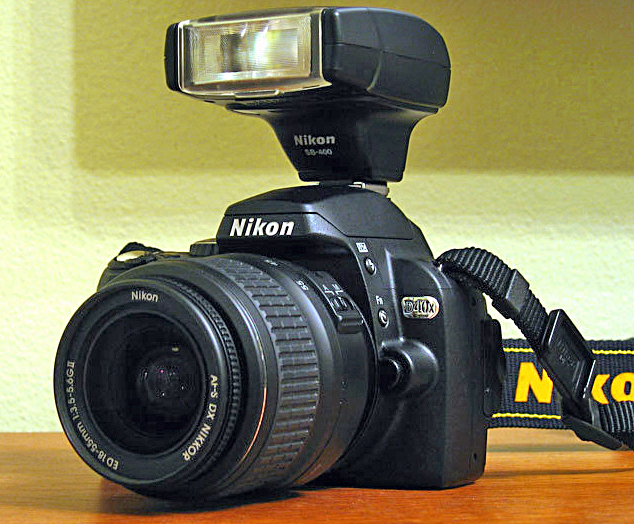
Nikon D40X with AF-S 18-55mm f/3.5-5.6G kit lens and SB-400 flash unit

== See also ==
- List of Nikon compatible lenses with integrated autofocus-motor
- Nikon EXPEED

Sensor	Class	'99	'00	'01	'02	'03	'04	'05	'06	'07	'08	'09	'10	'11	'12	'13	'14	'15	'16	'17	'18	'19	'20	'21	'22	'23	'24	'25	'26
FX (Full-frame)	Flagship											D3X ^{−P}																	
FX (Full-frame)	Flagship										D3 ^{−P}		D3S ^{−P}		D4		D4S		D5^{T}					D6^{T}					
FX (Full-frame)	Professional											D700 ^{−P}			D800/D800E			D810/D810A			D850 ^{AT}								
FX (Full-frame)	Enthusiast																Df												
FX (Full-frame)	Enthusiast																	D750 ^{A}					D780 ^{AT}						
FX (Full-frame)	Enthusiast															D600	D610												
DX (APS-C)	Flagship		D1^{−E}	D1X^{−E}				D2X^{−E}		D2Xs^{−E}																			
DX (APS-C)	Flagship		D1^{−E}	D1H ^{−E}			D2H^{−E}	D2Hs^{−E}																					
DX (APS-C)	Professional				D100^{−E}				D200^{−E}		D300^{−P}		D300S^{−P}						D500 ^{AT}										
DX (APS-C)	Enthusiast						D70^{−E}		D70s^{−E}	D80^{−E}		D90^{−E}		D7000 ^{−P}			D7100	D7200			D7500 ^{AT}								
DX (APS-C)	Upper-entry								D50^{−E}	D40X^{−E*}	D60^{−E*}		D5000^{A−P*}		D5100^{A−P*}	D5200^{A−P*}	D5300^{A*}	D5500^{AT*}		D5600 ^{AT*}									
DX (APS-C)	Entry-level									D40^{−E*}			D3000^{−E*}	D3100^{−P*}		D3200^{−P*}	D3300^{*}			D3400^{*}		D3500^{*}							
Early models		SVC (prototype; 1986); QV-1000C (1988); NASA F4 (1991); E2/E2S (1995); E2N/E2NS (1996); E3/E3S (1998)																											
Sensor	Class																												
Sensor	Class	'99	'00	'01	'02	'03	'04	'05	'06	'07	'08	'09	'10	'11	'12	'13	'14	'15	'16	'17	'18	'19	'20	'21	'22	'23	'24	'25	'26
