= Nikon D60 =

Digital single-lens reflex camera

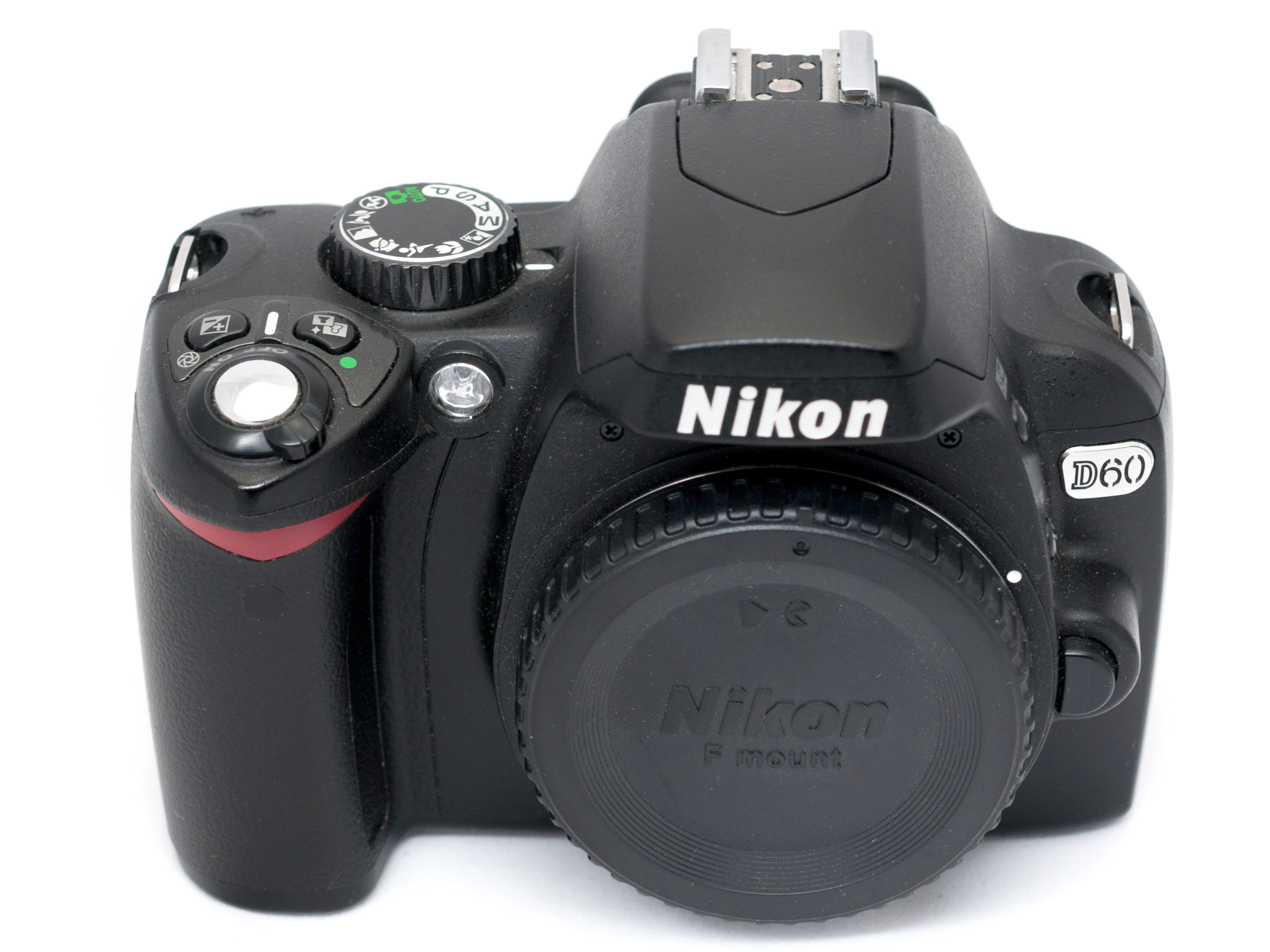

Overview
- Maker: Nikon
- Type: Digital single-lens reflex

Lens
- Lens: Interchangeable Nikon F-mount

Sensor/medium
- Sensor: 23.6 × 15.8 mm Nikon DX format RGB CCD sensor, 1.5 × FOV crop
- Maximum resolution: 3872 × 2592 (10.2 million effective pixels)
- Film speed: ISO 100–1600, with ISO 3200 deemed as "HI 1"
- Storage media: Secure Digital and Secure Digital High Capacity (max. 32GB)

Focusing
- Focus modes: Manual, Single shot AF, Continuous AF, Automatic AF Selection (AF operation subject to lens compatibility)
- Focus areas: 3 zone selectable: single area, dynamic area, closest subject

Exposure/metering
- Exposure modes: Automatic (Portrait, Landscape, Child, Sport, Closeup, Night Portrait, Aperture Priority, Shutter Priority, Programmed Auto, Stop Motion) and Manual Mode
- Exposure metering: TTL full-aperture exposure metering system
- Metering modes: Spot, Center Weighted, Matrix

Flash
- Flash: Built-in TTL Speedlight with hotshoe (e.g. for the matching SB-400 Speedlight)
- Flash bracketing: +1/-3 EV in 1/3 or 1/2 steps

Shutter
- Shutter: Combined mechanical and CCD electronic shutter
- Shutter speed range: 1/4000 to 30 seconds, bulb; 1/200 flash X-sync
- Continuous shooting: 3 frame/s

Viewfinder
- Viewfinder: Optical TTL

Image processing
- White balance: Automatic, Incandescent, Fluorescent, Direct Sunlight, Flash, Cloudy, Shade, Preset (Custom)

General
- LCD screen: 2.5 inch
- Battery: Nikon EN-EL family
- Optional battery packs: Nikon EN-EL9 Lithium Ion Battery
- Weight: 495 g (17 oz) without battery 522 g with EN-EL9 battery. 787 g with battery and Nikon DX 18–55mm 1:3.5-5.6 VR kit lens Approx. 126 × 94 × 64 mm (5.0 × 3.7 × 2.5 in.)
- Made in: Thailand

Chronology
- Predecessor: Nikon D40x

The Nikon D60 is a 10.2-megapixel Nikon F-mount digital single-lens reflex camera announced in January 2008. The D60 succeeds the entry-level Nikon D40x. It features the Nikon EXPEED image processor introduced in the higher-end Nikon D3 and D300.

Like a number of other entry-level Nikon DSLRs, the D60 has no in-body autofocus motor, and fully automatic autofocus requires the use of a lens with an integrated autofocus-motor. With any other lenses the camera's electronic rangefinder can be used to manually adjust focus.

== New features ==
Compared to the D40, new features of the Nikon D60 include:

- Stop-motion movie creation
- Nikon EI-137 processor (same as D3000, D80, D40x, D40)
- Self-cleaning sensor unit
- Air-flow Control System that reduces the amount of dust that reaches the sensor
- LCD Screen Orientation Rotation
- Active D-Lighting (one level)
- Kit lens with Vibration Reduction (VR) for same kit price as D40 before the Nikon D60 was released on February 24, 2008.
- Manual flipping built-in flash with GN 12/39 (meters/feet) at ISO 100, 1/200 second maximum x-sync speed and has combination of auto, red eye reduction, slow sync and rear curtain, but not capable to be a Commander in Nikon's Wireless Lighting System.

== Continuity ==
The Nikon D60 body is very similar to the Nikon D40, with the placement of several key buttons being the most notable difference. Like the D40, the Nikon D60 has no secondary display on top of the body (common in higher-end DSLR's), but instead displays shutter speed, f-stop, ISO and other information on the main LCD screen.

== Reception ==
Digital Photography Review said that the D60 is more of a "subtle upgrade" to the D40 and praised its boost in performance, and new features such as Nikon D-Lighting and the dust-reduction system. They criticized the lack of mid-range features, such as a vertical grip and poor performance at high ISO when compared to Canon.

Ken Rockwell criticized the slower flash sync, more megapixels, and lower base ISO. However, he praised the camera's manual focus indicator, saying it was better than his D3.

Both Digital Photography Review and Rockwell noted that the lack of an in-body focus motor was not a problem due to the wide availability of AF-S lenses and their belief that serious photographers using more exotic Nikon lenses would be shooting with a D200 or higher, not the D60.

== See also ==
- List of Nikon F-mount lenses with integrated autofocus motors

Sensor	Class	'99	'00	'01	'02	'03	'04	'05	'06	'07	'08	'09	'10	'11	'12	'13	'14	'15	'16	'17	'18	'19	'20	'21	'22	'23	'24	'25	'26
FX (Full-frame)	Flagship											D3X ^{−P}																	
FX (Full-frame)	Flagship										D3 ^{−P}		D3S ^{−P}		D4		D4S		D5^{T}					D6^{T}					
FX (Full-frame)	Professional											D700 ^{−P}			D800/D800E			D810/D810A			D850 ^{AT}								
FX (Full-frame)	Enthusiast																Df												
FX (Full-frame)	Enthusiast																	D750 ^{A}					D780 ^{AT}						
FX (Full-frame)	Enthusiast															D600	D610												
DX (APS-C)	Flagship		D1^{−E}	D1X^{−E}				D2X^{−E}		D2Xs^{−E}																			
DX (APS-C)	Flagship		D1^{−E}	D1H ^{−E}			D2H^{−E}	D2Hs^{−E}																					
DX (APS-C)	Professional				D100^{−E}				D200^{−E}		D300^{−P}		D300S^{−P}						D500 ^{AT}										
DX (APS-C)	Enthusiast						D70^{−E}		D70s^{−E}	D80^{−E}		D90^{−E}		D7000 ^{−P}			D7100	D7200			D7500 ^{AT}								
DX (APS-C)	Upper-entry								D50^{−E}	D40X^{−E*}	D60^{−E*}		D5000^{A−P*}		D5100^{A−P*}	D5200^{A−P*}	D5300^{A*}	D5500^{AT*}		D5600 ^{AT*}									
DX (APS-C)	Entry-level									D40^{−E*}			D3000^{−E*}	D3100^{−P*}		D3200^{−P*}	D3300^{*}			D3400^{*}		D3500^{*}							
Early models		SVC (prototype; 1986); QV-1000C (1988); NASA F4 (1991); E2/E2S (1995); E2N/E2NS (1996); E3/E3S (1998)																											
Sensor	Class																												
Sensor	Class	'99	'00	'01	'02	'03	'04	'05	'06	'07	'08	'09	'10	'11	'12	'13	'14	'15	'16	'17	'18	'19	'20	'21	'22	'23	'24	'25	'26
