= Internal focusing =

An internal focusing lens (abbreviated as IF) is a photographic lens design in which focus is adjusted by moving internal lens element(s). In contrast, traditional unit focusing lenses are focused by adjusting the distance between the entire set of lens elements and the imaging plane, usually through a helicoid or rack and pinion mechanism.

== Characteristics ==
Unit focusing prime lenses do not rotate or shift the front lens element; the entire lens moves in a linear direction perpendicular to the imaging plane. As an alternative, some prime and zoom lenses use front cell focusing, in which only the front element(s) of the lens are moved to adjust focus; however, with front cell focusing, typically the front element(s) rotate as focus is adjusted.

Diagram of Nikkor 200 mm f/2 IF-ED, showing internal focusing lens group

Starting in the 1960s, optical designers began developing floating element lenses, which incorporate elements from zoom lens design and automatically adjust the internal distance between element(s) and group(s) as the lens is focused to reduce astigmatism, improving lens performance at close ranges. As a parallel evolution, lenses were developed in which internal element(s) could be adjusted to vary focus distance, which has significant advantages in lens size, handling, and sealing. This also means internal focusing lenses do not rotate or shift the front lens element. This makes it easy to use, for example, a screwed-in polarizing filter or a petal shaped lens hood without having to readjust those items when the lens is focused. For macro photography, using an internal focus lens also reduces the risk of the front of the lens accidentally hitting the subject during focusing as the front element does not move. The same advantages apply to rear group internal focusing, in which the rear elements are moved to vary focus.

The physical size of an internal focusing lens does not change during focus, nor does the front of the lens rotate. This is particularly useful for large lenses, keeping the size more compact, or when using filters or accessories mounted on the front of the lens that may require careful alignment.

One issue internal focusing lens can have is that the true focal length of the lens is reduced when not focused at infinity.

== See also ==
- Breathing (lens)
