= Image circle =

Cross-section of the cone of light produced by a lens

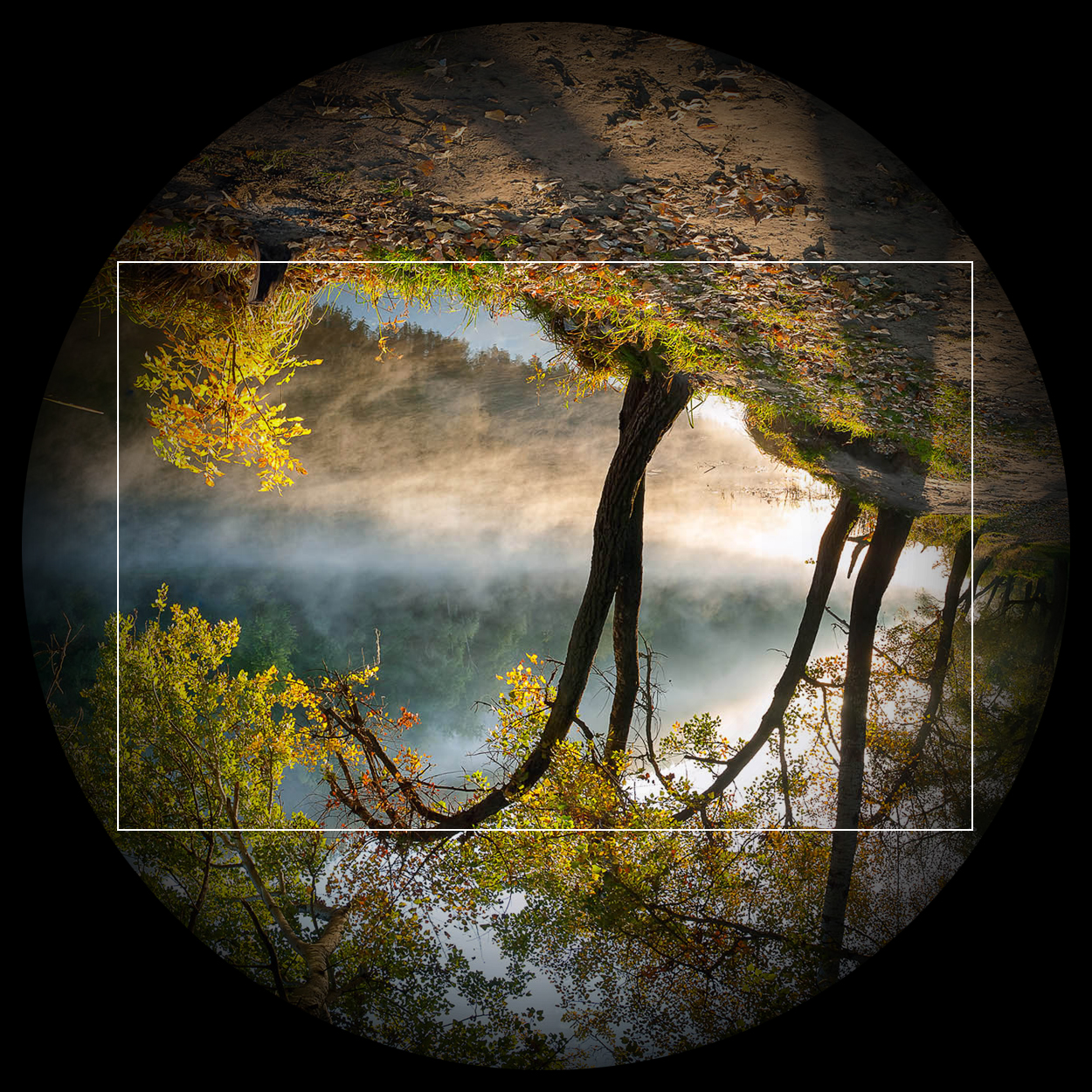
A simulation of an image circle formed inside a camera. The rectangle marks the film area of the photographic film or image sensor. In practice, the edge of the image circle is sometimes less abrupt than shown, and the image quality near the periphery is degraded in more complex ways than is simulated here.

The image circle is the cross section of the cone of light transmitted by a lens or series of lenses onto the image plane. When this light strikes a perpendicular target such as photographic film or a digital camera sensor, it forms a circle of light – the image circle. Various sensor aspect ratios may be used which all fit inside the same image circle, 3:2, 4:3, 16:9, etc.

A lens to be used on a camera that provides movements must have an image circle larger than the size of the image format (Adams 1980, 54). To avoid vignetting, a photographer using a view camera must ensure that the area remains within the image circle (Adams 1980, 56–57; 151–52; 157–61); a tilt/shift lens or perspective-control lens used on a small- or medium-format camera usually has mechanical limitations that keep the frame area within the image circle.

== See also ==
- Film format
- Image sensor format
- Format factor
