= Pentax DA 50mm lens =

SMC Pentax-DA 50mm f/1.8
- Maker: Pentax

Technical data
- Type: Prime
- Focal length: 50mm
- Focal length (35mm equiv.): 75mm
- Crop factor: 1.0
- Aperture (max/min): f/1.8 / f/22
- Close focus distance: 0.45 metres (1.5 ft)
- Max. magnification: 0.15x
- Diaphragm blades: 7, rounded
- Construction: 6 elements in 5 groups

Features
- Application: Normal prime

Physical
- Max. length: 38.5 millimetres (1.52 in)
- Diameter: 63.0 millimetres (2.48 in)
- Weight: 122 grams (4.3 oz)
- Filter diameter: 52mm

Accessories
- Lens hood: RH-RA 52mm
- Case: S70-70

Angle of view
- Diagonal: 46° (full frame); 31.5° (APS-C)

History
- Introduction: 2012

Retail info
- MSRP: 249.95 USD

The SMC Pentax-DA 50mm f/1.8 lens is a normal prime lens for the Pentax K-mount. The 75mm equivalent focal length on APS-C cameras and fast f/1.8 aperture make it well suited for portrait photography. It uses a simple double-Gauss design of 6 elements in 5 groups.

Similar lenses from other manufacturers include the Canon EF 50mm f/1.8 II and Nikon AF Nikkor 50 mm f/1.8D.
