= Fujifilm FinePix S200EXR =

FinePix S200EXR
Overview
- Maker: Fujifilm
- Type: Digital bridge camera

Lens
- Lens mount: fixed
- Lens: Fujinon 14.3× optical zoom lens with optical stabilization

Focusing
- Focus: Autofocus; Contrast detection

Exposure/metering
- Exposure: 30 seconds ~ 1/4000 second

Flash
- Flash: Super Intelligent flash

General
- Dimensions: 133.4 (W) x 93.6 (H) x 145.0 (D) mm / 5.3 (W) x 3.7 (H) x 5.7 (D) in.
- Weight: Approx. 820g / 28.9oz
- Made in: China

The Fujifilm FinePix S200EXR (also known as S205EXR) is a digital bridge camera from Fujifilm introduced in July 2009.

It features a 12-megapixel, 1/1.6" EXR sensor, Fujifilm's 9th generation of Super CCD, first seen in F200EXR, and uses same body and lens as FinePix S100fs.

The main features of the EXR sensor is the new color filter, different from largely used Bayer filter, and pixel binning capability, which it uses to produce higher dynamic range and better sensitivity. Due to the nature of EXR technology, high sensitivity (SN) and high dynamic range (DR) modes produce 6 Megapixel resolution images.

The S200EXR has the shape and size of a small DSLR, but with a fixed lens. However, unlike a DSLR, the S200EXR features an 0.2-inch, 200,000-dot FLCD color electronic viewfinder. Framerate of the viewfinder can be adjust in the menu system from 30 fps to 50 fps (half-pressed shutter only). The rear LCD screen of the S200EXR is a conventional non-rotating, non-articulating 2.7-inch 230,000-dot panel.

The S200EXR's controls are very similar to that of an actual DSLR with buttons for exposure compensation, ISO, focus and metering modes, and knobs for exposure modes and a thumb wheel. The S200EXR lost the PC sync socket of the S100FS, but keeps the hot shoe.

The lens used on the Fujifilm S200EXR is a variable-aperture zoom. Its widest focal length is 30.5 mm and zooms up to 436 mm (135 format). It is the same lens that was on the Fujifilm S100FS. However, because of the smaller sensor size of the S200EXR (1/1.6" vs 2/3"), its focal length has changed. Its widest aperture is F2.8 and closes down to F5.3 at its longest focal length. Unlike other bridge cameras at the time, the S200EXR featured a manual-twist zoom lens similar to that of an actual DSLR. The lens also features optical image stabilization (estimated 2-stop effectiveness). The lens features a fly-by-wire focus ring which is situated closest to the camera's body. It can be used in manual-focus mode with the assist of an focus scale in the viewfinder. The lens can focus as close as 1 cm in Super Macro Mode.

The S200EXR is powered by a proprietary lithium-ion battery which is supplied with the camera as well as a neck strap and lens cap. Optional accessories were a bayonet-type lens hood with an opening for turning polarized filters, an AC power adapter, and remote release.

== Movie mode ==
The S200EXR can record video at a maximum resolution of 640×480 at 30 fps with mono sound in .avi format. Focus and zoom can be adjusted whilst recording. The camera can record as long as there is memory available and battery power.

== Quirks ==
The owners manual states that the camera can be awakened from sleep by pressing the "play" button for about a second. This is false. Annoyingly, the camera must be turned off and then on again.

The EXR sensor in the S200EXR, as well as other EXR sensor cameras exhibit strange artifacts in 12 MP High Resolution Priority mode. This is due to having two of the same color filters next to each other.

CCD-RAW files that were shot in EXR-DR Priority and EXR-SN Priority modes are extremely large for a 6-megapixel output. Some file sizes exceed 20 MB. This is due to having two separate images recorded onto a single file. An example would be a highlight image and the shadow image recoded onto the same raw file that was shot in EXR-DR mode. Other reasons may be due to the Super CCD structure and interpolation needed to make the honeycomb layout into a normal square layout.

== See also ==
- Fujifilm FinePix S-series
