= FinePix S2 Pro =

Digital camera model

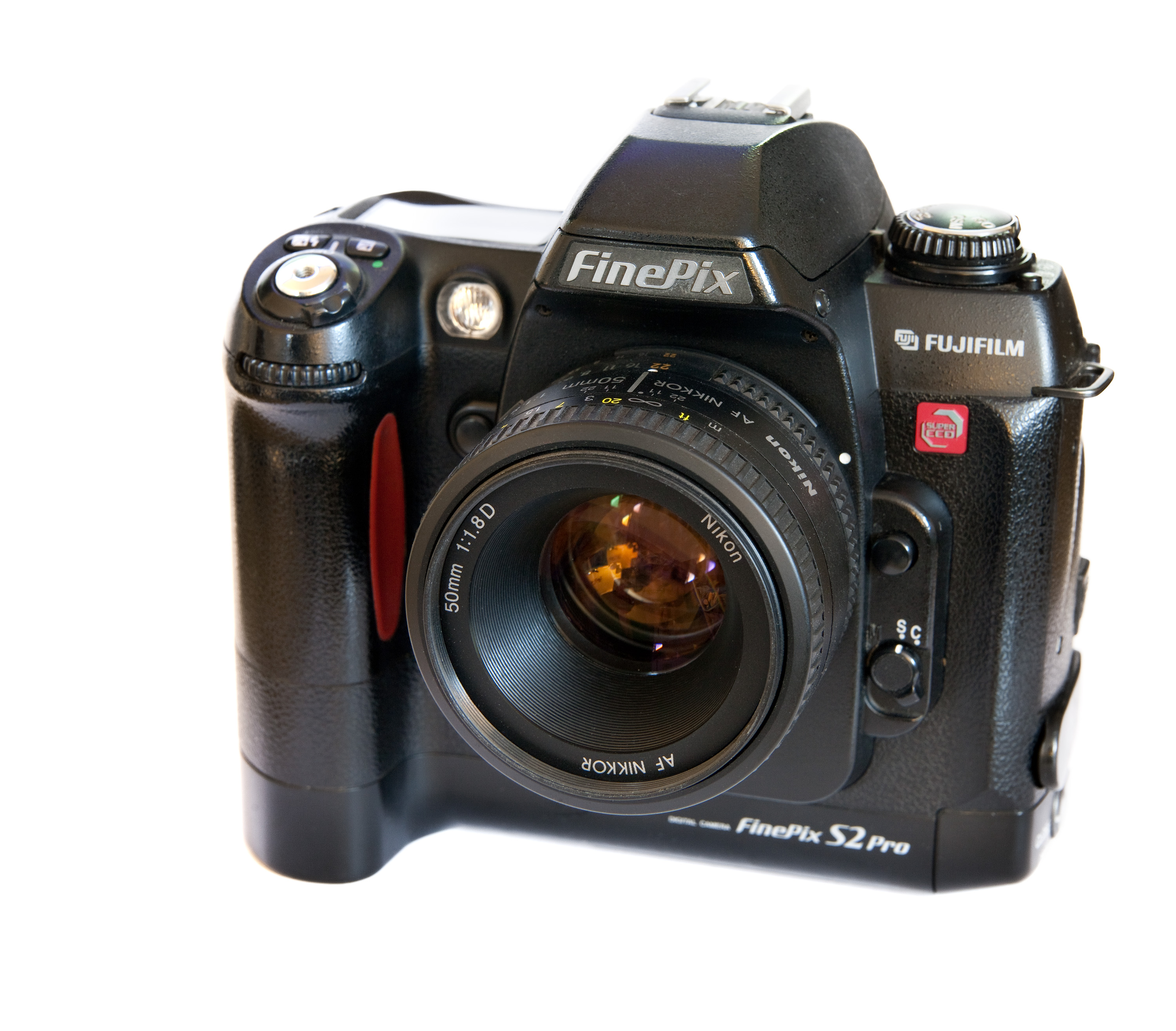
A Fujifilm FinePix S2 Pro, with a Nikon 50mm f/1.8D.

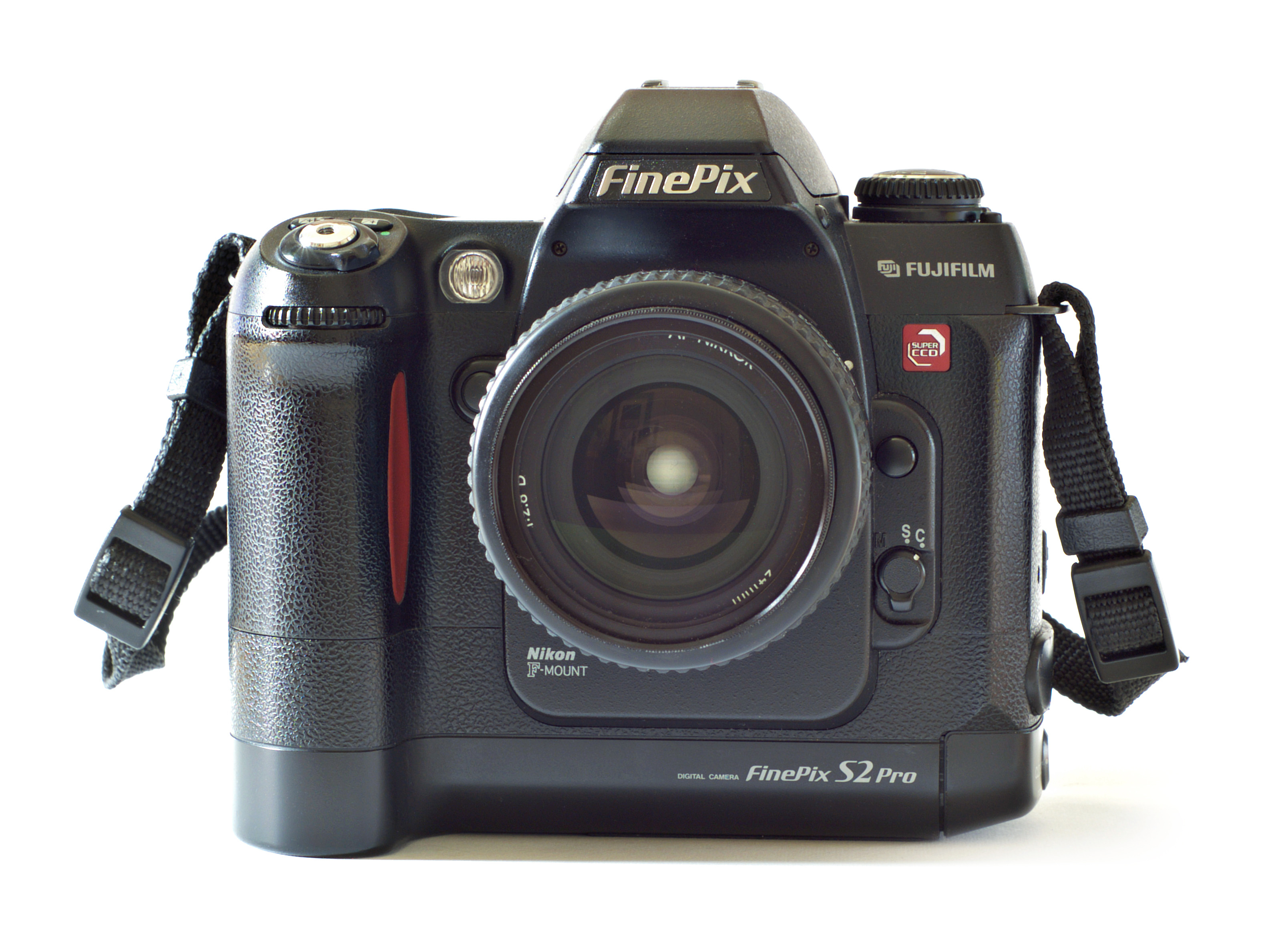
FinePix S2 Pro from front

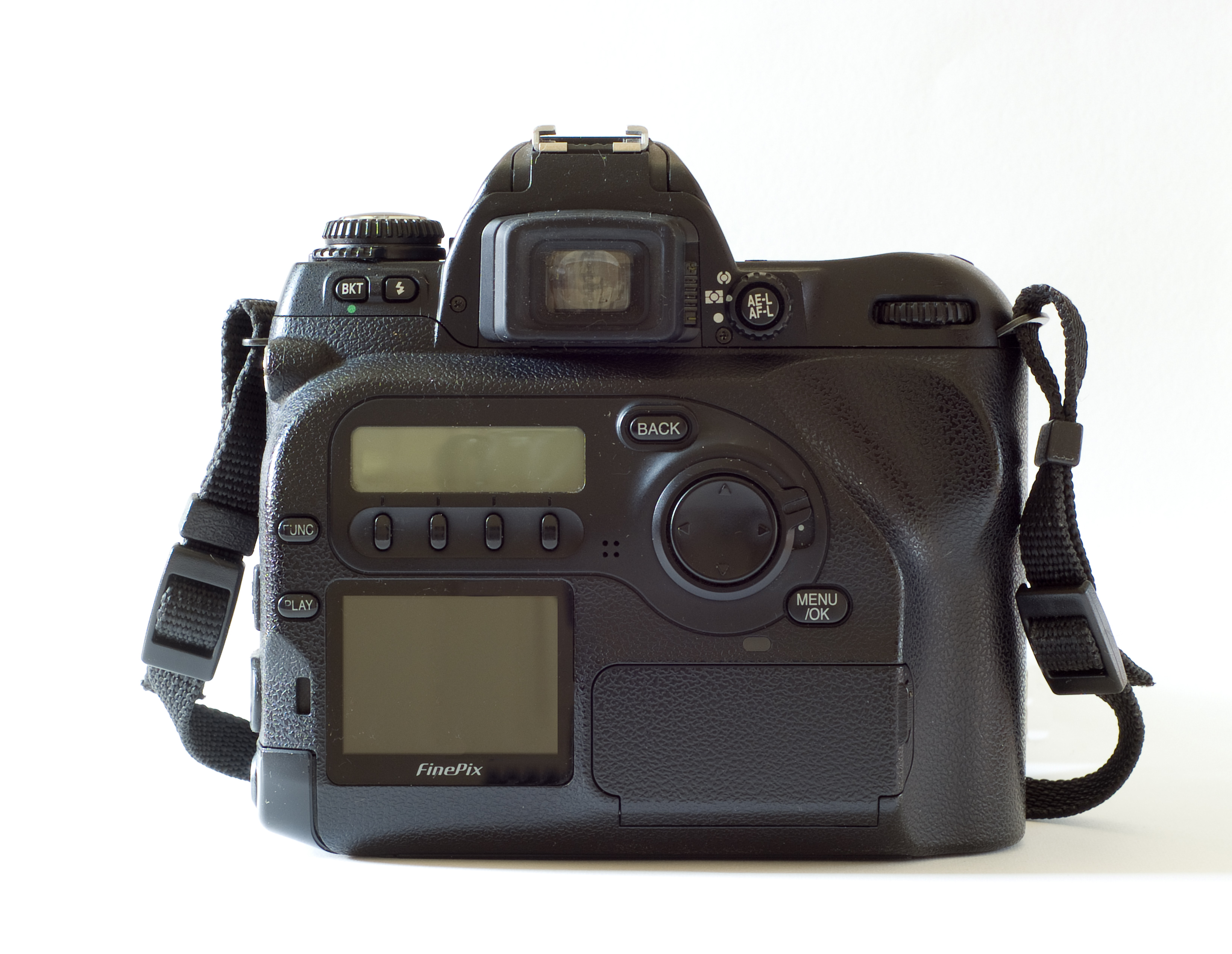
FinePix S2 Pro from rear

The Fujifilm FinePix S2 Pro is an interchangeable lens digital single-lens reflex camera introduced in January 2002. It is based on a Nikon F80 (N80 in the U.S.) film camera body that was modified by Fujifilm to include its own proprietary image sensor and electronics. Because of the Nikon body, it has a Nikon AF lens mount and so can use most lenses made for Nikon 35 mm cameras. It is autofocusing, with an electronically controlled focal plane shutter with speeds from 30 sec. to 1/4000 sec., built-in exposure metering and pop-up flash. Its ISO film speed equivalents range from 100 - 1600. The S2 Pro also has sound recording capability. The camera is no longer in production, having been superseded by the Fujifilm FinePix S3 Pro in February 2004.

Aside from the Nikon lens mount, the camera's principal distinction is its 6.17 megapixel photo sensor. Known as the Super CCD, it is unique in having its photodiodes oriented diagonally rather than horizontally and vertically as in all other DSLR cameras. This allows the use of a sophisticated interpolation system that produces an output image equivalent to 12.1 megapixels. The apparent resolution of images in this interpolated mode lies somewhere between 6.17 megapixels and the 12.1 megapixel interpolated output.

A huge number of these cameras were built using a Sony sourced defective CCD that was subject to a recall by Fuji. The recall ended when the stock of these replacement CCD's was depleted. There is word that no other stockpiles exist of this Super HAD CCD, making these cameras that are found with the purple or black tinted image problems unfixable and only usable for parts. The Fuji F700 used a similar defective HAD CCD, but in 3.1/6.2Mp size. That camera has met a similar fate.

Family	Level	Sensor	1998	1999	2000	2001	2002	2003	2004	2005	2006	2007	2008	2009	2010
Fujix	Professional	2/3 inch		DS-565											
Fujix	Professional	2/3 inch		DS-560											
FinePix	Industrial	APS-C										S3 Pro UVIR	IS Pro		
FinePix	Advanced	APS-C			S1 Pro		S2 Pro		S3 Pro			S5 Pro			
