= Super CCD =

Digital camera sensor design

Layout of sensors on Super CCD matrices

Super CCD is a proprietary charge-coupled device image sensor design that was developed by Fujifilm starting in 1999 and marketed with its digital cameras, starting with the FinePix 4700 and S1 Pro. Super CCD cameras were sold until 2010. The Super CCD uses octagonal, rather than rectangular, pixels. This allows a higher horizontal and vertical resolution (at the expense of diagonal resolution) to be achieved compared to a traditional sensor of an equivalent pixel count.

== Evolution ==
SuperCCD sensors and cameras
Size Gen		1/2.7"	1/2.5"		1/1.7"	1/1.6"		2/3"	APS-C
1	Interpolated resolution	—N/a	—N/a		2400×1800 (4 MP)	—N/a		—N/a	3040×2016 (6 MP)
1	Native resolution	—N/a	—N/a		2.4 MP	—N/a		—N/a	3.07 MP
1	Cameras	—N/a	—N/a		4500, 4700Z, 4800Z, 4900Z, 40i, 50i, DS-270HD	—N/a		—N/a	S1 Pro
2	Interpolated resolution	—N/a	—N/a		2832×2128 (6 MP)	—N/a		—N/a	—N/a
2	Native resolution	—N/a	—N/a		3.3 MP	—N/a		—N/a	—N/a
2	Cameras	—N/a	—N/a		6800Z, 6900Z	—N/a		—N/a	—N/a
3	Interpolated resolution	2304×1728 (4 MP)	—N/a		2832×2128 (6 MP)	—N/a		—N/a	4256×2848 (12 MP)
3	Native resolution	2.1 MP	—N/a		3.1 MP	—N/a		—N/a	6.17 MP
3	Cameras	F401, F402	—N/a		F601, M603, S602	—N/a		—N/a	S2 Pro
4 (HR)	Interpolated resolution	2816×2120 (6 MP)	—N/a		4048×3040 (12 MP)	—N/a		—N/a	—N/a
4 (HR)	Native resolution	3.14 MP	—N/a		6.3 MP	—N/a		—N/a	—N/a
4 (HR)	Cameras	A310, F410, F420, S5000	—N/a		E550, F610, F810, S7000	—N/a		—N/a	—N/a
4 (SR)	Interpolated resolution	—N/a	—N/a		2832×2128 (6 MP)	—N/a		—N/a	—N/a
4 (SR)	Native resolution	—N/a	—N/a		2×3.14 MP	—N/a		—N/a	—N/a
4 (SR)	Cameras	—N/a	—N/a		F700, F710, S20	—N/a		—N/a	—N/a
5 (HR)	Interpolated resolution	—N/a	2302×1728 (4 MP)	2736×1824 (5 MP)	2848×2136 (6 MP)	3072×2304 (7 MP)	3488×2616 (9 MP)	—N/a	—N/a
5 (HR)	Native resolution	—N/a	4.1 MP	5.1 MP	6.3 MP	7.3 MP	9 MP	—N/a	—N/a
5 (HR)	Cameras	—N/a	A400	A500, S5200/5600, V10, Z1, Z2, Z3	A600, F10, F11	A700	A900, A920, E900, IS-1, S9000/S9500, S9100/S9600	—N/a	—N/a
6 (HR)	Interpolated resolution	—N/a	2848×2136 (6 MP)		2848×2136 (6 MP)	3296×2472 (8 MP)		—N/a	—N/a
6 (HR)	Native resolution	—N/a	6.3 MP		6.3 MP	8.3 MP		—N/a	—N/a
6 (HR)	Cameras	—N/a	A610, Z5fd		F20, F30, F31fd, S6500fd	A800, A820, F40fd		—N/a	—N/a
6 (SR II)	Interpolated resolution	—N/a	—N/a		—N/a	—N/a		—N/a	4256×2848 (12 MP)
6 (SR II)	Native resolution	—N/a	—N/a		—N/a	—N/a		—N/a	2×6.17 MP
6 (SR II)	Cameras	—N/a	—N/a		—N/a	—N/a		—N/a	S3 Pro, S3 Pro UV/IR, S5 Pro, IS Pro
7	Interpolated resolution	—N/a	—N/a		—N/a	4000×3000 (12 MP)		—N/a	—N/a
7	Native resolution	—N/a	—N/a		—N/a	12 MP		—N/a	—N/a
7	Cameras	—N/a	—N/a		—N/a	F50fd,		—N/a	—N/a
8	Interpolated resolution	—N/a	—N/a		—N/a	4000×3000 (12 MP)		3840×2880 (11 MP)	—N/a
8	Native resolution	—N/a	—N/a		—N/a	12 MP		11.1 MP	—N/a
8	Cameras	—N/a	—N/a		—N/a	F60fd, F100fd		S100FS	—N/a

The first generation of SuperCCD sensors was released with the FinePix 4700 Zoom and S1 Pro DSLR, announced in January 2000.

On January 21, 2003 Fujifilm announced the fourth generation of SuperCCD sensors, in two variations: SuperCCD HR and SuperCCD SR. HR stands for "high resolution" and SR stands for "super dynamic range". The SR sensor has two photodiodes per photosite, one much larger than the other. Appropriately processing information from both can yield larger black to white range of brightness (dynamic range). Fujifilm announced a Super CCD back for its GX680 system that December, with 20.68 million sensors yielding an effective resolution of 41.36 MP.

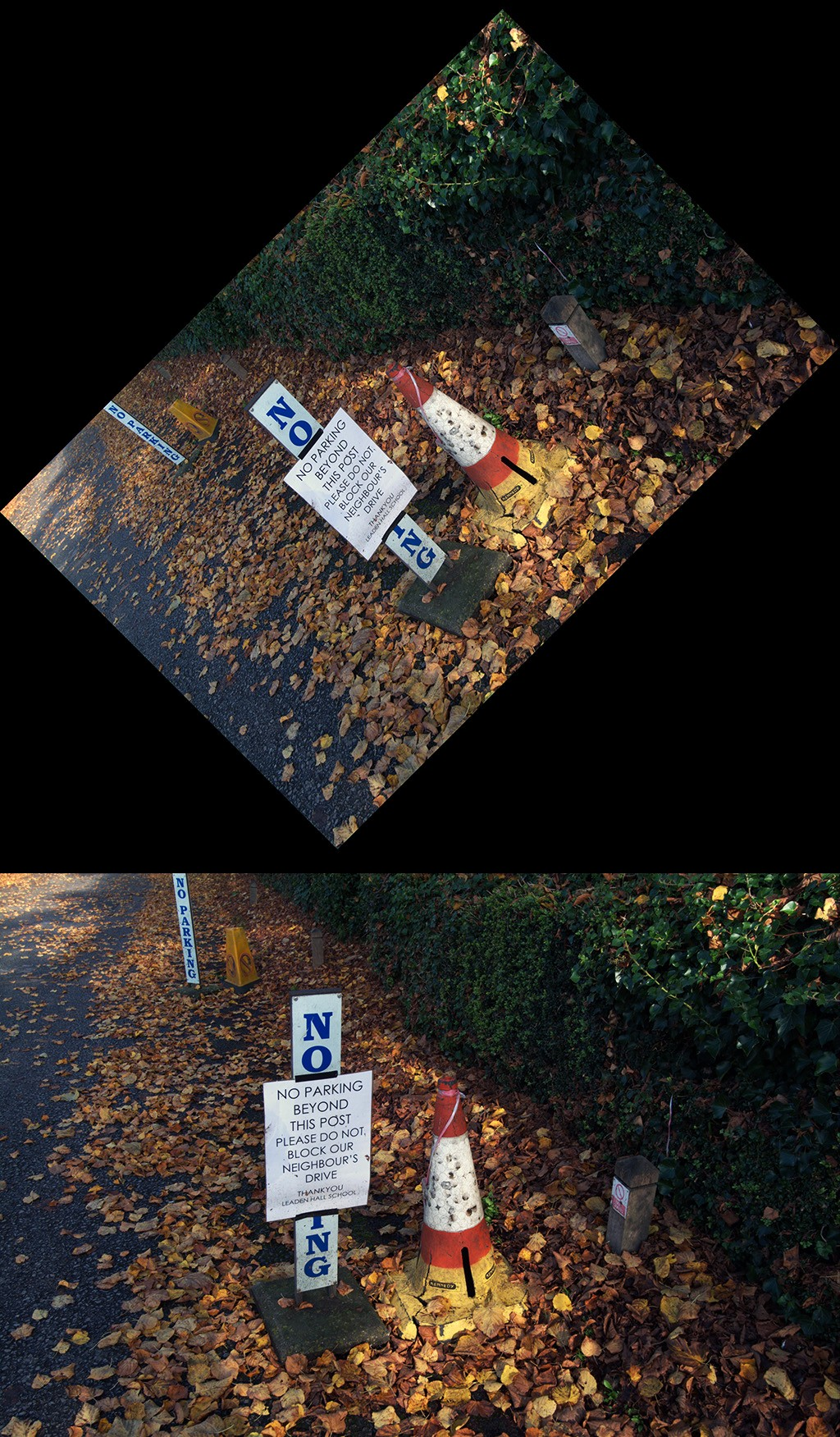
An illustration of the Super CCD pixel alignment, taken with a Fuji S2 Pro. The top image was translated with DCRaw, without scaling or pixel rotation.

The 4th Generation Super CCD HR has sensors placed at 45 degrees to the horizontal. In order to convert the images into the normal horizontal/vertical pixel orientation, it interpolates one pixel between each pair of sensors, thereby producing 12 recorded megapixels from 6 effective megapixels. By contrast, Fujifilm says that 5th Generation Super CCD HR sensors are also at 45 degrees but do not interpolate. However, it omits to explain how the sensors turn the image into horizontal/vertical pixels without interpolating.

On July 29, 2005 Fujifilm announced cameras with "5th Generation Super CCD HR sensors", the FinePix S5200 (S5600) and FinePix S9000 (S9500). The FinePix F10 and F11 were released later in 2005.

In 2006 Fuji introduced the 6th generation of the Super CCD sensor (size 1/1.7", 6.3 million effective pixels, except for the F40fd which has size 1/1.6", 8.3 million effective pixels). This sensor allows for acceptable image quality even at ISO 800. It is built into the FinePix S6500fd (2006) bridge camera and the FinePix F-series F30, F20 (2006), F31fd and F40fd (2007) compact cameras, all of which are widely accredited for their class leading low-light capabilities.

In late 2007 the 7th generation was introduced (size 1/1.6", 12 million effective pixels). Included in Fuijfilm FinePix F50fd (2007). This sensor, although sharp, has significantly decreased ISO performance compared to earlier generations, dropping in quality to average level. When compared to the 6th generation sensor, the individual pixel area on the 7th generation sensor is approximately 1.7× lower, considerably reducing the amount of light reaching each pixel. In mid-2008 the 8th generation was introduced (same size 1/1.6", 12 million effective pixels), included in Fujifilm FinePix F100fd (2008). This sensor improves slightly on the previously lost ISO performance, but does still not seem to compare with the 6th generation sensors.

Comparison of color filter array layouts

Conventional Bayer filter

SuperCCD

SuperCCD EXR

In September 2008 Fujifilm announced a new type of Super CCD sensor, the Super CCD EXR. This sensor aims at combining the advantages of the HR and SR sensor types in a single chip. It uses a new color filter array layout that allows for binning (combining) of pixels of the same color. This sensor is used in the F200EXR, F70EXR and F80EXR point-and-shoot cameras and the S200EXR bridge camera. Both the F200EXR and the S200EXR use the same 12 Megapixel 1/1.6" size sensor while the F70EXR and F80EXR use a 10 Megapixel and 12 Megapixel 1/2" sensor respectively.

In 2010, Fujifilm released its final cameras with the Super CCD sensor, the F300EXR and the Z800EXR. Both use the same 1/2" 12 Megapixel SuperCCD EXR sensor with hybrid autofocus system. The camera uses the conventional contrast detection AF and also Phase detection AF by means of dedicated pixels to calculate focus. According to Fujifilm, this system was as fast or faster than a DSLR. In 2011, Fujifilm switched to backside illuminated (BSI) CMOS sensors with conventional square photosite Bayer color pattern array as well as Fujifilm's EXR color filter array that used square photosites that were rotated 45 degrees. This marked the end of the SuperCCD production.

== See also ==
- Charge-coupled device
