= Nikon D3000 =

2009 APS-C digital single-lens reflex camera

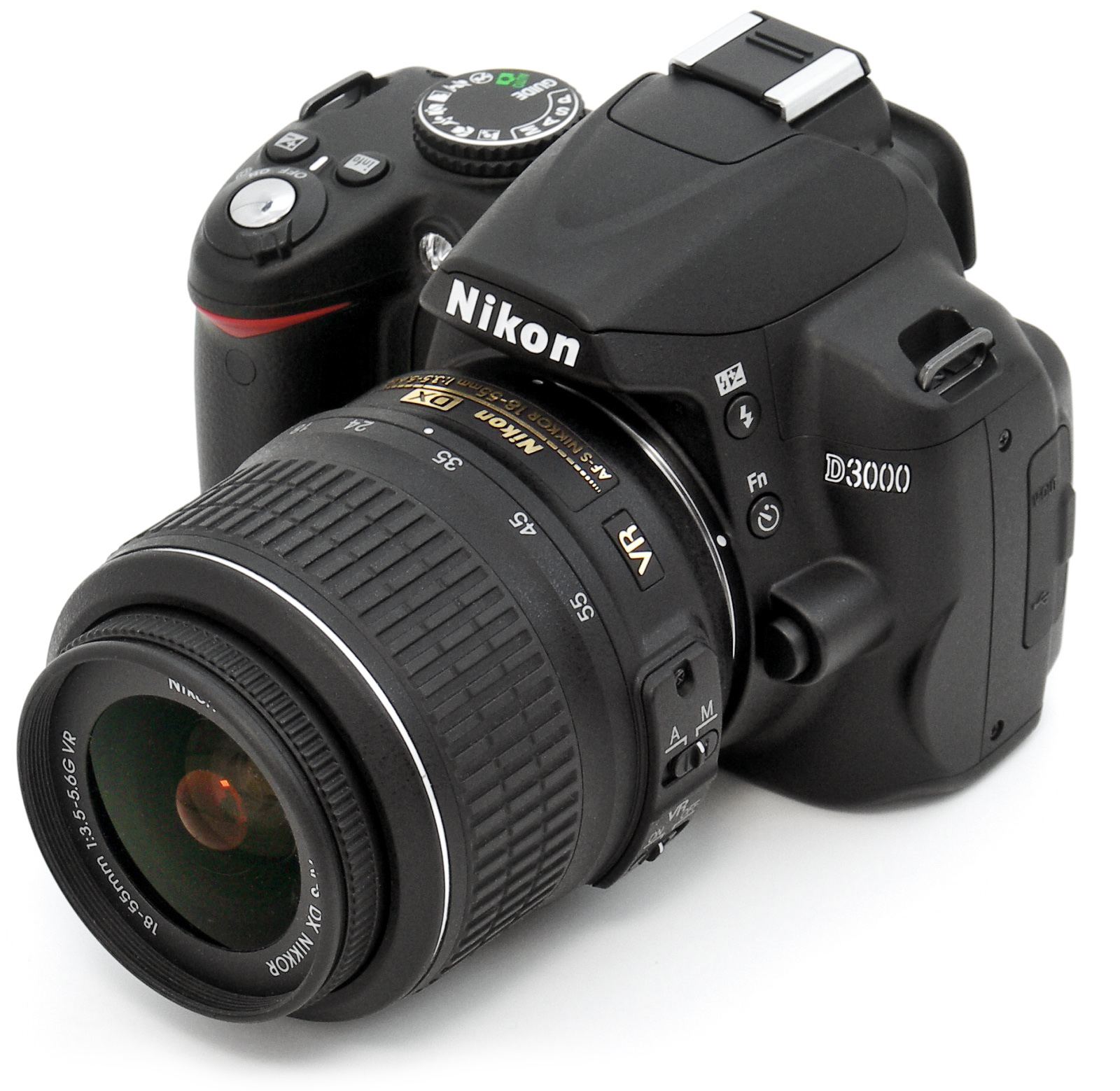
- Nikon D3000 with the Nikon 18-55mm zoom lens.

Overview
- Maker: Nikon
- Type: Digital single-lens reflex

Lens
- Lens mount: Nikon F-mount
- Lens: Interchangeable, Nikon F-mount

Sensor/medium
- Sensor: 23.6 mm × 15.8 mm Nikon DX format RGB CCD sensor, 1.5 × FOV crop
- Maximum resolution: 3,872 × 2,592 (10.2 effective megapixels)
- Film speed: 100–1600 in 1/3 EV steps, up to 3200 as high-boost
- Recording medium: Secure Digital, SDHC compatible

Focusing
- Focus modes: Instant single-servo (AF-S); continuous-servo (AF-C); auto AF-S/AF-C selection (AF-A); manual (M)
- Focus areas: 11-area AF system, Multi-CAM 1000 AF Sensor Module

Exposure/metering
- Exposure modes: Auto modes (auto, auto [flash off]), Guide Mode, Advanced Scene Modes (Portrait, Landscape, Sports, Close-up, Night Portrait), programmed auto with flexible program (P), shutter-priority auto (S), aperture-priority auto (A), manual (M), (Q) quiet mode.
- Exposure metering: TTL 3D Color Matrix Metering II metering with a 420-pixel RGB sensor
- Metering modes: 3D Color Matrix Metering II, Center-weighted and Spot

Flash
- Flash: Built in Pop-up, Guide number 13m at ISO 100, Standard ISO hotshoe, Compatible with the Nikon Creative Lighting System
- Flash bracketing: 2 or 3 frames in steps of 1/3, 1/2, 2/3, 1 or 2 EV

Shutter
- Shutter: Electronically-controlled vertical-travel focal-plane shutter
- Shutter speed range: 30 s to 1/4000 s in 1/2 or 1/3 stops and Bulb, 1/200 s X-sync
- Continuous shooting: 3 frame/s

Viewfinder
- Viewfinder: Optical 0.80x, 95% Pentamirror

Image processing
- Image processor: Expeed
- White balance: Auto, Incandescent, Fluorescent, Sunlight, Flash, Cloudy, Shade, Kelvin temperature, Preset

General
- LCD screen: 3.0-inch 320×240 pixel (QVGA) TFT-LCD
- Battery: Nikon EN-EL9a rechargeable Lithium-Ion battery
- Weight: Approx. 485 g (1.069 lb) without battery, memory card or body cap
- Made in: Thailand

Chronology
- Successor: Nikon D3100

The Nikon D3000 is a 10.2-megapixel DX format DSLR Nikon F-mount camera announced by Nikon on 30 July 2009. It replaced the D40 as Nikon's entry level DSLR. It features a 3.0-inch 230,000-dot resolution LCD monitor, CCD sensor with ISO 100–1600 (3200 with Boost) and 3D tracking Multi-CAM1000 11-point AF system which makes it quite similar to the Nikon D200 in these main parts. Initially priced with $899 MSRP, actual prices are much lower.

The D3000 was superseded by the D3100 on August 19, 2010. The D3000 is the final Nikon DSLR to use a CCD sensor.

== Features ==
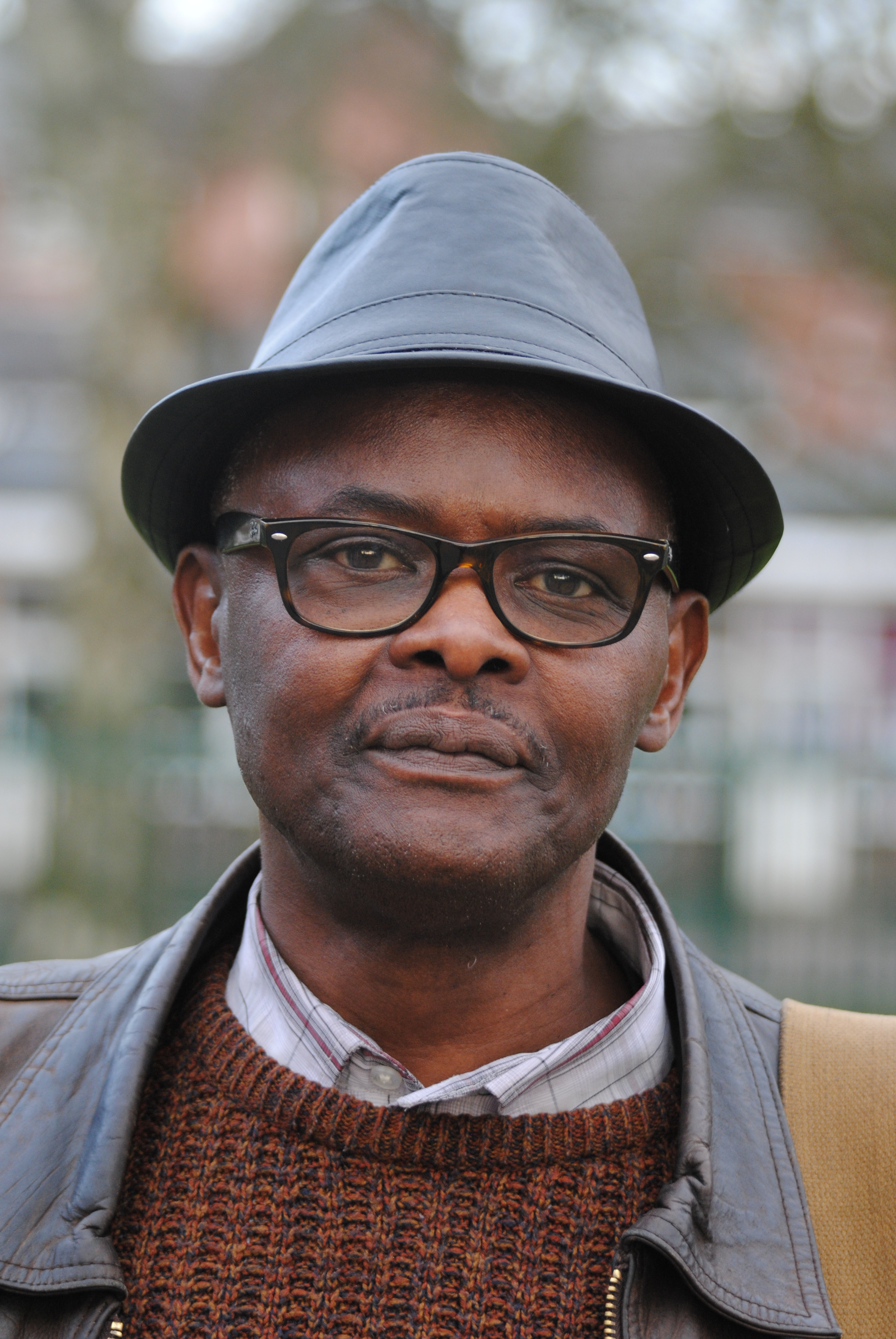
Portrait of Vanley Burke taken with a D3000

- Nikon's 10.2-megapixel Nikon DX format CCD sensor.
- Nikon EXPEED image processor.
- Camera assisted "Guide" mode.
- Active D-Lighting.
- Sensor cleaning.
- 3.0-inch 230,000-dot resolution fixed TFT LCD
- Continuous Drive up to 3 frames per second.
- 3D Color Matrix Metering II with Scene Recognition System.
- 3D Tracking Multi-CAM 1000 autofocus sensor module with 11 AF points.
- ISO sensitivity 100 to 1600 (3200 with boost).
- Nikon F-mount lenses.
- i-TTL flash exposure system without built-in wireless control.
- File formats: JPEG, NEF (Nikon's RAW, 12-bit compressed)
- SD and SDHC memory card file storage.

Like the Nikon D40, D40x, D60 and D5000, the D3000 has no in-body autofocus motor, and fully automatic autofocus requires a lens with an integrated autofocus-motor. With any other lenses the camera's electronic rangefinder can be used to manually adjust focus.

Can mount unmodified A-lenses (also called Non-AI, Pre-AI or F-type) with support of the electronic rangefinder and without metering.

== Reception ==
Reviews of Nikon D3000 have been generally positive, noting that the image quality of the D3000 is comparable to more expensive 10-megapixel cameras, while recognizing certain weaknesses such as the lack of live view and HD movie capabilities or movie capabilities in general.

Image noise compared to the Canon EOS 1000D / Rebel XS and Sony a230 was rated best in terms of remaining details by Cameralabs.

== See also ==
- List of Nikon F-mount lenses with integrated autofocus motors

Sensor	Class	1999	2000	2001	2002	2003	2004	2005	2006	2007	2008	2009	2010	2011	2012	2013	2014	2015	2016	2017	2018	2019	2020	2021	2022	2023	2024	2025	2026
FX (Full-frame)	Flagship											D3X ^{−P}																	
FX (Full-frame)	Flagship										D3 ^{−P}		D3S ^{−P}		D4		D4S		D5^{T}					D6^{T}					
FX (Full-frame)	Professional											D700 ^{−P}			D800/D800E			D810/D810A			D850 ^{AT}								
FX (Full-frame)	Enthusiast																Df												
FX (Full-frame)	Enthusiast																	D750 ^{A}					D780 ^{AT}						
FX (Full-frame)	Enthusiast															D600	D610												
DX (APS-C)	Flagship		D1^{−E}	D1X^{−E}				D2X^{−E}		D2Xs^{−E}																			
DX (APS-C)	Flagship		D1^{−E}	D1H ^{−E}			D2H^{−E}	D2Hs^{−E}																					
DX (APS-C)	Professional				D100^{−E}				D200^{−E}		D300^{−P}		D300S^{−P}						D500 ^{AT}										
DX (APS-C)	Enthusiast						D70^{−E}		D70s^{−E}	D80^{−E}		D90^{−E}		D7000 ^{−P}			D7100	D7200			D7500 ^{AT}								
DX (APS-C)	Upper-entry								D50^{−E}	D40X^{−E*}	D60^{−E*}		D5000^{A−P*}		D5100^{A−P*}	D5200^{A−P*}	D5300^{A*}	D5500^{AT*}		D5600 ^{AT*}									
DX (APS-C)	Entry-level									D40^{−E*}			D3000^{−E*}	D3100^{−P*}		D3200^{−P*}	D3300^{*}			D3400^{*}		D3500^{*}							
Early models		SVC (prototype; 1986); QV-1000C (1988); NASA F4 (1991); E2/E2S (1995); E2N/E2NS (1996); E3/E3S (1998)																											
Sensor	Class																												
Sensor	Class	1999	2000	2001	2002	2003	2004	2005	2006	2007	2008	2009	2010	2011	2012	2013	2014	2015	2016	2017	2018	2019	2020	2021	2022	2023	2024	2025	2026
