= Nikon AF-S Nikkor 50mm f/1.8G =

AF-S Nikkor 50mm f/1.8G
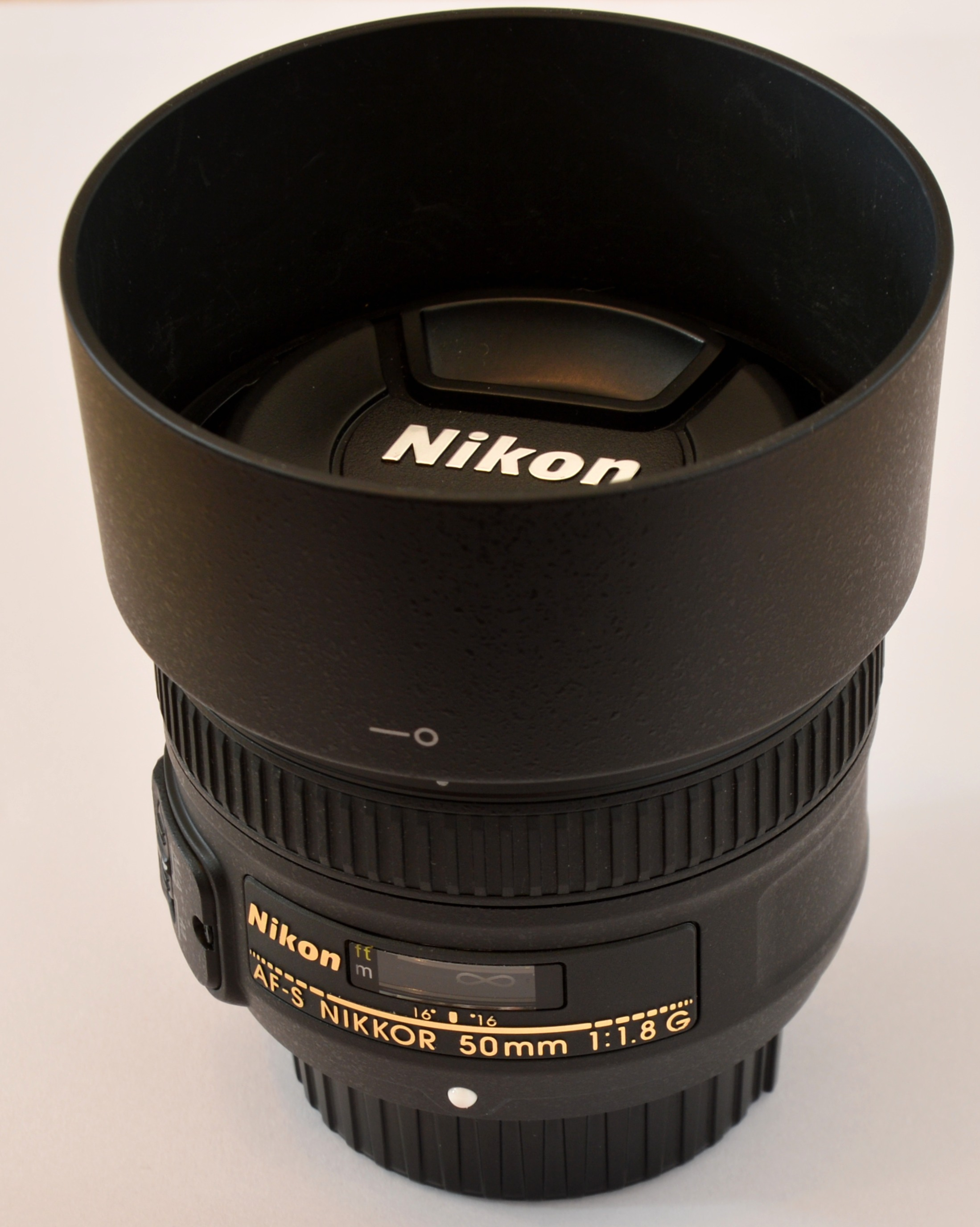
- Maker: Nikon
- Lens mount: F-mount

Technical data
- Type: Prime
- Focus drive: Silent wave motor
- Focal length: 50 mm
- Image format: FX (full-frame)
- Aperture (max/min): f/1.8–16
- Close focus distance: 0.45 m
- Max. magnification: 0.15x (1:5.25)
- Diaphragm blades: 7 (rounded)
- Construction: 7 elements in 6 groups

Features
- Lens-based stabilization: No No
- Macro capable: No No
- Aperture ring: No No

Physical
- Max. length: 52.5 mm
- Diameter: 72 mm
- Weight: 185 g
- Filter diameter: 58 mm

Accessories
- Lens hood: HB-47
- Case: CL-1013

History
- Introduction: April 2011
- Predecessor: Nikon AF Nikkor 50 mm f/1.8D

Nikon AF-S Nikkor 50mm f/1.8G is a prime lens introduced by Nikon Corporation in April 2011. The lens is compatible with FX sized sensors as well as DX format. The lens generally received positive reviews. It is the successor of the Nikon AF Nikkor 50 mm f/1.8D.

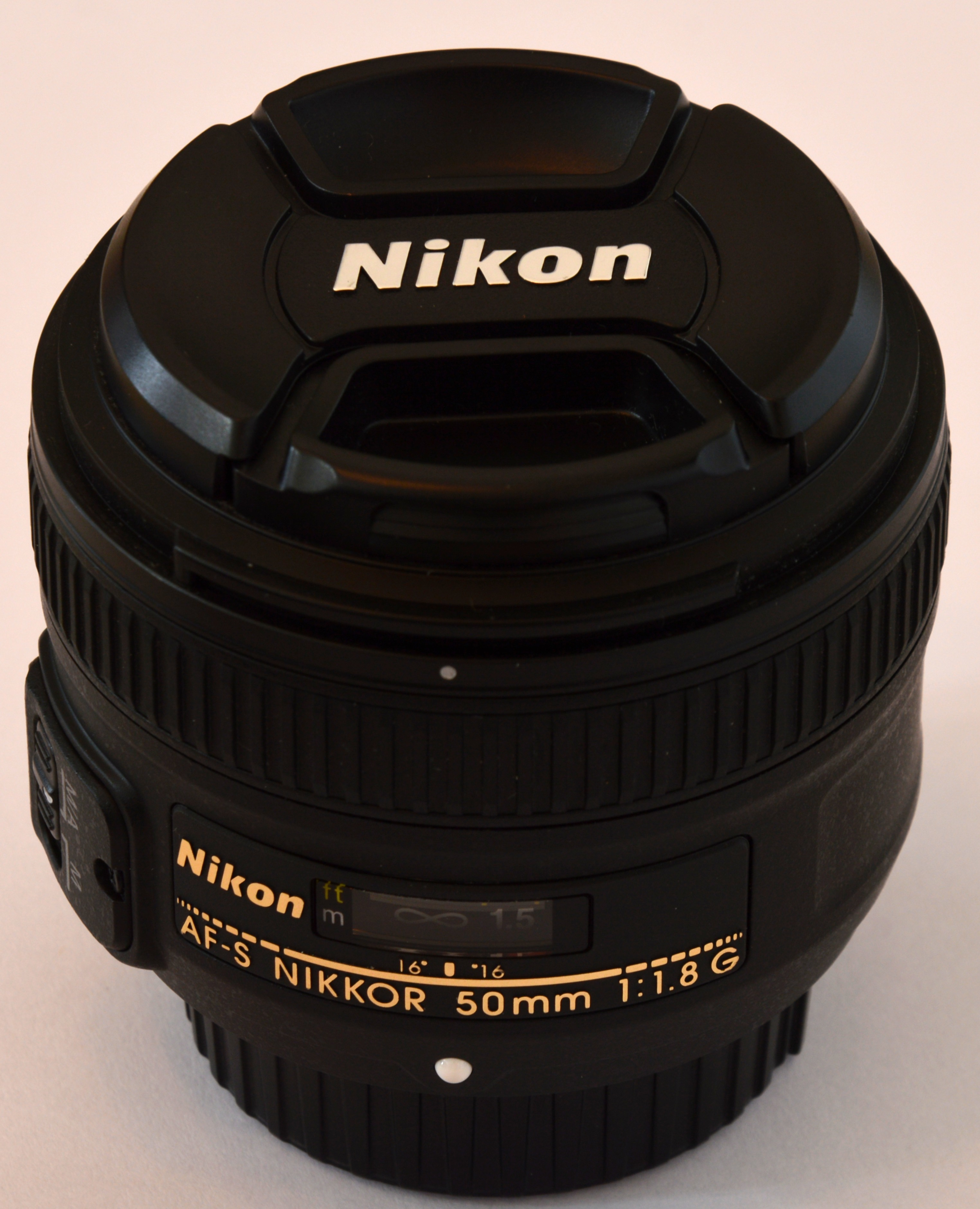
The lens without lens hood HB-47

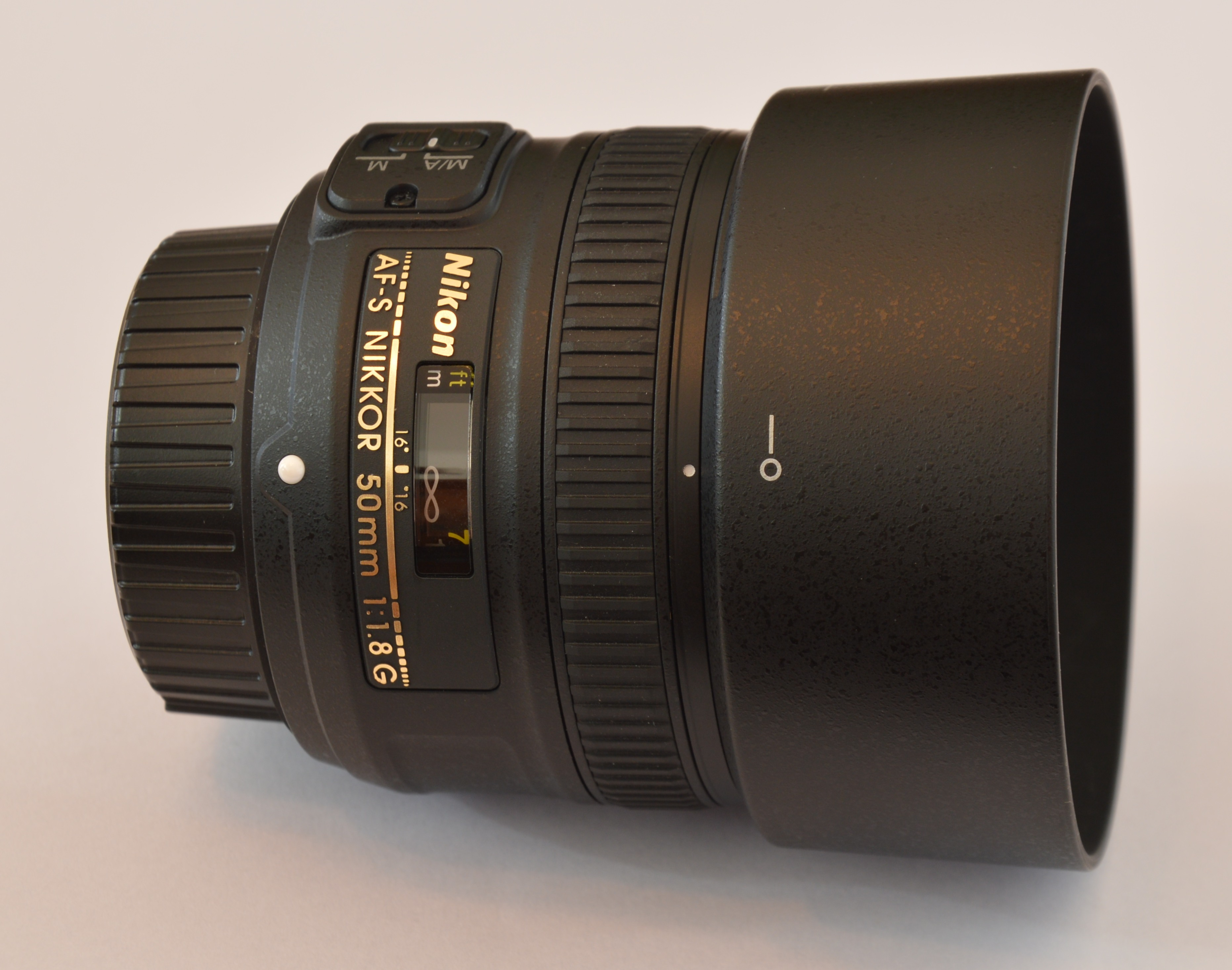

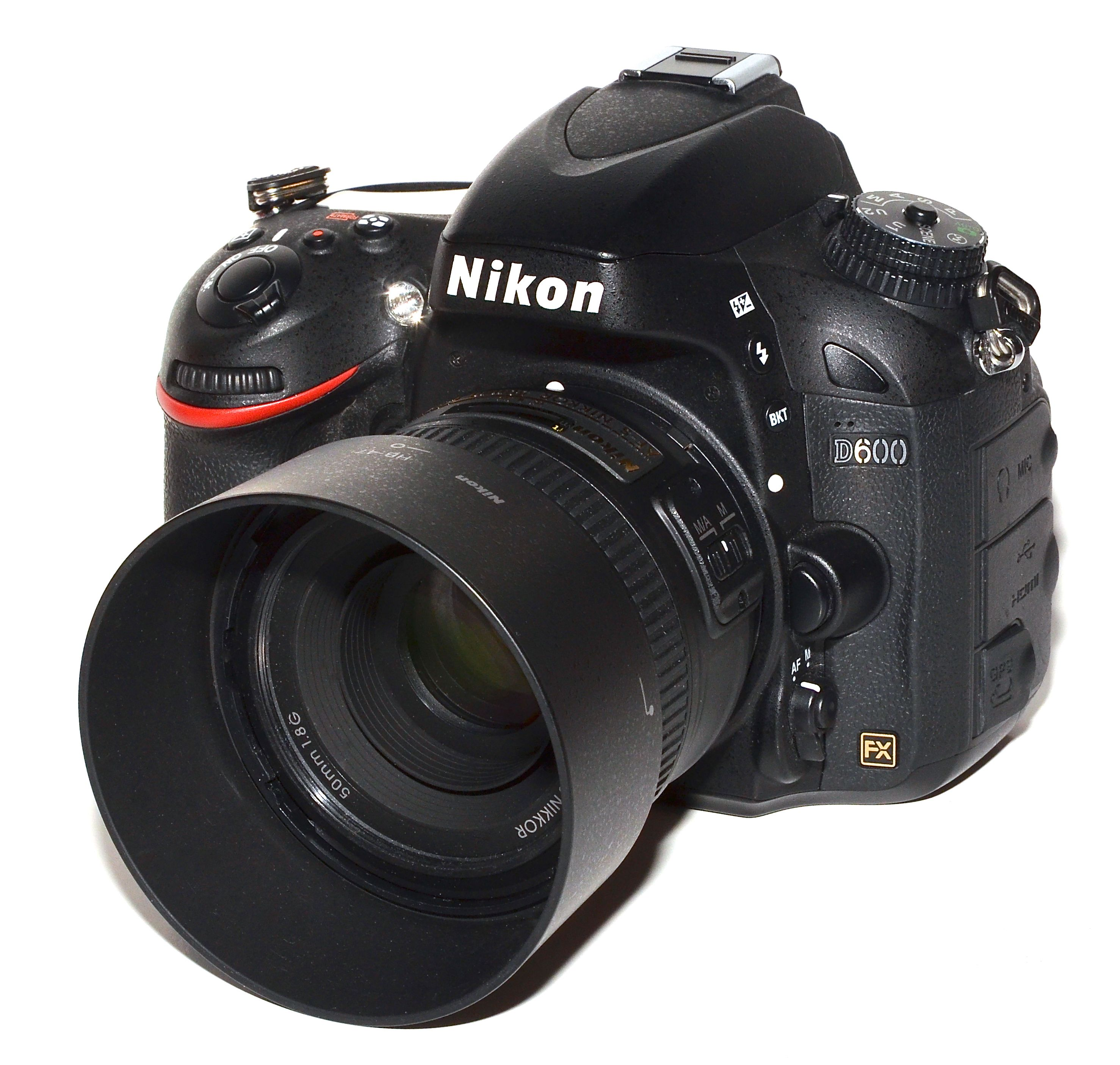
On a Nikon D600
