= Nikon AF Nikkor 50 mm f/1.8D =

AF Nikkor 50mm f/1.8D
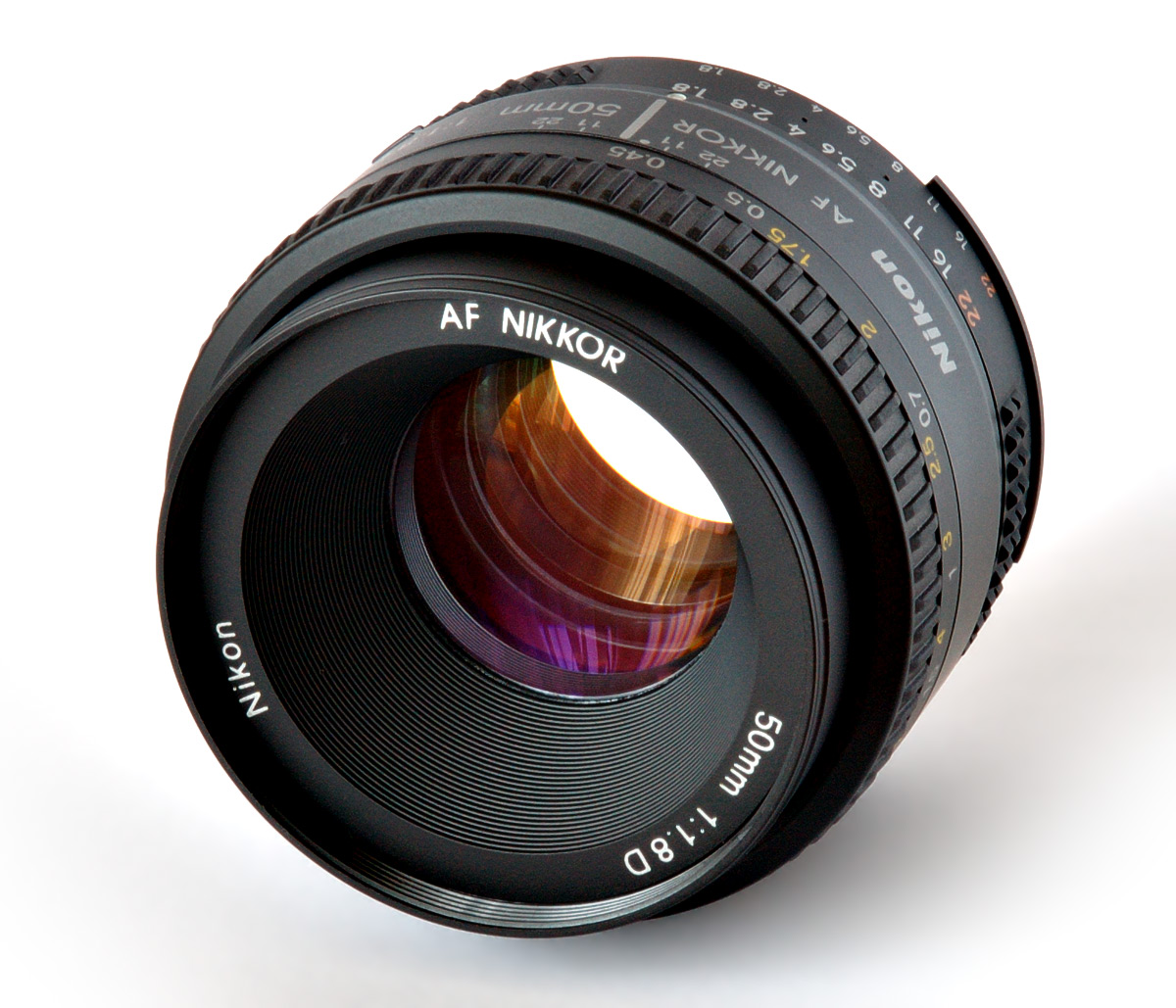
- Maker: Nikon
- Lens mount: F-mount

Technical data
- Type: Prime
- Focus drive: Screw drive
- Focal length: 50mm
- Image format: FX (full-frame)
- Aperture (max/min): f/1.8–22
- Close focus distance: 0.45m
- Max. magnification: 1:6.6
- Diaphragm blades: 7 (straight)
- Construction: 6 elements in 5 groups

Features
- Lens-based stabilization: No No
- Macro capable: No No
- Aperture ring: Yes Yes
- Application: Normal Lens

Physical
- Max. length: 39 mm
- Diameter: 63.5mm
- Weight: 155 g
- Filter diameter: 52mm

Accessories
- Lens hood: HR-2
- Case: CL-30S

Angle of view
- Diagonal: 46°

History
- Introduction: 2002
- Successor: Nikon AF-S Nikkor 50mm f/1.8G

Retail info
- MSRP: 110.00 USD

The Nikon 50 mm f/1.8D AF Nikkor is one of Nikon's 50 mm lenses. This Double-Gauss lens replaces the 50mm f/1.8 (non-D). A 50 mm prime lens is the normal lens for the 135 film format.

== Introduction ==
This lens was introduced on February 21, 2002.

On a Nikon DX format DSLR, a 50 mm lens is cropped to the angle of a view of a short telephoto lens (~75 mm equivalent; field-of-view crop is 1.54). Prime lenses can be cheaper and easier to manufacture than zoom lenses, and may have better optical characteristics compared with zoom lenses of comparable price. The combination of low cost and high optical quality makes this a popular lens among many photographers. This lens can be used with both the FX and the DX cameras. When used on DX format cameras, the resulting angle of view along with its large aperture also make it a lens suitable for portraiture.

Being an F-mount lens, it will mount as well as meter on all Nikon DSLRs. The lack of an internal autofocus motor means that this lens cannot utilize its autofocus capabilities on entry-level camera bodies such as the D40, D60, D3000, D5000, D3100 or D5100; however, a newer version of the same lens, the Nikon AF-S Nikkor 50mm f/1.8G, will autofocus successfully on these cameras. With a reverse coupler, one can also reverse mount this lens on to a camera or reverse mount it in front of another lens to use it for macro shots, although it is a procedure not recommended by Nikon.

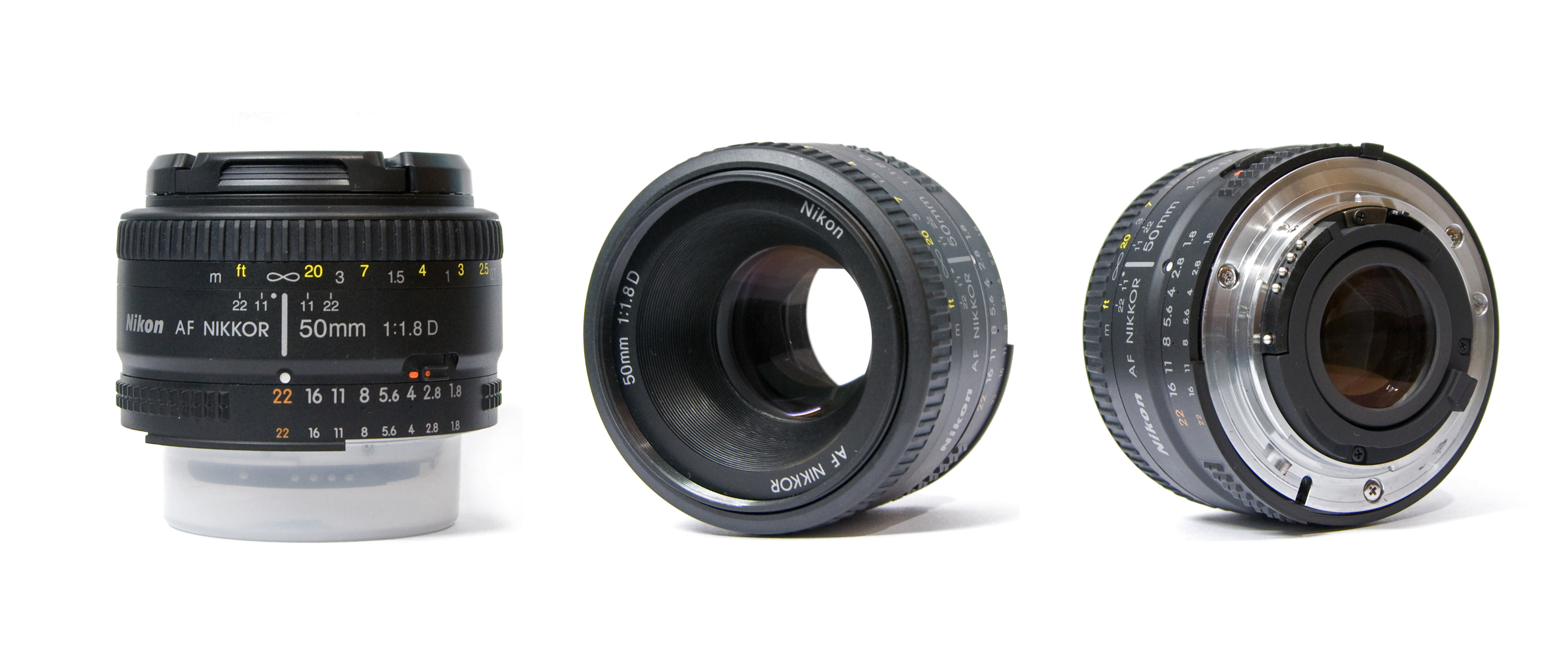
AF NIKKOR 50mm f/1.8D

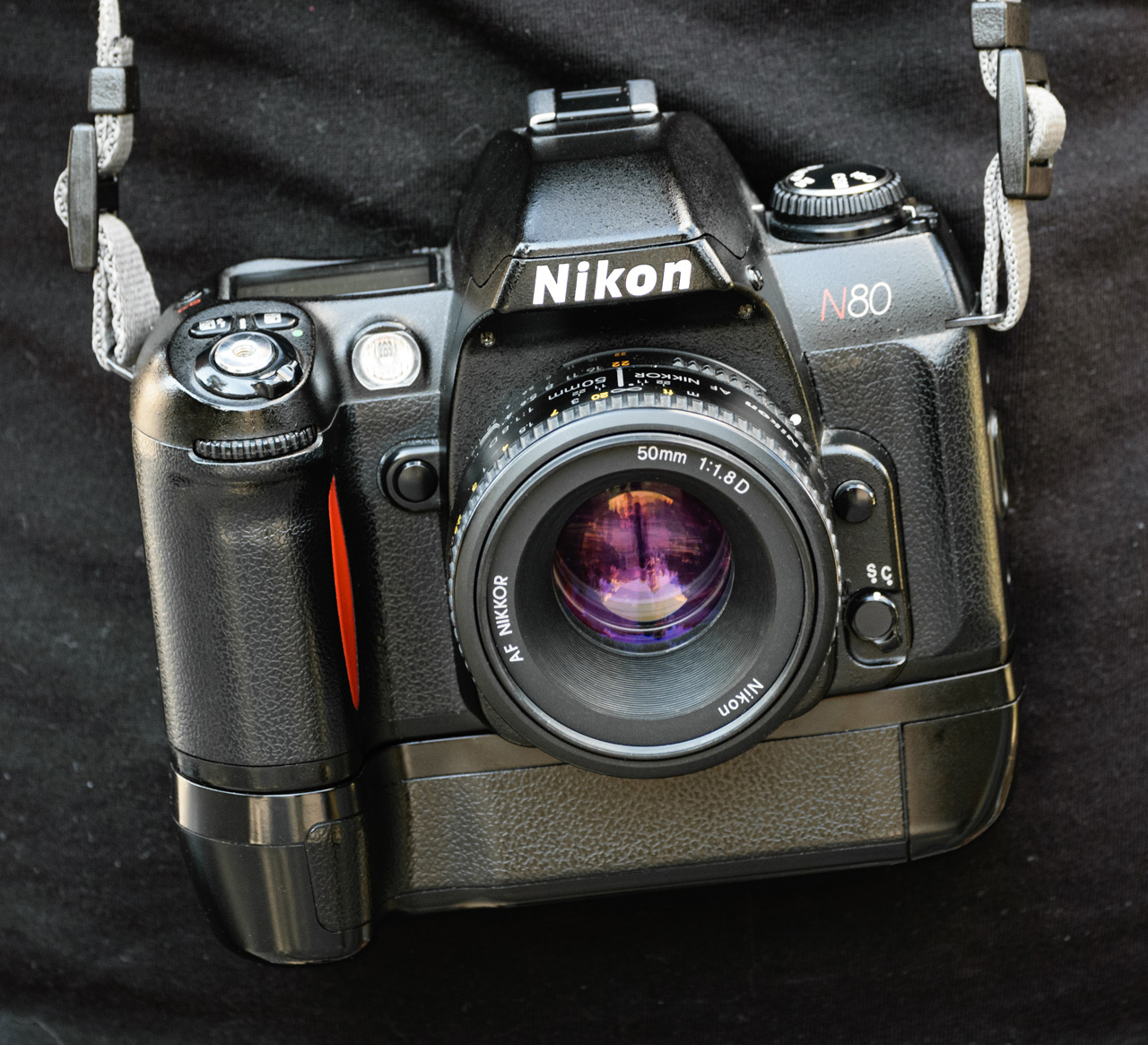
AF NIKKOR 50mm f/1.8D on a Nikon F80 (N80)
