= Nikon AF-S DX Zoom-Nikkor 18-55mm f/3.5-5.6G =

Camera lens

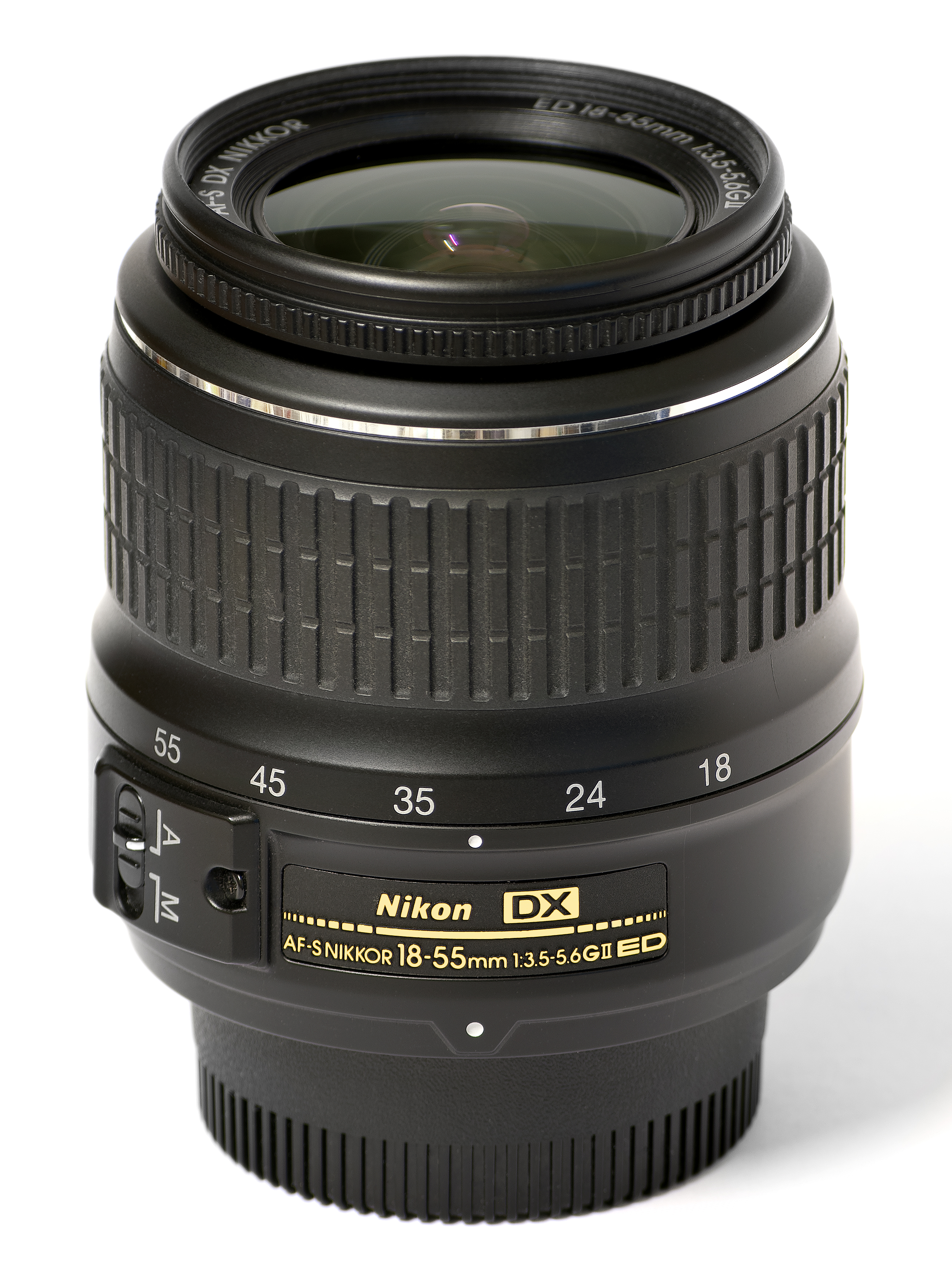
AF-S Nikkor 18-55 f/3.5-5.6G ED II

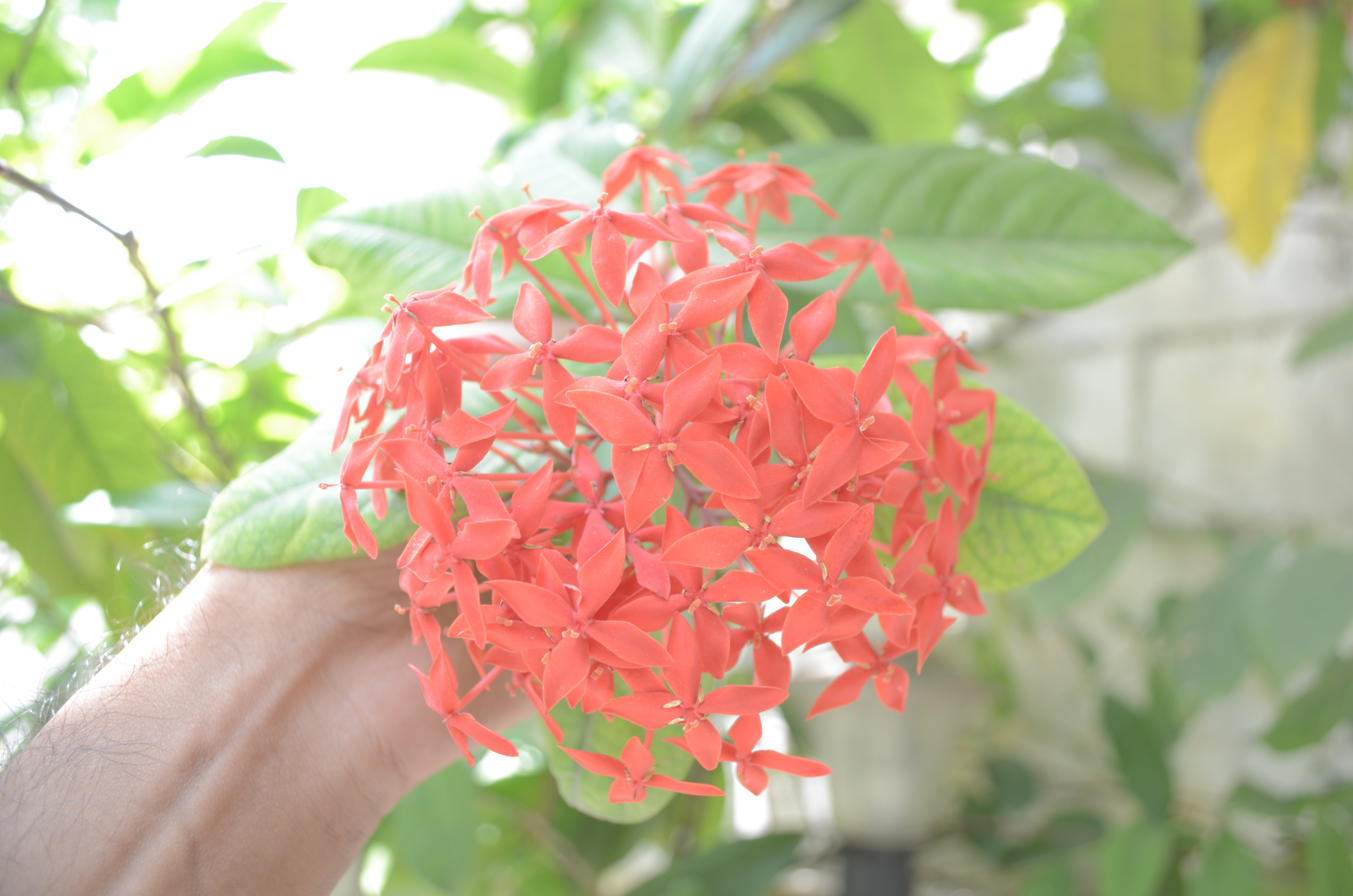
Uncropped and unedited image from Nikon D5100 using an AF-S DX Nikkor 18-55mm f/3.5-5.6G VR. Taken at f/3.5 at daytime without flash. 1/50 sec, ISO 200, 18 mm, auto WB.

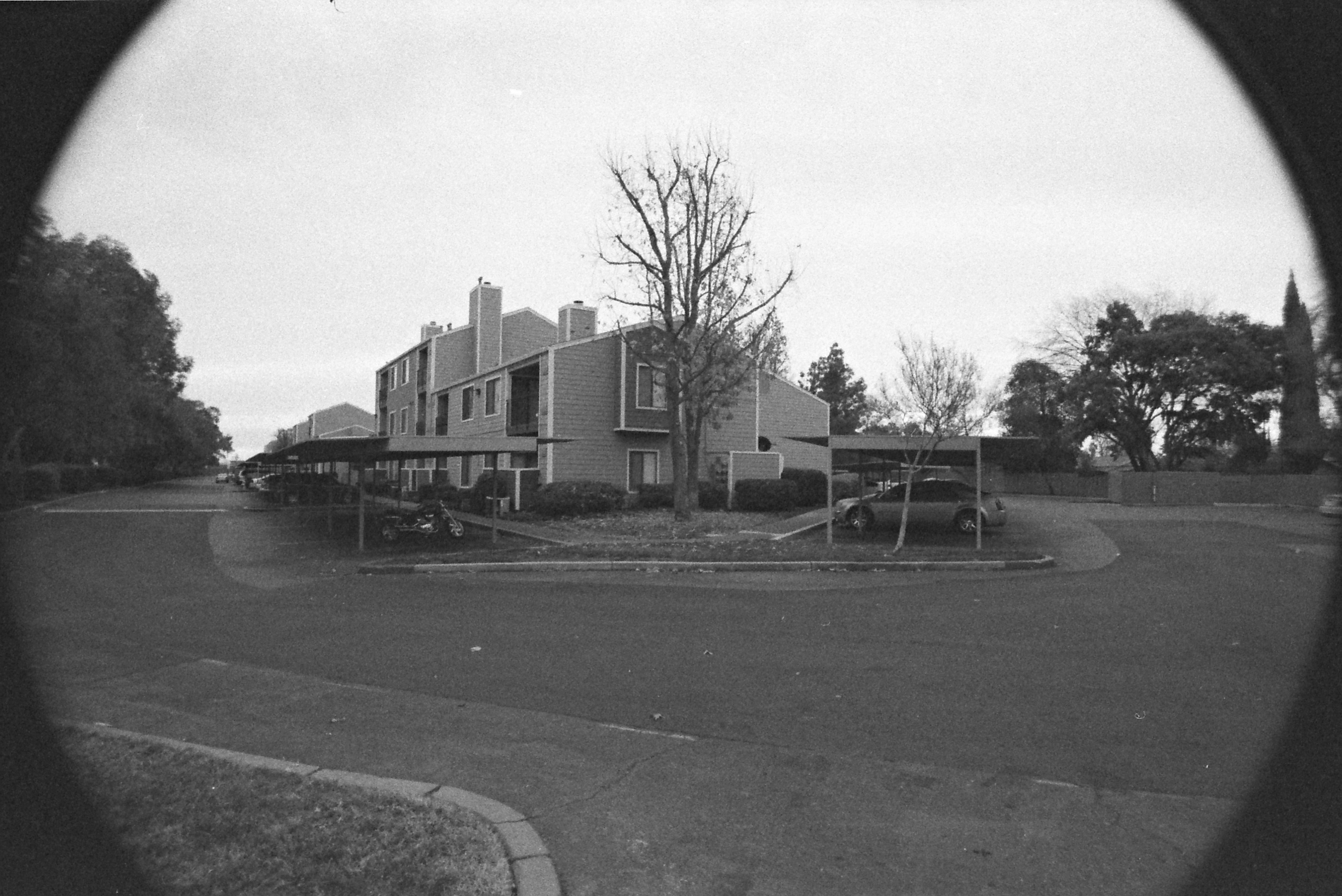
Vignetting occurs when this lens is used on a 35mm film camera or on a full-frame/FX-format digital camera. Shot taken with the 18-55mm f/3.5-5.6G VR at 18 mm, at f/36, mounted on a Nikon F2.

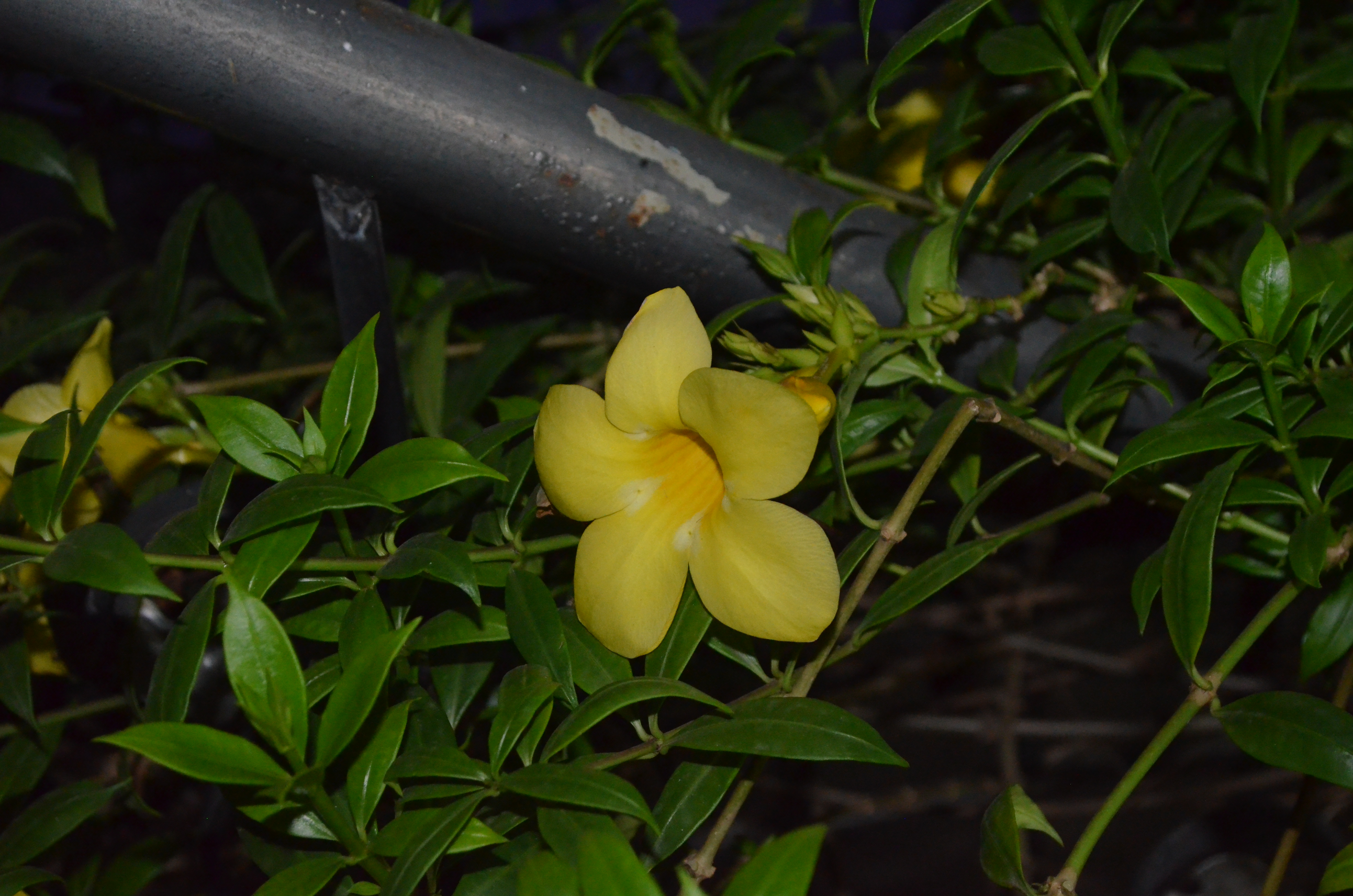
Uncropped and unedited image from Nikon D5100 using an AF-S DX Nikkor 18-55mm f/3.5-5.6G VR. Taken at f/5.6 at night time with flash. 1/60 sec, ISO 3200, 55 mm, auto WB.

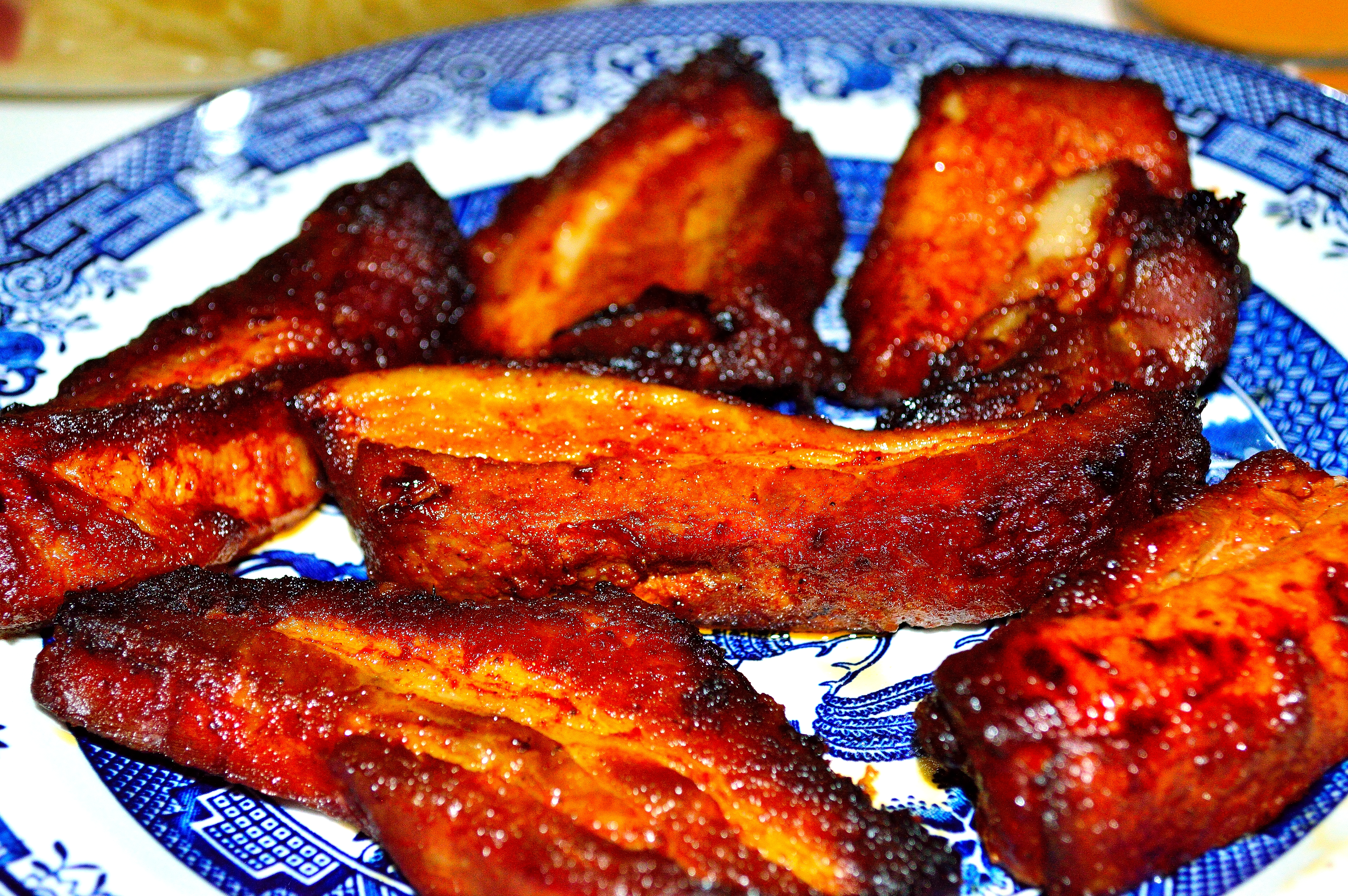
Uncropped, edited image of a British roasted pork dish. Taken on a Nikon D3200 using the AF-S DX Nikkor 18-55mm f/3.5-5.6G VR. Taken at f/5. 1/60 sec, ISO 400, focal length 36 mm, with flash, VR on.

The 18-55mm f/3.5-5.6G AF-S Zoom-Nikkor lens is a midrange zoom lens manufactured by Nikon for use on Nikon F-mount DX format digital SLR cameras. Often included as a kit lens on entry-level DSLRs, it also can be purchased separately from the camera body. Nikon first introduced the lens in 2005 and has provided five subsequent updates. The last two iterations have AF-P type autofocusing with a stepper motor, while all others use an SWM autofocus motor. Following are the six variants as of 2024:

- AF-S DX Nikkor 18-55mm f/3.5-5.6G ED, released in 2005
- AF-S DX Nikkor 18-55mm f/3.5-5.6G ED II, released in 2006.
- AF-S DX Nikkor 18-55mm f/3.5-5.6G VR, released in 2007.
- AF-S DX Nikkor 18-55mm f/3.5-5.6G VR II, released in 2014.
- AF-P DX Nikkor 18-55mm f/3.5-5.6G, released in 2016.
- AF-P DX Nikkor 18-55mm f/3.5-5.6G VR, released in 2016.

Note: VR means Vibration Reduction as used in Nikon Lenses. IS means Image Stabilization as used in Canon Lenses. VR (Nikon) and IS (Canon) are both the same thing, but each maker uses their own acronyms.

Like all lenses in the DX format, the 18-55mm casts a smaller image circle than lenses for full-frame 35mm cameras and is therefore only compatible with cameras having APS-C-sized sensors (or vignetting will happen). However, from 24mm onward until 55mm, the image circle will cover the full 35mm frame, and is usable on film.

== Features ==
- Silent wave motor (SWM) for the first four AF-S versions, stepper motor for the AF-P versions
- Extra-low Dispersion (ED) glass element, to reduce chromatic aberration (available only on the two AF-S versions without VR)
- Two aspherical lens elements (available only on the two AF-P versions)
- Easy variant of Vibration Reduction (most recent versions only), to make lens cheaper there is no "Active" and "Normal" VR options switch here

== Construction ==
- Plastic body and mount
- 52mm filter thread for widely used 52mm filters (AF-P versions: 55mm)
- No protector from dust and moisture near mount
- Rotating front lens while focusing (not in VR II version)
- VR II version has a collapsible lens barrel, a design first used with certain lenses for Nikon's 1 mount for mirrorless interchangeable-lens cameras

(Lens construction details vary between models; see table below for specifications).

== Performance ==
Thom Hogan praised its value and optical performance, but criticized its handling, noting a diminutive focus ring that rotates during focusing, with no manual override.

== Specifications ==
Attribute	AF-S 18-55mm f/3.5-5.6G ED	AF-S 18-55mm f/3.5-5.6G ED II	AF-S 18-55mm f/3.5-5.6G VR	AF-S 18-55mm f/3.5-5.6G VR II	AF-P 18-55mm f/3.5-5.6G	AF-P 18-55mm f/3.5-5.6G VR
Autofocus	Yes AF-S				Yes AF-P	
Vibration Reduction (Image Stabilization in Canon)	No No		Yes Yes		No No	Yes Yes
Maximum aperture	f/3.5-5.6					
Minimum aperture	f/22-32	f/22-36			f/22-38	
Weight	210 g	205 g	265 g	195 g	195 g	205 g
Maximum diameter	69 mm	70.5 mm	73 mm	59.5 mm	64.5 mm	64.5 mm
Length	75 mm	74 mm	79 mm	66 mm	62.5 mm	
Filter diameter	52 mm				55 mm	
Picture angle	76° - 28°50'					
Groups/elements	5/7		8/11		9/12	
# of diaphragm blades	7					
Closest focusing distance	0.28 m				0.25 m	
Lens hood model	HB-33/HB-45		HB-45	HB-69	HB-N106	
Release date	2005	2006	2007	2014	2016	2016
MSRP $			$200	$250		

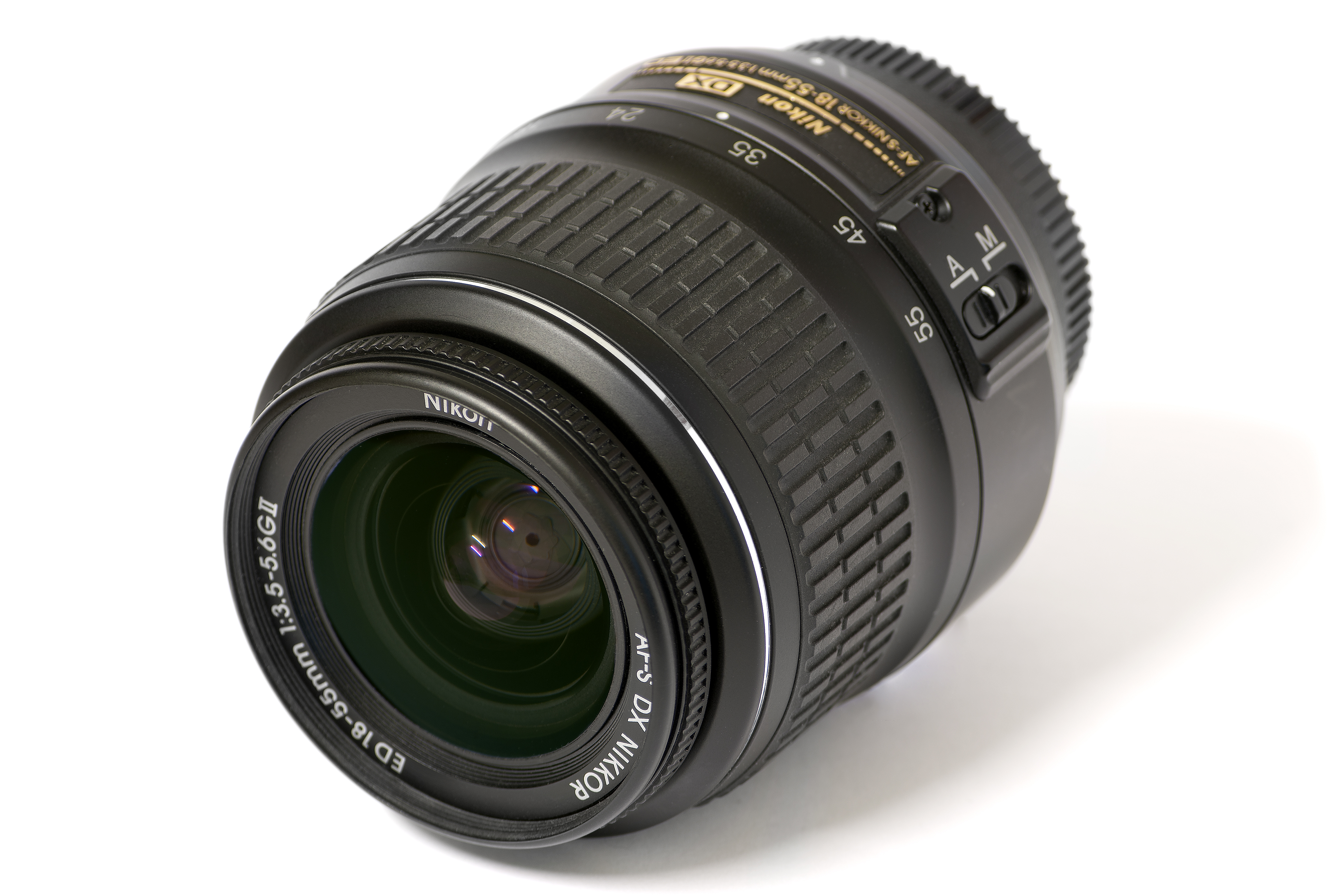
AF-S Nikkor 18-55 f/3.5-5.6G ED II, front

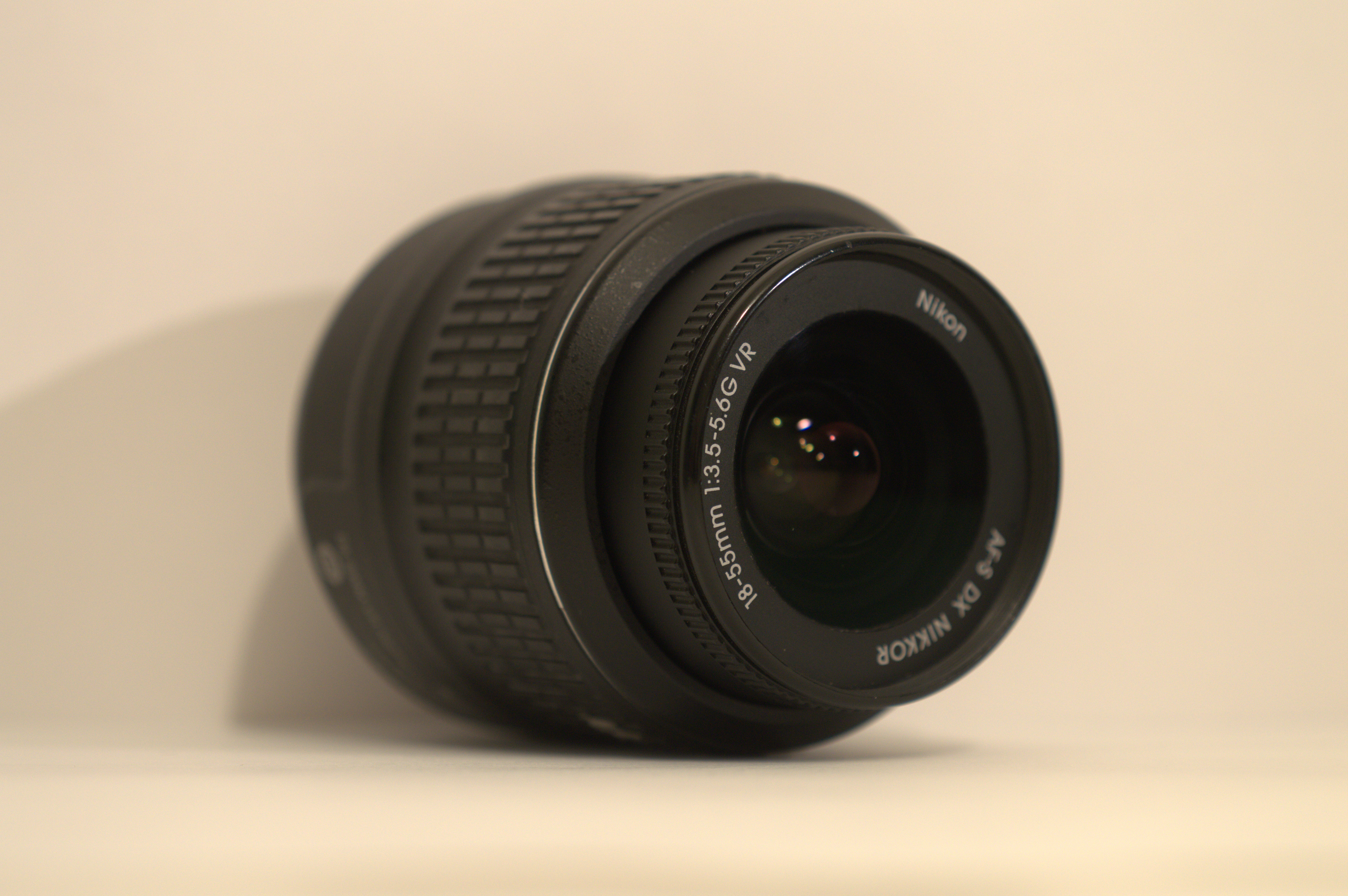
AF-S Nikkor 18-55 f/3.5-5.6G VR, front

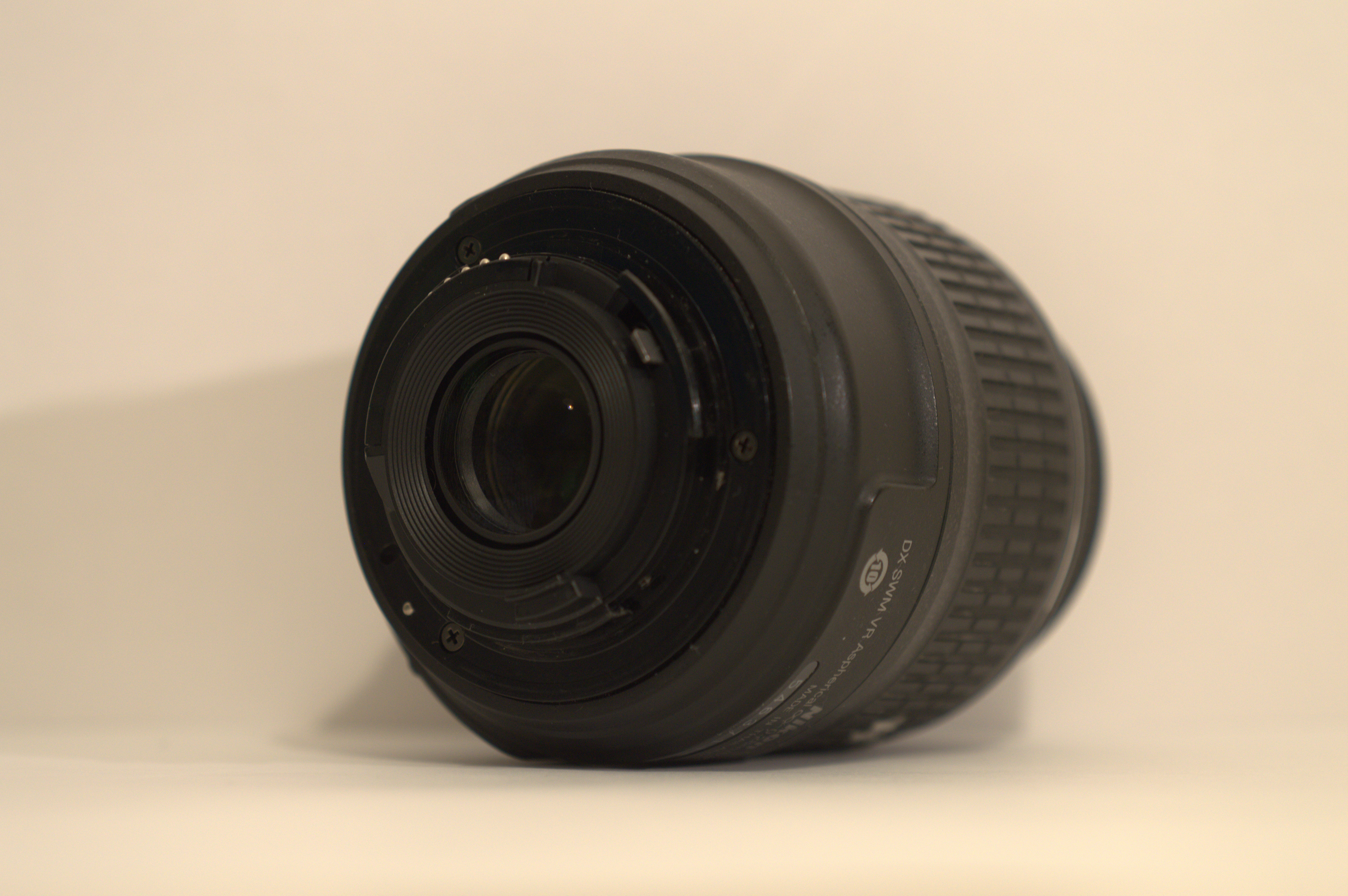
AF-S Nikkor 18-55 f/3.5-5.6G VR, back

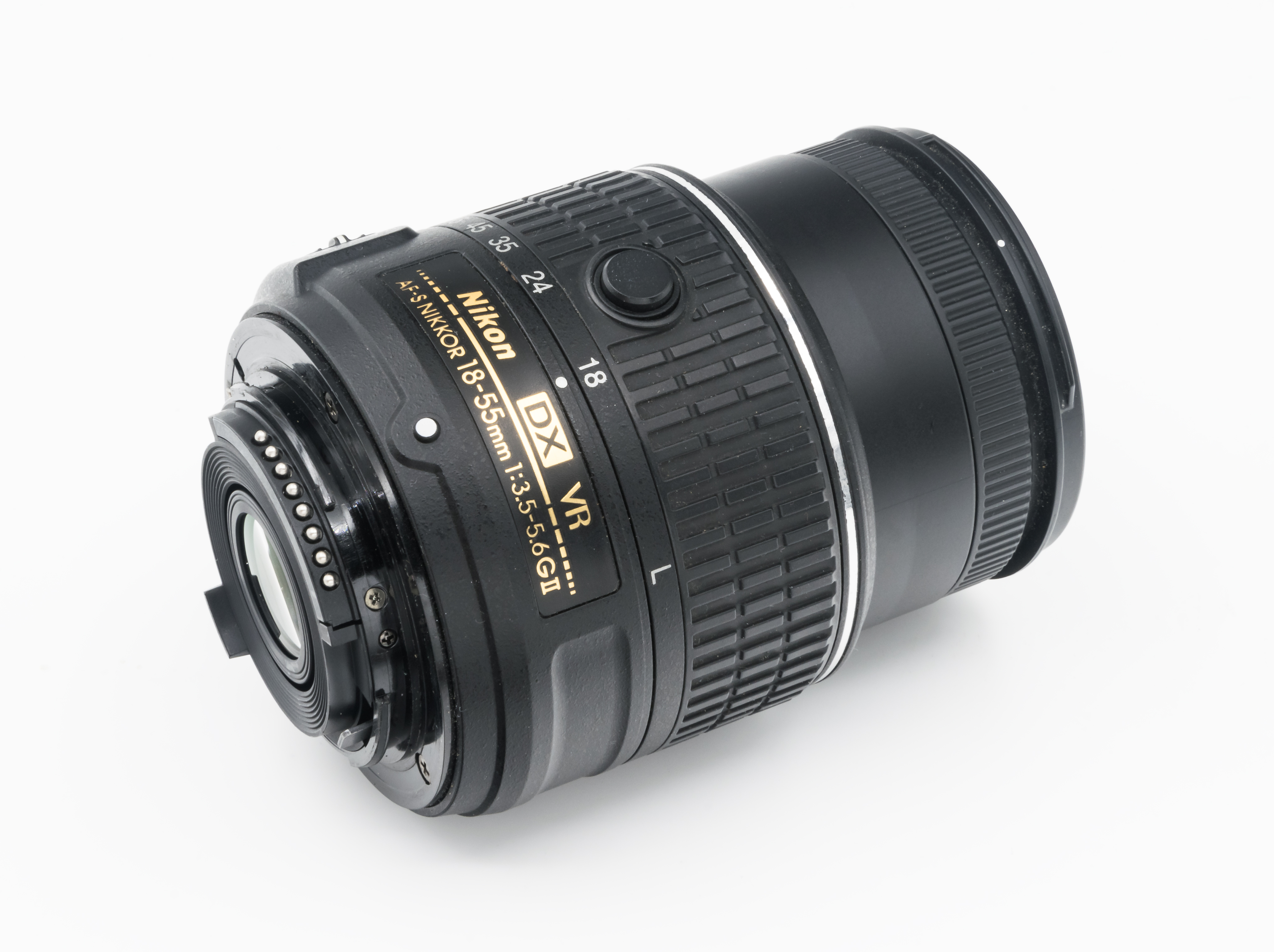
AF-S Nikkor 18-55 f/3.5-5.6G VR II

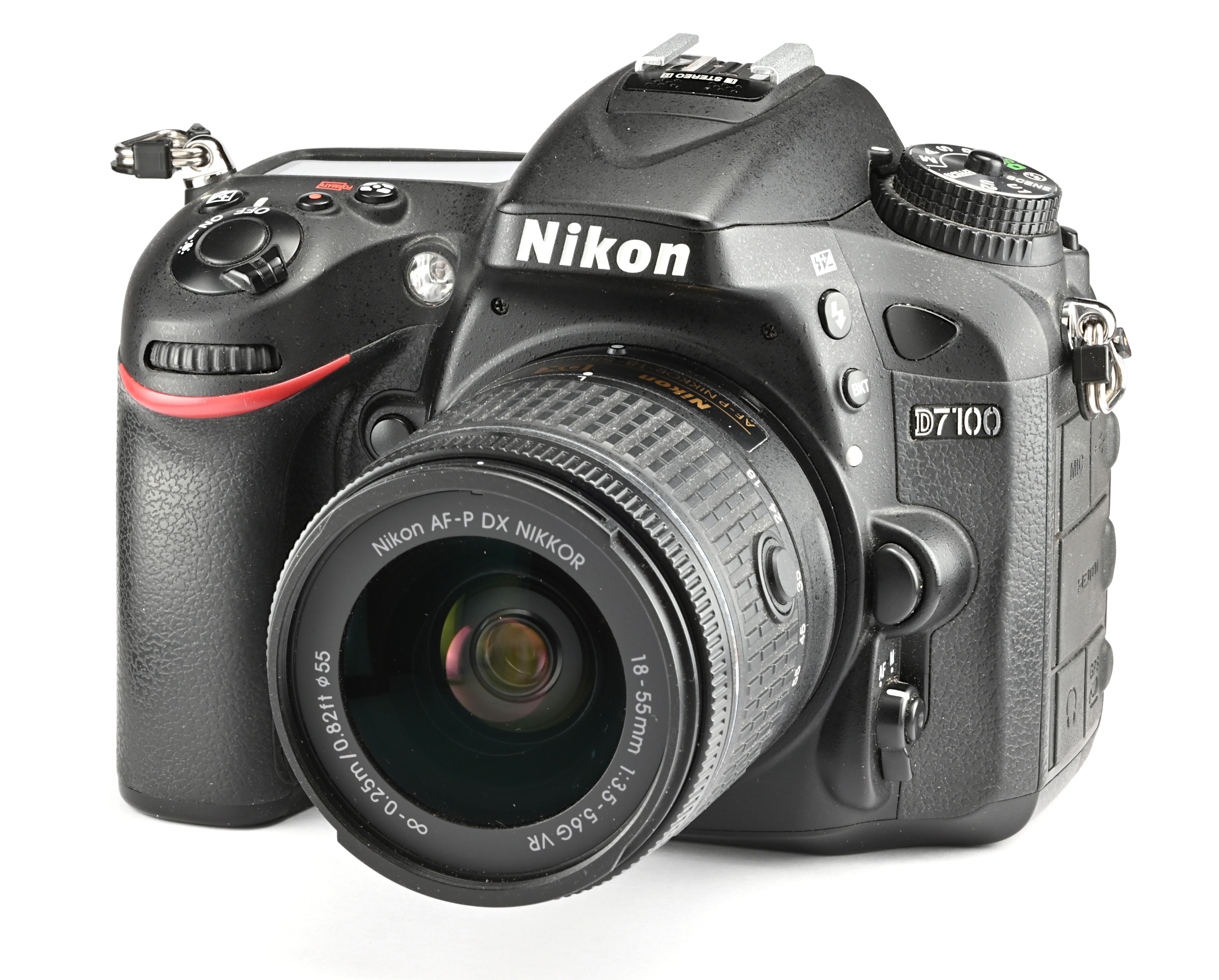
AF-P Nikkor 18-55 f/3.5-5.6G VR, front

== See also ==
- List of Nikon F-mount lenses with integrated autofocus motor
- Nikon F-mount
