= Fujifilm FinePix F series =

Digital camera line

The Fujifilm FinePix F series is a line of compact digital cameras that was known for its low-light performance in 2005, with relatively low image noise and natural colors even at high ISO settings. With its relatively large, but moderate resolution Super CCD sensors, it concentrated on image quality, and low-light shooting without flash, which was mostly restricted to prosumer models at the time.

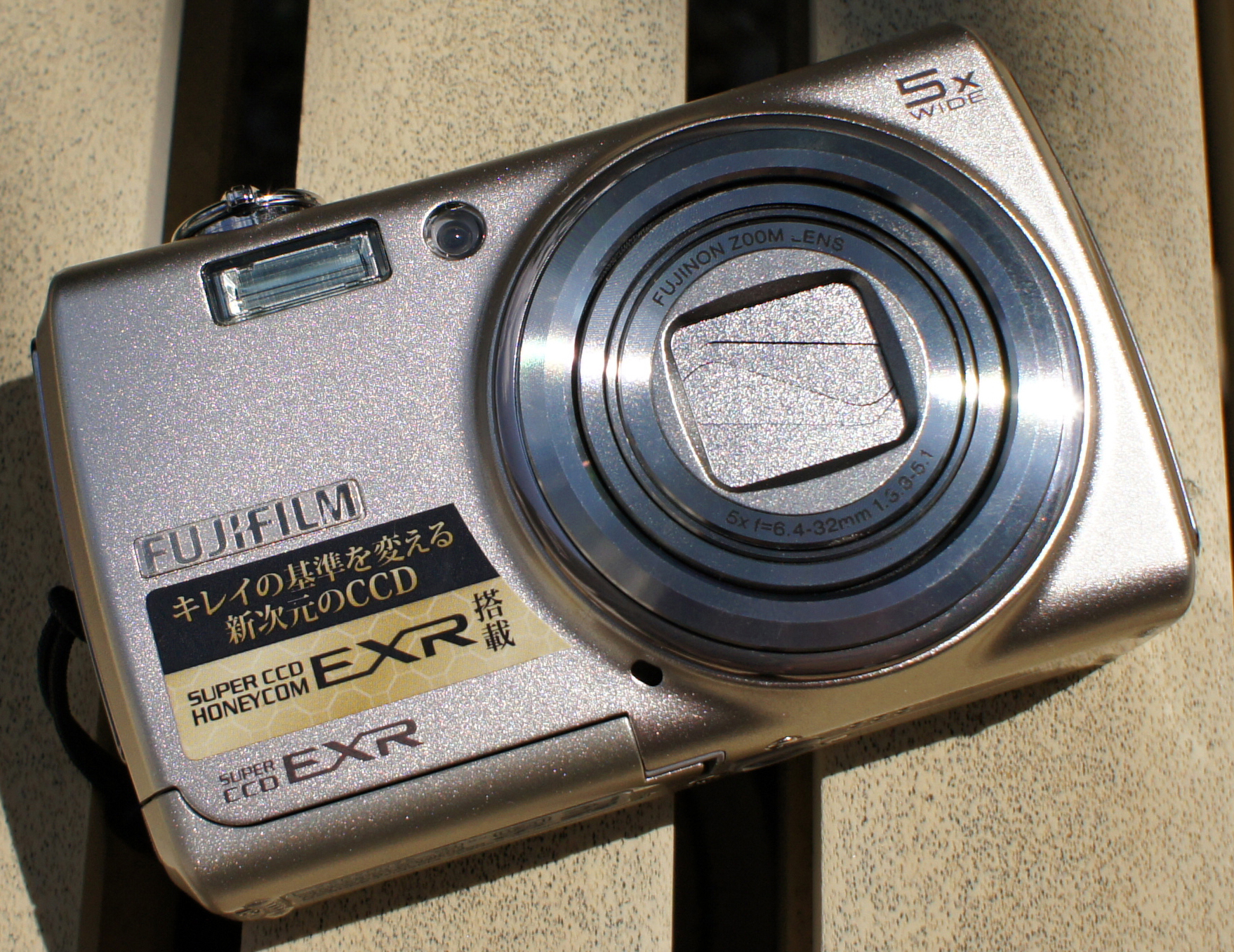
Fujifilm FinePix F200EXR

== Flagship line ==
=== F10 ===
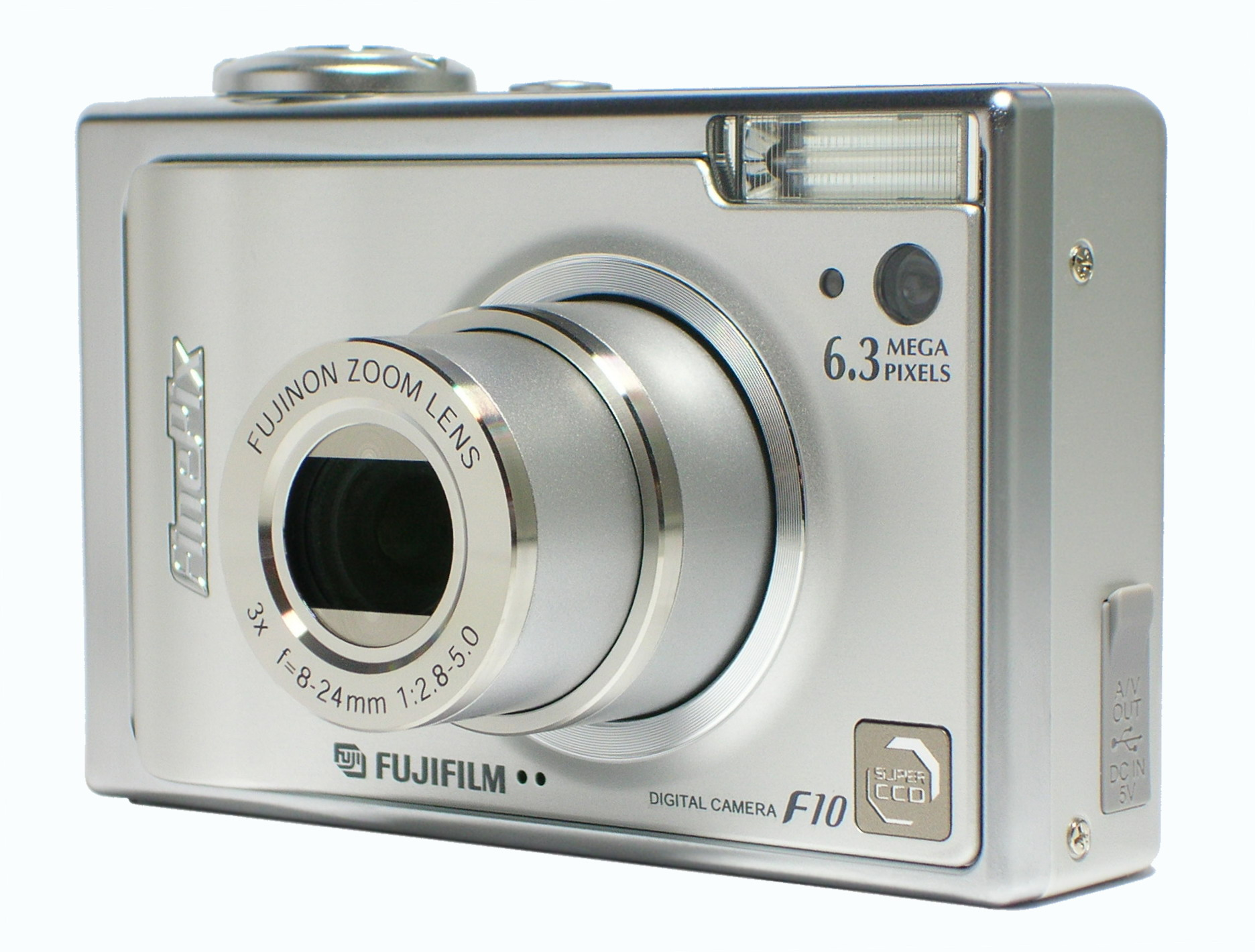
The Fuji FinePix F10

The F10 was announced in February 2005 and released April 30, 2005. The first breakthrough model of the F series, the 6.3-megapixel FinePix F10, was announced in February 2005 and became available on April 30 of that year.

=== F11 ===
The F11 received minor improvements and the addition of aperture and shutter priority modes.

=== F30 ===
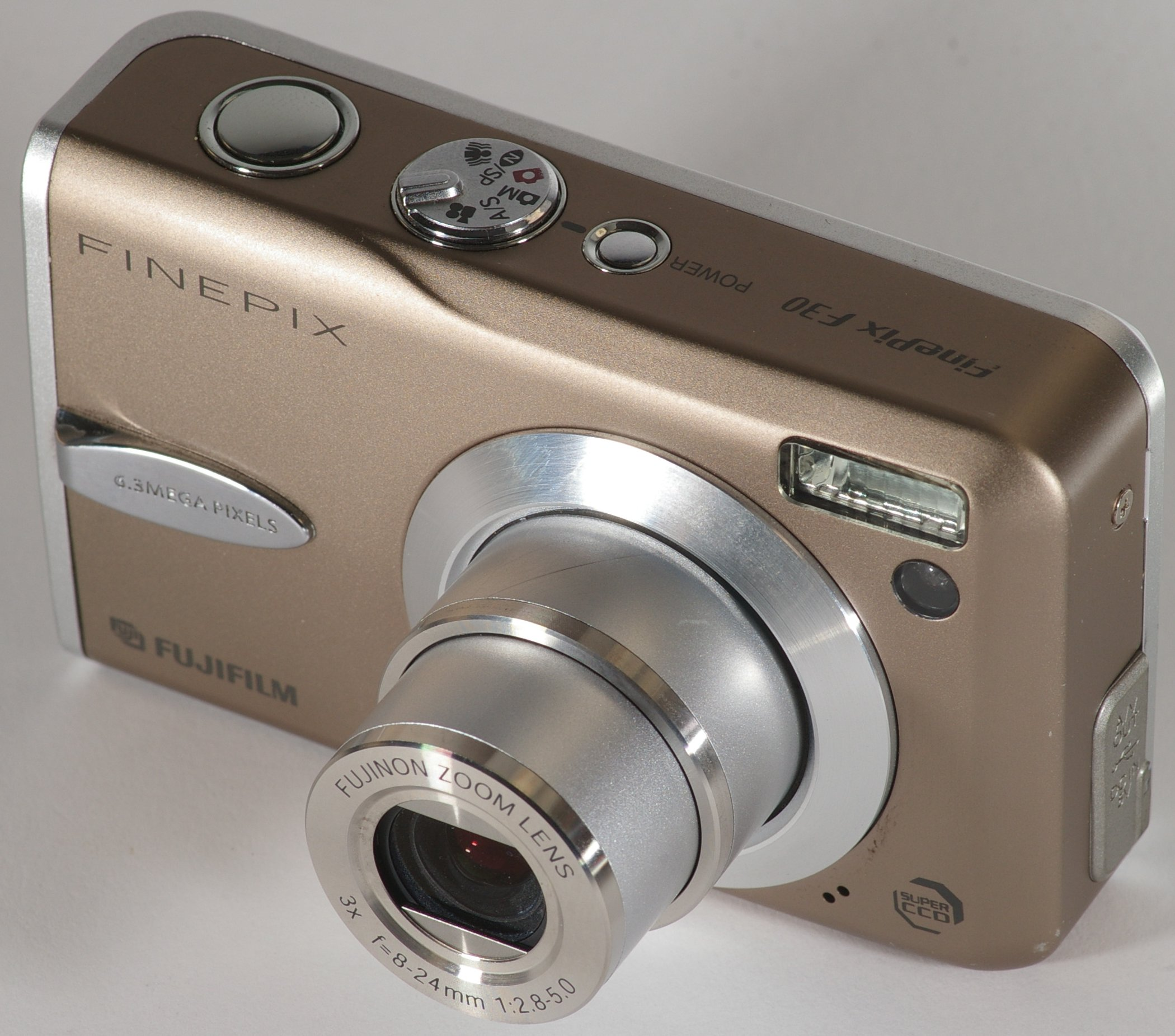
Fujifilm FinePix F30 camera

In May 2006, the F30 released with 3200 ISO. The F30 also added a higher-resolution LCD screen and new modes. It also improved battery life and the menu system.

=== F20 ===
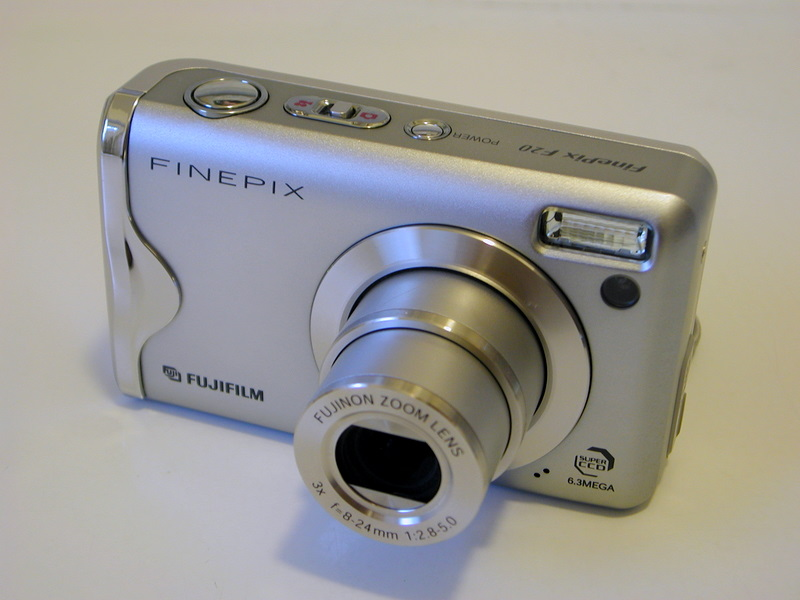
Fujifilm FinePix F20 camera

In July 2006, Fujifilm announced the F20, a scaled-down version of the F30 intended for casual use. It was also sold under the names F20SE and F20 LE.

=== F31fd ===
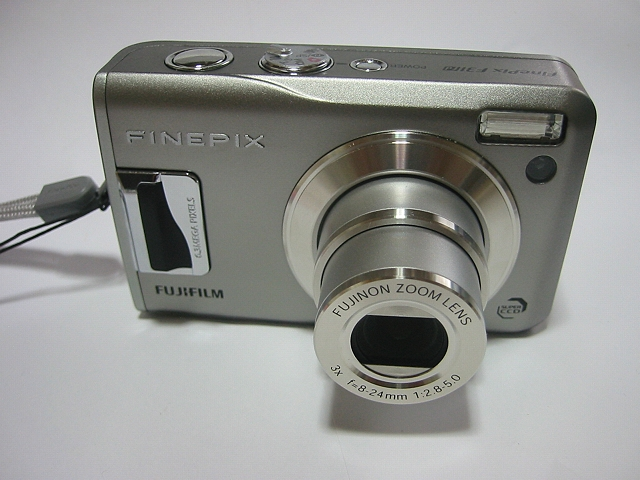
Fujifilm FinePix F31fd camera

In September 2006, the F30 was succeeded by the F31fd.

=== F40fd ===
In March 2007, Fujifilm released the F40fd, succeeding the F20. It introduced support for SD memory cards. It was also sold under the name F45fd with only cosmetic differences.

=== F47fd ===
The FinePix F47fd was identical to the F40fd, with a 9 megapixel sensor.

=== F50fd ===
On July 26, 2007, FujiFilm announced the F50fd. It succeeded the F31fd and was released in September 2007. A small number were sold under the name F50SE.

=== F100fd ===
On January 26, 2008, FujiFilm announced the F100fd. Some of the cameras had faulty "pink banding", seen on the left side of the photograph, and it was not fixed with a firmware update.

In December 2008, the F100fd won the Digital Photography Review "premium compact camera" group test.

=== F60fd ===
The Fujifilm FinePix F60fd was announced on 12 August 2008. It is almost identical to the F50fd except for a larger 3" LCD and updated firmware.

=== F200EXR ===
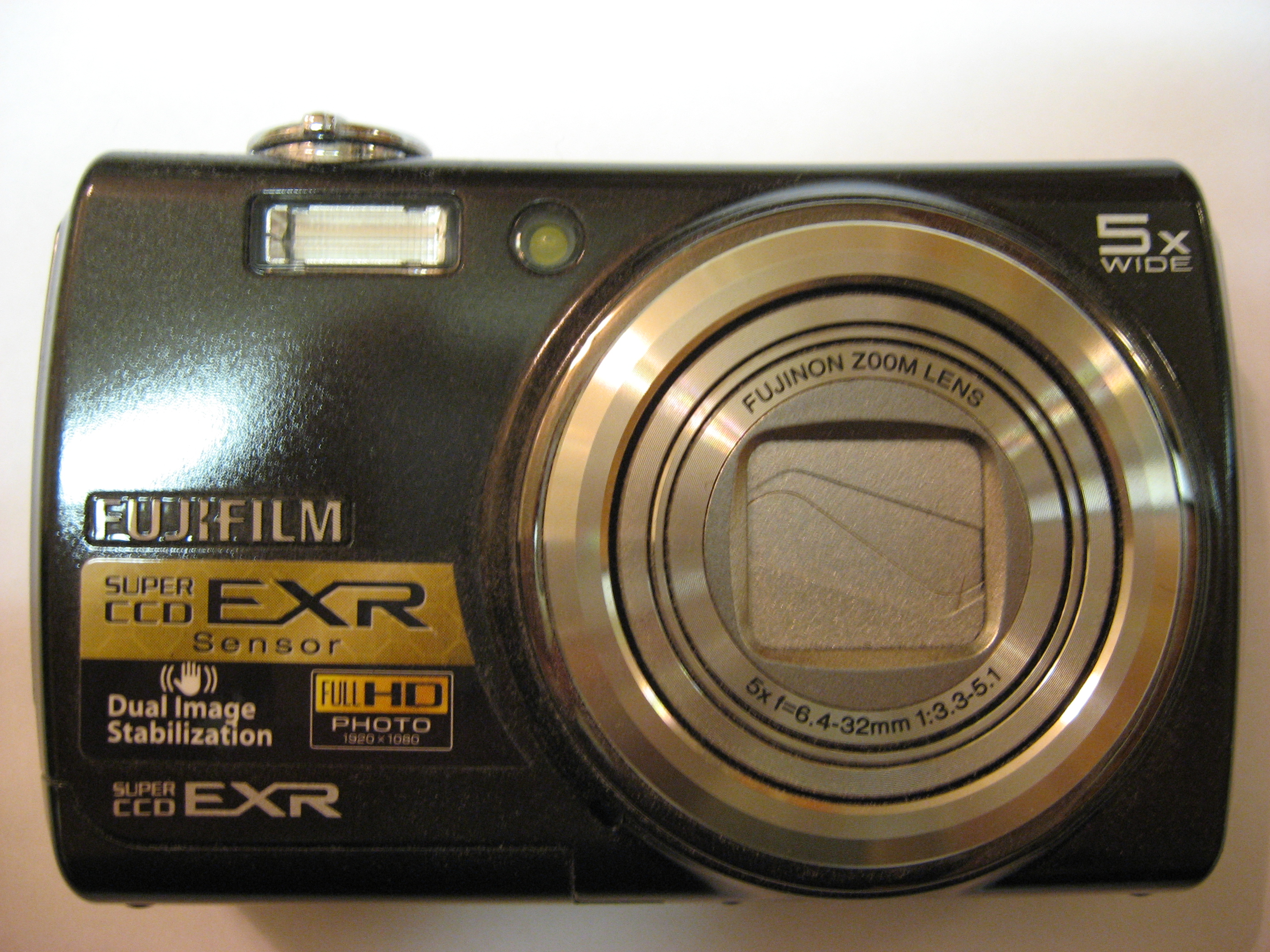
A Fujifilm FinePix F200Exr.

The F200EXR was announced on 4 February 2009. The camera offers several manual modes and automatic scene recognition.

=== F70EXR ===
The F70EXR was announced on July 22, 2009. The F72EXR is an alternate color model of the F70EXR.

=== F80EXR ===
Fujifilm announced the F80EXR on February 2, 2010.

=== F300EXR/F305EXR ===
Fujifilm announced the F300EXR in late 2010. It was the first FinePix F series to not use a large sensor and small body and was the first to support 720P video recording.

=== F500EXR ===
Fujifilm announced the F500EXR in August 2011.

=== F770EXR ===
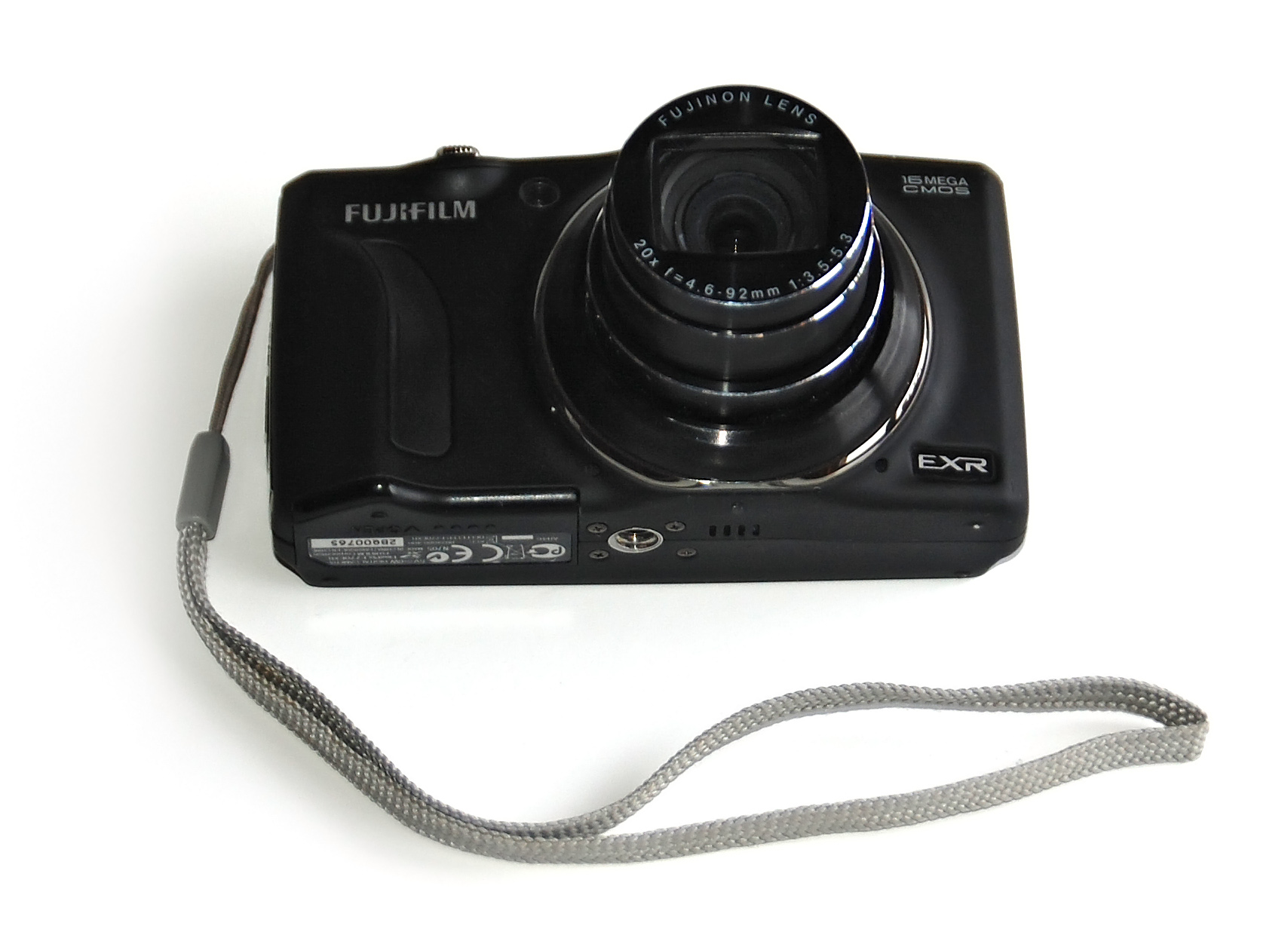
Fujifilm FinePix F770EXR

The F770EXR was released in March 2012.

=== Other models ===
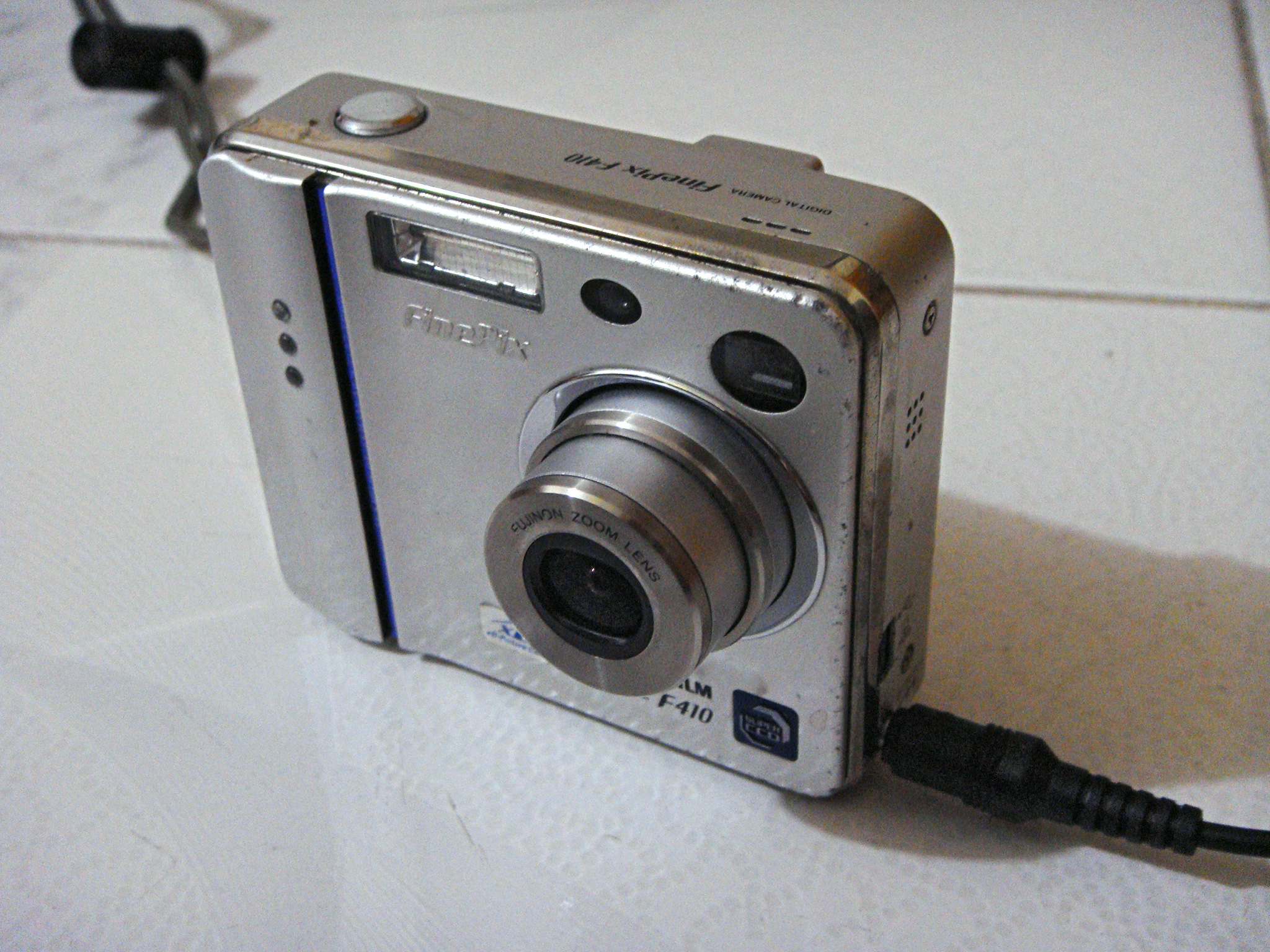
Fujifilm FinePix F410 camera

Prior to the current generation, Fujifilm released a number of cameras with the "F" designation. These included the compact, uniquely shaped F401, F402, F410, F420, F440, and F450, the larger F700 and F810, and the F601 Zoom and F610. Some of these cameras had earlier versions of the Super CCD sensor. Most of these earlier cameras did not have autofocus assist beams, and none of them had long-lasting battery life.

As of July 2006, the current F series lineup also includes two other mid-level compact cameras (the F470 and the F650), but lack most of the features of the F series.

As of August 2007, Fujifilm has released a Z series of cameras, including the FinePix Z5fd.

=== Discontinued models ===
- FinePix F10
- FinePix F11
- Finepix F30
- FinePix F50fd
- FinePix F60fd
- FinePix F70EXR/F75EXR
- FinePix F100fd
- FinePix F200EXR
- FinePix F480

== Comparison of Fujifilm FinePix F-series cameras ==
Model	Release date	Sensor res., size	Sensor type	Lens (35 mm equiv.) aperture	Optical zoom	Digital zoom	Shutter Speed seconds	Image processor	LCD screen size, pixels	Memory	Battery	Dimensions W×H×D (mm)	Weight (-batt.)	Photo	Notes
F10	February 2005	6.3 MP 2848×2136; 1/1.7"	Super CCD HR V	36–108 mm f/2.8–5.0	3×		3 to 1/2000; 15 to 3 night mode		2.5"; 115,000	xD-Picture Card	NP-120	92.0 × 58.0 × 27.0	200 g		
F11		6.3 MP 2848×2136; 1/1.7"	Super CCD HR V	36–108 mm f/2.8–5.0	3×	6.2×	3 to 1/2000; 15 to 3 night mode		2.5"; 153,000	xD-Picture Card	NP-120	92.0 × 58.0 × 27.0	155 g		
F30	May 2006	6.3 MP 2848×2136; 1/1.7"	Super CCD HR VI	36–108 mm f/2.8–5.0	3×	6.2×	3 to 1/2000; 15 to 3 night mode		2.5"; 230,000	xD-Picture Card	NP-95	92.7 × 56.7 × 27.8	155 g		
F20	July 2006	6.3 MP 2848×2136; 1/1.7"	Super CCD HR VI	36–108 mm f/2.8–5.0	3×	6.2×	4 to 1/2000	Real Photo Processor II	2.5"; 153,000	xD-Picture Card	NP-70	94 × 57 × 27	150 g		
F31fd	September 2006	6.3 MP 2848×2136; 1/1.7"	Super CCD HR VI	36–108 mm f/2.8–5.0	3×	6.2×	3 to 1/2000; 15 to 1 night mode	Real Photo Processor II	2.5"; 230,000	xD-Picture Card	NP-95	92.7 × 56.7 × 27.8	155 g		
F40fd	March 2007	8.3 MP 3296×2472; 1/1.6"	Super CCD HR VI	36–108 mm f/2.8–5.1	3×	6.9×	3 to 1/2000	Real Photo Processor II	2.5"; 230,000	SD, xD-Picture Card	NP-70	95.7 × 59 × 23.3	155 g		
F47fd	June 2007	9.03 MP 3488×2616; 1/1.6"	Super CCD HR VI	36–108 mm f/2.8–5.1	3×	7.6×	3 to 1/2000	Real Photo Processor II	2.5"; 230,000	SD, SDHC, xD-Picture Card	NP-70	95.7 × 59 × 23.3	155 g		
F480	July 2007	8.2 MP 3264×2448; 1/2.5"		28–112 mm f/2.8–5.6	4×	5.1×	4 to 1/1500		2.7"; 230,000	SD, SDHC, xD-Picture Card	NP-40N	95.6 × 55.4 × 23.0	140 g		
F50fd	July 2007	12 MP 4000×3000; 4224×2816; 1/1.6"	Super CCD HR VII	35–105 mm f/2.8–5.1	3×	8.2×	8 to 1/2000	Real Photo Processor II	2.7"; 230,000	SD, SDHC, xD-Picture Card	NP-50	92.5 × 59.2 × 22.9	155 g		
F100fd	January 2008	12 MP 4000×3000; 4224×2816; 1/1.6"	Super CCD HR VIII	28–140 mm f/3.3-5.1	5×	8.2×	4 to 1/1500	Real Photo Processor III	2.7"; 230,000	SD, SDHC, xD-Picture Card	NP-50	97.7 × 58.9 × 23.4	153 g		
F60fd	August 2008	12 MP 4000×3000; 4224×2816; 1/1.6"	Super CCD HR VII	35–105 mm f/2.8–5.1	3×	8.2×	8 to 1/2000	Real Photo Processor II	3.0"; 230,000	SD, xD-Picture Card	NP-50	92.5 × 59.2 × 22.9	155 g		
F200EXR	February 2009	12 MP 4000×3000; 1/1.6"	Super CCD EXR	28–140 mm f/3.3-5.1	5×	4.4×	8 to 1/1500		3.0"; 230,000	SD, SDHC, xD-Picture Card	NP-50	97.7 × 58.9 × 23.4	175 g		
F70EXR; F72EXR; F75EXR	July 2009	10 MP 3616×2712; 1/2"		27–270 mm f/3.3-5.6	10×	4×			2.7"; 230,000	SD, SDHC	NP-50	99.3 × 58.9 × 22.7	180 g		
F80EXR; F85EXR	February 2010	12 MP 4000×3000; 1/2"	Super CCD EXR	27–270 mm f/3.3-5.6	10×	4×	8 to 1/2000		3.0"; 230,000	SD, SDHC	NP-50	99.3 × 58.9 × 28.4	183 g		
F300EXR; F305EXR		12 MP 4000×3000; 1/2"	Super CCD EXR	24–360 mm f/3.5-5.3	15×	4×	8 to 1/2000		3.0"; 460,000	SD, SDHC	NP-50	103.5 × 59.2 × 32.6	195 g		
F500EXR	August 2011	16 MP 4608×3456; 1/2"	EXR CMOS	24–360 mm f/3.5-5.3	15×	5×	8 to 1/2000		3.0"; 460,000	SD, SDHC	NP-50	103.5 × 59.2 × 32.6	195 g		
F550EXR; F505EXR	August 2011	16 MP 4608×3456; 1/2"	EXR CMOS	24–360 mm f/3.5-5.3	15×	5×	8 to 1/2000		3.0"; 460,000	SD, SDHC	NP-50	103.5 × 59.2 × 32.6	195 g		
F600EXR	August 2011	16 MP 4608×3456; 1/2"	EXR CMOS	24–360 mm f/3.5-5.3	15×	2×	8 to 1/2000		3.0"; 460,000	SD, SDHC	NP-50	103.5 × 62.5 × 32.6	201 g		
F660EXR; F665EXR		16 MP 4608×3456; 1/2"	EXR CMOS	24–360 mm f/3.5-5.3	15×	2×	8 to 1/2000		3.0"; 460,000	SD, SDHC, SDXC (UHS-I)	NP-50A	103.5 × 59.2 × 32.6	196 g		
F770EXR	March 2012	16 MP 4608×3456; 1/2"	EXR CMOS		20×										
F800EXR		16 MP 4608×3456; 1/2"	EXR CMOS		20×					SD, SDHC					
F850EXR		16 MP 4608×3456; 1/2"	EXR CMOS		20×					SD, SDHC					
F900EXR		16 MP 4608×3456; 1/2"	EXR CMOS II							SD, SDHC					

== See also ==
- Fujifilm FinePix
- Fujifilm
