= Nikon D5000 =

2009 APS-C digital single-lens reflex camera

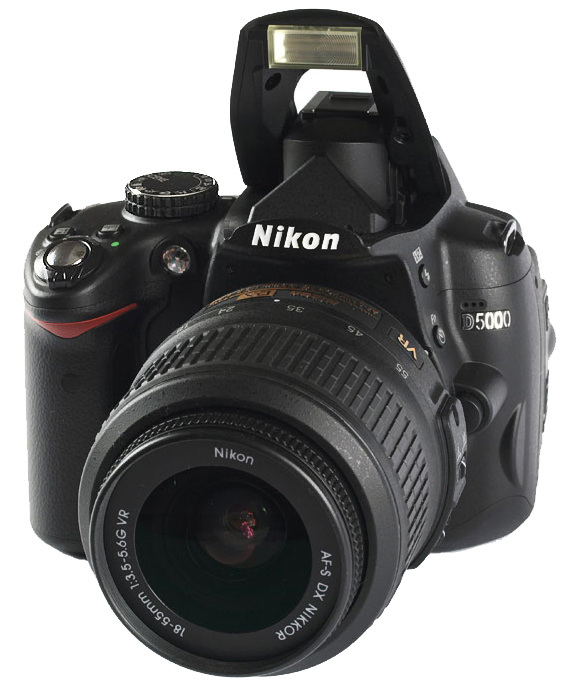
- Nikon D5000 with 18-55 VR kit lens

Overview
- Maker: Nikon
- Type: Digital single-lens reflex
- Intro price: $729.95

Lens
- Lens: Interchangeable, Nikon F-mount

Sensor/medium
- Sensor: 23.6 × 15.8 mm Nikon DX format RGB CMOS sensor, 1.5 × FOV crop
- Maximum resolution: 4,288 × 2,848 (12.3 effective megapixels)
- Film speed: 200–3200 in 1/3 EV steps, up to 6400 as high-boost, as low as 100 low-boost
- Recording medium: Secure Digital, SDHC compatible (up to a maximum of 32 GB officially supported, dependent on card manufacturer)

Focusing
- Focus modes: Instant single-servo (AF-S); continuous-servo (AF-C); auto AF-S/AF-C selection (AF-A); manual (M)
- Focus areas: 11-area AF system, Multi-CAM 1000 AF Sensor Module

Exposure/metering
- Exposure modes: Auto modes (auto, auto [flash off]), Advanced Scene Modes (Portrait, Landscape, Sports, Close-up, Night Portrait), programmed auto with flexible program (P), shutter-priority auto (S), aperture-priority auto (A), manual (M), (Q) quiet mode.
- Exposure metering: TTL 3D Color Matrix Metering II metering with a 420-pixel RGB sensor
- Metering modes: 3D Color Matrix Metering II, Center-weighted and Spot

Flash
- Flash: Built in Pop-up, Guide number 13m at ISO 100, Standard ISO hotshoe, Compatible with the Nikon Creative Lighting System
- Flash bracketing: 2 or 3 frames in steps of 1/3, 1/2, 2/3, 1 or 2 EV

Shutter
- Shutter: Electronically controlled vertical-travel focal-plane shutter
- Shutter speed range: 30 s to 1/4000 s in 1/2 or 1/3 stops and Bulb, 1/200 s X-sync
- Continuous shooting: 4 frame/s for 67 Large Fine JPEG or 11 RAW frames

Viewfinder
- Viewfinder: Optical 0.78x, 95% Pentamirror

Image processing
- White balance: Auto, Incandescent, Fluorescent, Sunlight, Flash, Cloudy, Shade, Preset

General
- Video recording: 720p @ 24 frames/sec (full 24p film mode)
- LCD screen: 2.7-inch tilt and swivel 320x240 pixel (QVGA) TFT-LCD
- Battery: Nikon EN-EL9a Lithium-Ion battery
- Weight: Approx. 560 g (1 lb 4 oz) without battery, memory card or body cap
- Made in: Thailand

Chronology
- Successor: Nikon D5100

The D5000 is a 12.3-megapixel DX-format DSLR Nikon F-mount camera, announced by Nikon on 14 April 2009. The D5000 has many features in common with the D90. It features a 2.7-inch 230,000-dot resolution tilt-and-swivel LCD monitor (D90 is 3.0-inch (76 mm), 920,000 pixel, without swivel or tilt), live view, ISO 200–3200 (100–6400 with Boost), 3D tracking Multi-CAM1000 11-point AF system, active D-Lighting system and automatic correction of lateral chromatic aberration. The D5000 seems to have been discontinued in November 2010.

It was the second Nikon DSLR camera to feature movie mode after the feature was introduced by the D90, though this capability has now been extended to other models as well, such as the D300S and the D3S. Some newer models are even capable of 1080p 24 frame/s video, such as the Nikon D3100, Nikon D5100 and the Nikon D7000. As with the D90, each uninterrupted movie shot at 720p is limited to 5 minutes duration and 20 minutes for all other resolutions (the D7000 can do 20 min movies). One-button Live View mode features subject tracking and face detection auto-focus modes.

== Features ==
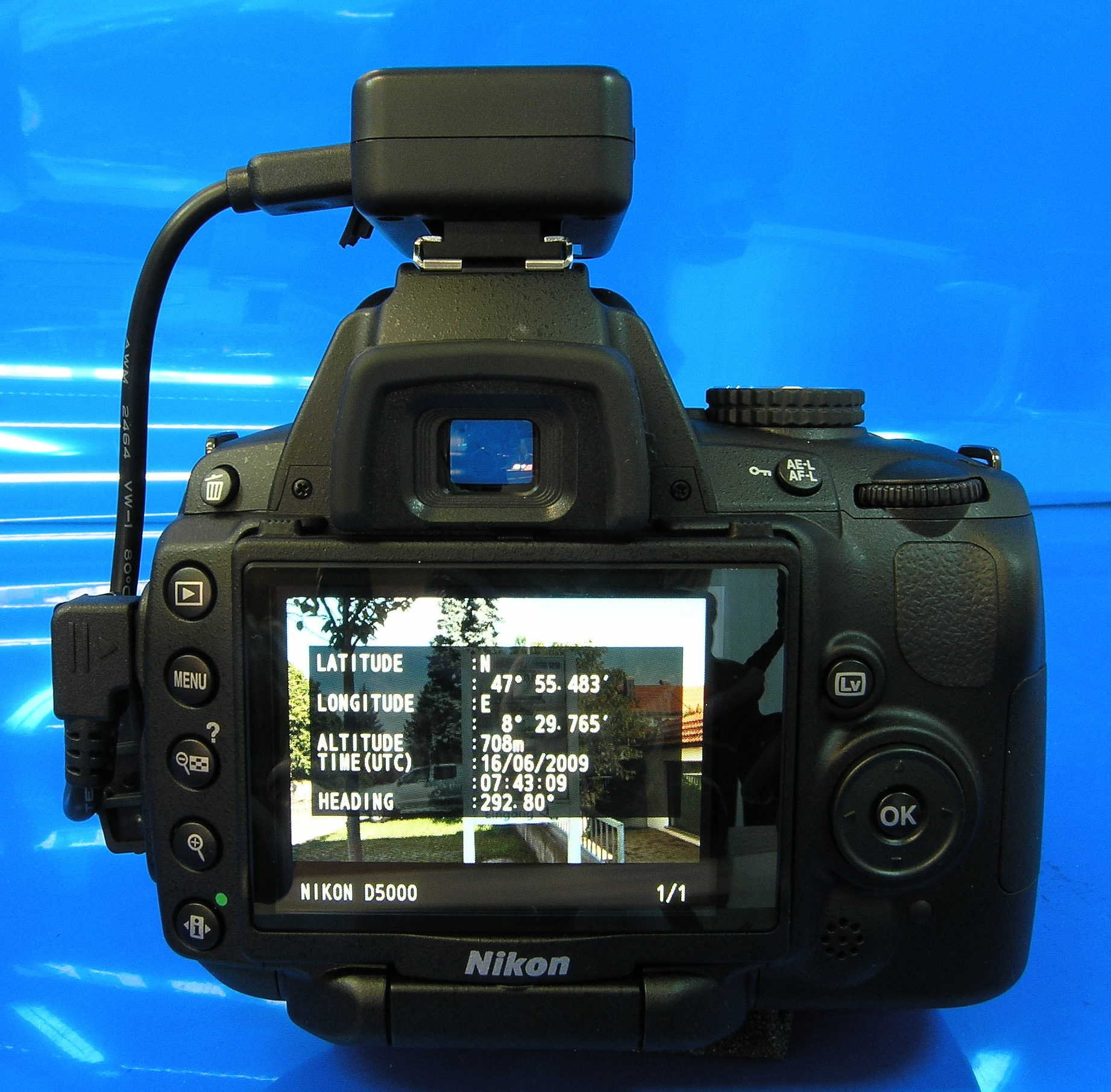
Nikon D5000 with GPS Solmeta N2.

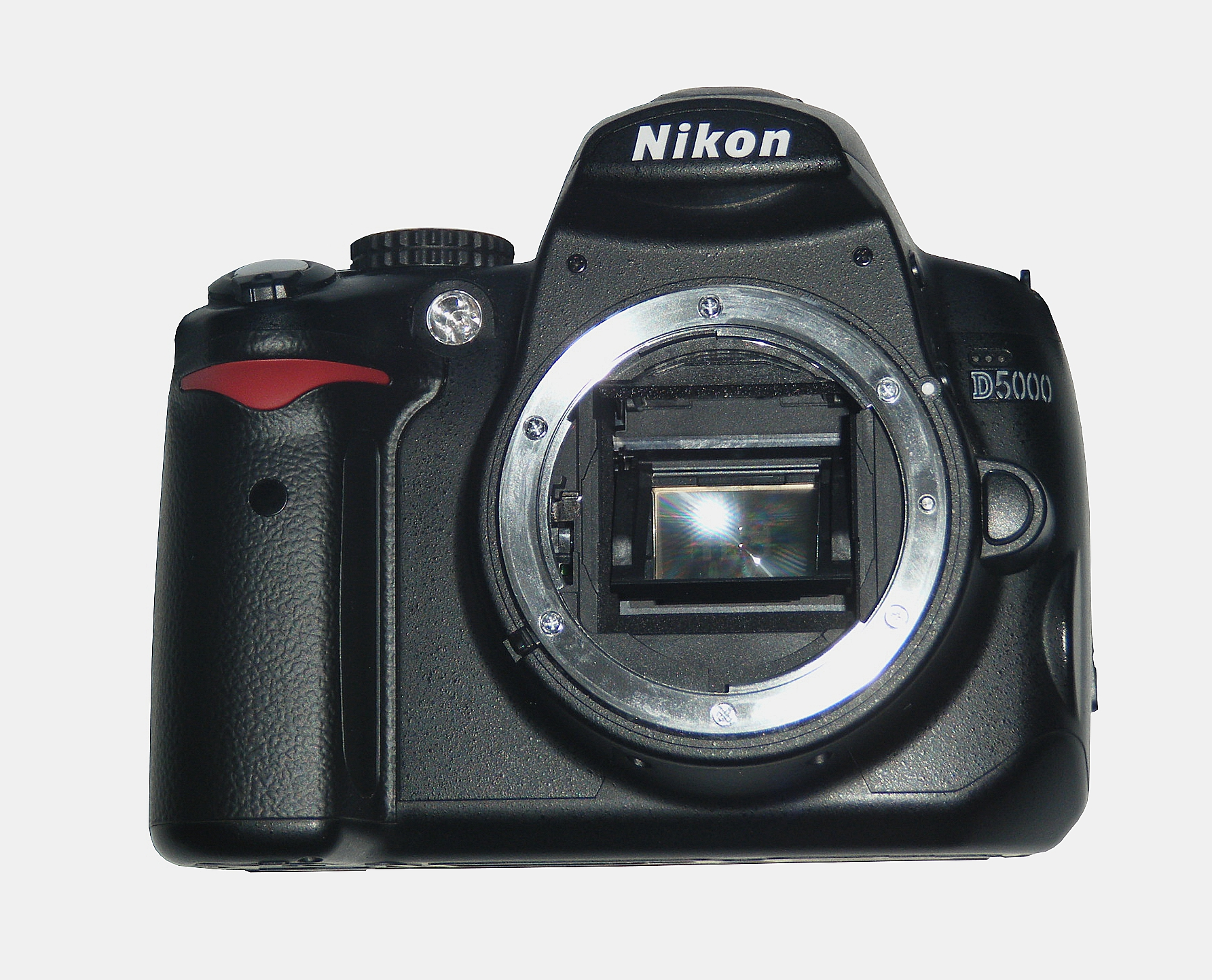
Nikon D5000 body

HD video shot with D5000

- Nikon's 12.3-megapixel Nikon DX format CMOS sensor.
- Nikon EXPEED image/video processor.
- D-Movie mode (24 frame/s with mono 22 kHz sound). Selectable from 320 × 192 pixels, 640 × 368 pixels or 1,280 × 720 pixels (720p).
- Active D-Lighting (4 levels and Auto).
- Automatic correction of lateral chromatic aberration for JPEGs. Correction-data is additionally stored in RAW-files and used by Nikon Capture NX, View NX and some other RAW tools.
- Auto lens distortion ("Distortion") correction and Perspective Control as well as image rotation ("Straighten") via playback ("Retouch") menu
- 2.7-inch articulated 230,000-dot resolution TFT LCD with +180/-90 degree tilt and 180 degree rotation.
- Live View shooting mode with Contrast Detect and subject tracking auto focus (activated with a dedicated button).
- Continuous Drive up to 4 frames per second.
- 3D Color Matrix Metering II with Scene Recognition System.
- 3D Tracking Multi-CAM 1000 autofocus sensor module with 11 AF points.
- ISO sensitivity 200 to 3200 (100–6400 with boost, respectively called LO-1 and HI-1).
- Nikon F-mount lenses.
- i-TTL flash exposure system without built-in wireless control (no Commander-mode, but support for SU-800 wireless speedlight commander). Compatibility: SB-400, SB-600, SB-700, SB-800, SB-900, SB-910, R1C1 and third-party manufacturers
- Auto scene recognition mode with 19 pre-programmed scenes.
- Inbuilt time-lapse photography intervalometer
- Quiet shooting mode.
- Shutter rated to 100,000 cycles.
- Built-in sensor cleaning system (vibrating low-pass filter) and airflow control system.
- HDMI HD video output.
- Support for GP-1 GPS geotagging unit.
- File formats: JPEG, NEF (Nikon's RAW, 12-bit compressed), AVI (Motion JPEG).
- EN-EL9a lithium-ion battery, battery life (shots per charge) approx.: 510 shots (CIPA).

Like the Nikon D40, Nikon D40X, Nikon D60, Nikon D3000, Nikon D3100 and Nikon D5100, the D5000 has no in-body autofocus motor, and fully automatic autofocus requires a lens with an integrated autofocus-motor. With any other lenses the camera's electronic rangefinder can be used to manually adjust focus.

Can mount unmodified A-lenses (also called Non-AI, Pre-AI or F-type) with support of the electronic rangefinder and without metering.

== Reception ==
Dxomark published a detailed analysis where they rated the sensor of the D5000 in terms of image noise, dynamic range and color depth about 2/3 stops better than the Canon 500D / T1i, which was visible in real-life comparisons made by Camera Labs. DxOmark's camera sensor ranking places the D5000 above its competitors and even higher priced cameras like the Canon EOS-1D Mark III and Canon EOS 5D, partly due to a high dynamic range.

The Nikon D5000 has been tested by many independent reviewers.

== Recall ==
In late July 2009, there was a recall due to a problem that was discovered with the camera's power systems. The flaw would cause the system to cease powering on, both when running on battery or wall outlet power. For affected serial numbers, see Nikon advisory.

The service includes fast shipping both ways to the repair shop with most people receiving their fixed camera within 2 weeks. On August 12, 2009, Nikon notified that some registered users of the Nikon D5000 who sent their camera in for repairs would need to send it in for additional repairs.

== See also ==
- List of Nikon F-mount lenses with integrated autofocus motors

Sensor	Class	1999	2000	2001	2002	2003	2004	2005	2006	2007	2008	2009	2010	2011	2012	2013	2014	2015	2016	2017	2018	2019	2020	2021	2022	2023	2024	2025	2026
FX (Full-frame)	Flagship											D3X ^{−P}																	
FX (Full-frame)	Flagship										D3 ^{−P}		D3S ^{−P}		D4		D4S		D5^{T}					D6^{T}					
FX (Full-frame)	Professional											D700 ^{−P}			D800/D800E			D810/D810A			D850 ^{AT}								
FX (Full-frame)	Enthusiast																Df												
FX (Full-frame)	Enthusiast																	D750 ^{A}					D780 ^{AT}						
FX (Full-frame)	Enthusiast															D600	D610												
DX (APS-C)	Flagship		D1^{−E}	D1X^{−E}				D2X^{−E}		D2Xs^{−E}																			
DX (APS-C)	Flagship		D1^{−E}	D1H ^{−E}			D2H^{−E}	D2Hs^{−E}																					
DX (APS-C)	Professional				D100^{−E}				D200^{−E}		D300^{−P}		D300S^{−P}						D500 ^{AT}										
DX (APS-C)	Enthusiast						D70^{−E}		D70s^{−E}	D80^{−E}		D90^{−E}		D7000 ^{−P}			D7100	D7200			D7500 ^{AT}								
DX (APS-C)	Upper-entry								D50^{−E}	D40X^{−E*}	D60^{−E*}		D5000^{A−P*}		D5100^{A−P*}	D5200^{A−P*}	D5300^{A*}	D5500^{AT*}		D5600 ^{AT*}									
DX (APS-C)	Entry-level									D40^{−E*}			D3000^{−E*}	D3100^{−P*}		D3200^{−P*}	D3300^{*}			D3400^{*}		D3500^{*}							
Early models		SVC (prototype; 1986); QV-1000C (1988); NASA F4 (1991); E2/E2S (1995); E2N/E2NS (1996); E3/E3S (1998)																											
Sensor	Class																												
Sensor	Class	1999	2000	2001	2002	2003	2004	2005	2006	2007	2008	2009	2010	2011	2012	2013	2014	2015	2016	2017	2018	2019	2020	2021	2022	2023	2024	2025	2026
