= Nikon D5300 =

2013 digital single-lens reflex camera

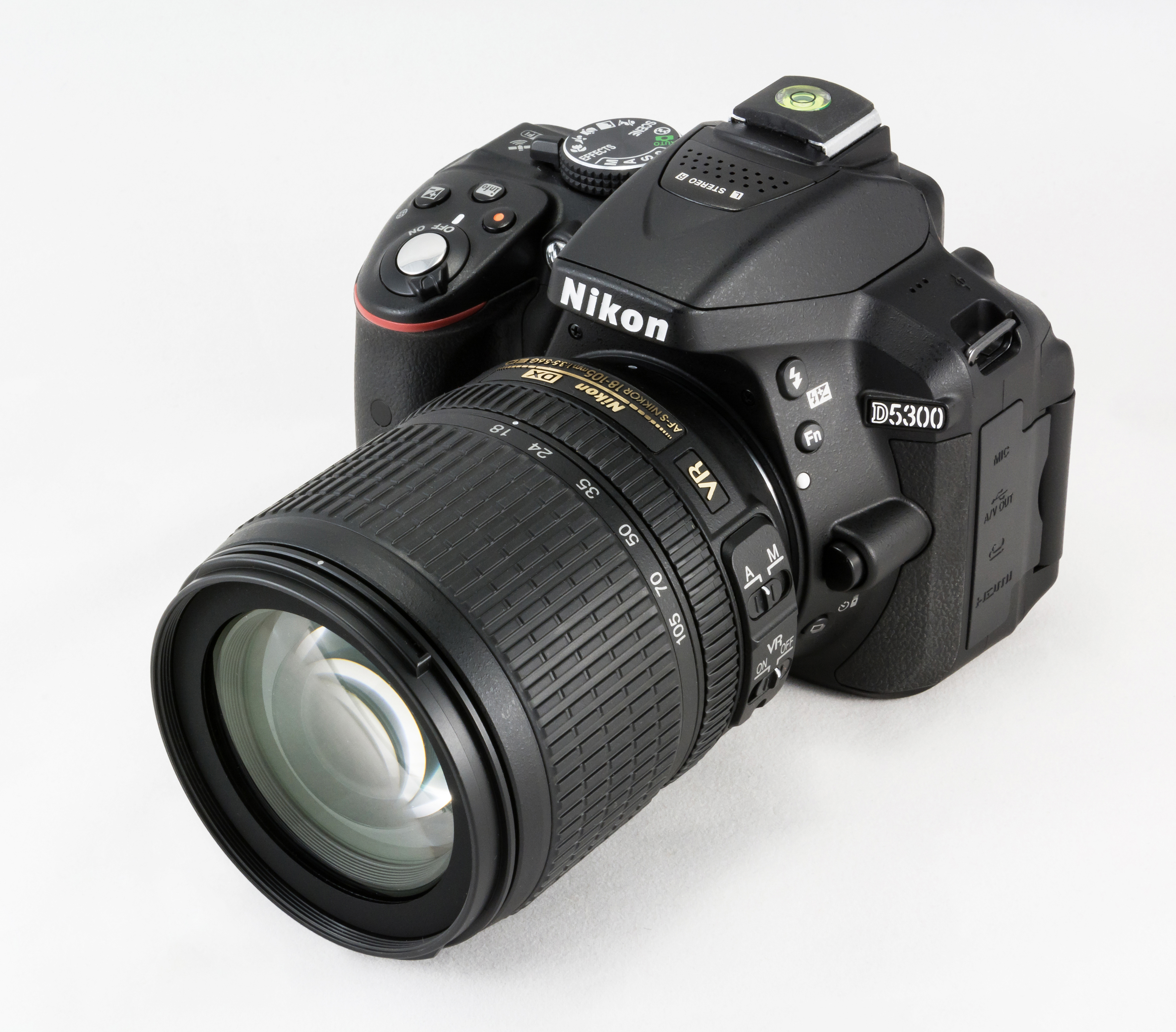

Overview
- Maker: Nikon
- Type: Digital single-lens reflex

Lens
- Lens: Interchangeable, Nikon F-mount (with AF contacts)

Sensor/medium
- Sensor: 23.5 mm × 15.6 mm Nikon DX format RGB CMOS sensor, 1.5 × FOV crop
- Maximum resolution: 6000 × 4000 pixels (24.2 megapixels)
- Storage media: Secure Digital, SDSC, SDHC, SDXC, supports UHS-I bus.

Focusing
- Focus modes: Instant single-servo (AF-S); continuous-servo (AF-C); auto AF-S/AF-C selection (AF-A); manual (MF)
- Focus areas: 39-area AF system, Nikon Multi-CAM 4800DX sensor module

Exposure/metering
- Exposure modes: Auto modes (auto, auto [flash off]), Advanced Scene Modes (Portrait, Landscape, Child, Sports, Close-up, Night Portrait, Night Landscape, Party/Indoor, Beach/Snow, Sunset, Dusk/Dawn, Pet Portrait, Candlelight, Blossom, Autumn Colours, Food), programmed auto with flexible program (P), shutter-priority auto (S), aperture-priority auto (A), manual (M), Special Effects Modes (Night Vision, Colour Sketch, Miniature Effect, Selective Colour, Silhouette, High Key, Low Key).
- Exposure metering: TTL 3D colour Matrix Metering II metering with a 2016-pixel RGB sensor
- Metering modes: 3D colour Matrix Metering II, Centre-weighted, and Spot

Flash
- Flash: Built in Pop-up, Guide number 13m at ISO 100, Standard ISO hotshoe, Compatible with the Nikon Creative Lighting System

Shutter
- Shutter: Electronically controlled vertical-travel focal-plane shutter
- Shutter speed range: 30 s to 1/4000 s in 1/2 or 1/3 stops and Bulb, 1/200 s X-sync
- Continuous shooting: Up to 5 frames per second (JPEG and 12-bit RAW) or 4 frames per second (14-bit RAW)

Viewfinder
- Viewfinder: Optical 0.82x, 95% Pentamirror

Image processing
- White balance: Auto, Incandescent, Fluorescent (7 types), Direct Sunlight, Flash, Cloudy, Shade, Preset manual
- WB bracketing: 3 shots in steps of 1

General
- Video recording: 1920 x 1080 60/50/30/25/24P (progressive scan), 1280 x 720 60p/50p, 640 x 368 30p/25p All available as High or Normal bitrate modes (60p actual framerate 59.94 fps, 30p actual frame rate 29.97 fps)
- LCD screen: 3.2-inch (81 mm) articulated 1073k-dot 720 × 480 vari-angle TFT LCD
- Battery: Nikon EN-EL14 or EN-EL14A Lithium-Ion battery
- AV port(s): Type C Mini-HDMI for video, 3.5mm stereo jack for microphone
- Data port(s): USB, 802.11b/g Wi-Fi, GPS
- Dimensions: Approx. 125 mm × 98 mm × 76 mm (4.9 in × 3.9 in × 3.0 in)
- Weight: 480 g (16.9 oz) body only
- Latest firmware: 1.03 / 7 June 2018; 8 years ago
- Made in: Thailand

Chronology
- Predecessor: Nikon D5200
- Successor: Nikon D5500

References
- Product page Reference Manual, section Specifications

The Nikon D5300 is an F-mount DSLR with a carbon-fiber-reinforced polymer body and other new technologies, announced by Nikon on October 17, 2013. It is a mid-range camera with a crop sensor and requires a minimum camera 8.3 raw plugin for Photoshop to process its .NEF files.

It features the Expeed 4 processor and is the company's first DSLR with built-in Wi-Fi and GPS. It shares the same 24-megapixel image sensor as its D5200 predecessor, but without an anti-aliasing (AA) filter, equal to the Nikon D7100. MSRP for the body is $800, and $1,400 with an 18–140mm f/3.5-5.6 kit lens. The camera replaces the D5200 and is replaced by the Nikon D5500.

This model of camera was involved in the RAF Voyager, ZZ333 incident on 9 February 2014.

== Features ==
- Expeed 4 with lower power consumption; extended battery life to 600 shots
- Full HD video 1080p with auto focus also in uncompressed video (clean HDMI at 60p,30p,24p only) format. Nikon's first DSLR with 60p/50p framerate at full HD resolution (several previous Nikon bodies supported 60p/50p, but only at 720p)
- Assisted GPS built-in ("A-GPS" Almanac files downloadable from Nikon)
- WLAN (Wi-Fi) built-in
- Automatic correction of lateral chromatic aberration for JPEGs. Correction-data is additionally stored in raw files and used by Nikon Capture NX, View NX and some other raw tools.
- No Anti-aliasing (AA) filter
- New pentamirror with 0.82x magnification and 95% frame coverage
- Nine special effects
- Active D-Lighting (four-level and auto).
- Bracketing (exposure, Active D-Lighting and white-balance)
- In-camera HDR mode.
- Inbuilt time-lapse photography intervalometer
- Quiet shooting mode.
- Built-in sensor cleaning system (achieved by vibrating sensor) and airflow control system.
- HDMI HD video output.
- Enhanced built-in raw processing with extended Retouch menu for image processing without using a computer: D-Lighting, Red-eye correction, Trimming, Monochrome & filter effects, Color balance, Image overlay, NEF (RAW) processing, Resize, Quick retouch, Straighten, Distortion control, Fisheye, Color outline, Color sketch, Perspective control, Miniature effect, Selective color, Edit movie, Side-by-side comparison.
- Stereo microphone input (has stereo built-in mic)
- 3.2-inch (81 mm) articulated 1073k-dot 720 × 480 vari-angle TFT LCD.
- EN-EL14 or EN-EL14a Lithium-ion Battery.
- Slightly smaller and lighter body (480 g) than its predecessor

Like Nikon's other consumer level DSLRs, the D5300 has no in-body auto focus motor, and fully automatic auto focus requires one of the currently 362 lenses with an integrated auto focus motor. With any other lenses the camera's electronic rangefinder (which indicates if the subject inside the selected focus point is in focus or not) can be used to manually adjust focus.

The D5300 can mount unmodified A-lenses (also called Non-AI, Pre-AI or F-type) with support of the electronic rangefinder and without metering.

== See also ==
- Nikon D5500
- List of Nikon F-mount lenses with integrated autofocus motor

Sensor	Class	'99	'00	'01	'02	'03	'04	'05	'06	'07	'08	'09	'10	'11	'12	'13	'14	'15	'16	'17	'18	'19	'20	'21	'22	'23	'24	'25	'26
FX (Full-frame)	Flagship											D3X ^{−P}																	
FX (Full-frame)	Flagship										D3 ^{−P}		D3S ^{−P}		D4		D4S		D5^{T}					D6^{T}					
FX (Full-frame)	Professional											D700 ^{−P}			D800/D800E			D810/D810A			D850 ^{AT}								
FX (Full-frame)	Enthusiast																Df												
FX (Full-frame)	Enthusiast																	D750 ^{A}					D780 ^{AT}						
FX (Full-frame)	Enthusiast															D600	D610												
DX (APS-C)	Flagship		D1^{−E}	D1X^{−E}				D2X^{−E}		D2Xs^{−E}																			
DX (APS-C)	Flagship		D1^{−E}	D1H ^{−E}			D2H^{−E}	D2Hs^{−E}																					
DX (APS-C)	Professional				D100^{−E}				D200^{−E}		D300^{−P}		D300S^{−P}						D500 ^{AT}										
DX (APS-C)	Enthusiast						D70^{−E}		D70s^{−E}	D80^{−E}		D90^{−E}		D7000 ^{−P}			D7100	D7200			D7500 ^{AT}								
DX (APS-C)	Upper-entry								D50^{−E}	D40X^{−E*}	D60^{−E*}		D5000^{A−P*}		D5100^{A−P*}	D5200^{A−P*}	D5300^{A*}	D5500^{AT*}		D5600 ^{AT*}									
DX (APS-C)	Entry-level									D40^{−E*}			D3000^{−E*}	D3100^{−P*}		D3200^{−P*}	D3300^{*}			D3400^{*}		D3500^{*}							
Early models		SVC (prototype; 1986); QV-1000C (1988); NASA F4 (1991); E2/E2S (1995); E2N/E2NS (1996); E3/E3S (1998)																											
Sensor	Class																												
Sensor	Class	'99	'00	'01	'02	'03	'04	'05	'06	'07	'08	'09	'10	'11	'12	'13	'14	'15	'16	'17	'18	'19	'20	'21	'22	'23	'24	'25	'26
