= Nikon D5600 =

Digital camera model

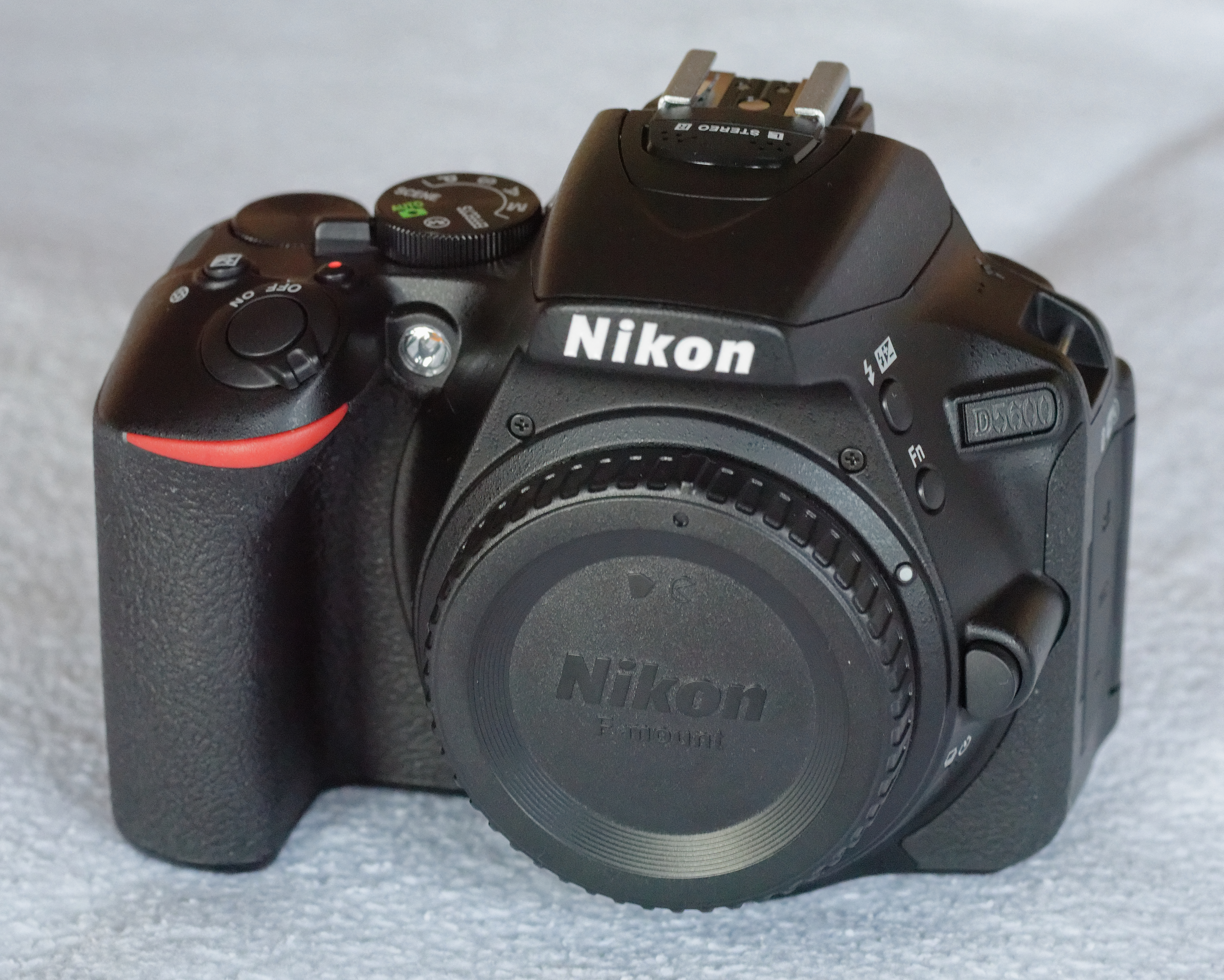

Overview
- Maker: Nikon
- Type: Digital single-lens reflex

Lens
- Lens: Interchangeable, Nikon F-mount

Sensor/medium
- Sensor: 23.5 mm × 15.6 mm Nikon DX format RGB CMOS sensor, 1.5 × FOV crop
- Maximum resolution: 6000 × 4000 pixels (24.2 megapixels)
- Film speed: ISO 100-25600
- Recording medium: Secure Digital, SDSC, SDHC, SDXC, supports UHS-I bus.

Exposure/metering
- Exposure metering: Multi-CAM 4800DX

Shutter
- Shutter speed range: 1/4000 to 30 s
- Continuous shooting: 5 fps

Viewfinder
- Viewfinder: 95% coverage, 0.82x magnification

General
- Battery: Nikon EN-EL14A Lithium-Ion
- Weight: 465 g (16 oz) (1.025 lb)
- Latest firmware: 1.20 / 17 December 2024; 15 months ago
- Made in: Thailand

Chronology
- Predecessor: Nikon D5500

The Nikon D5600 is a 24.2 megapixel upper-entry level, APS-C sensor DSLR announced by Nikon on November 10, 2016, as the successor of the D5500. The camera has an F-mount.

D5600 offers only small changes over the predecessor, among them is Bluetooth connection. With SnapBridge application on smart device, the camera can be remote controlled. SnapBridge also allows automated updating of camera's clock and GPS.

In January 2021, Nikon announced that the D5600 and D3500 would no longer be sold in Japan, but that sales elsewhere would continue "for the time being". In June 2022, it was confirmed that production of both models had ceased. Nikon did not release a direct successor to the D5600.

== Features ==
- 24MP CMOS sensor with no optical low-pass filter (OLPF), Nikon DX format; focal length equivalent to approx. 1.5x that of lenses with FX-format angle of view.
- Nikon EXPEED 4 image/video processor.
- 3.2″ Fully Articulated touchscreen LCD with 1.04M dots
- Full HD 1080p / 60fps movie mode with auto-focus while filming, mono sound, and stereo external mic support.
- ISO sensitivity 100 - 25600
- Active D-Lighting (four levels)
- Eye-level pentamirror single-lens reflex viewfinder
- 5.0 fps continuous shooting
- SD (Secure Digital) and UHS-I compliant SDHC and SDXC memory cards
- Autofocus is available with AF-S, AF-P and AF-I lenses
- Inbuilt time-lapse movie feature
- 39 point AF sensor with 9 central cross-type points
- 2,016-pixel RGB sensor assists AF tracking and metering
- 'SnapBridge' Bluetooth/Wi-Fi communication
- Exposure compensation can be adjusted by -5 to +5 EV in increments of 1/3 or 1/2 EV in P, S, A, M, SCENE and night vision modes
- Luminosity locked at detected value with AE-L/AF-L button
- Focus can be locked by pressing shutter-release button halfway (single-servo AF) or by pressing AE-L/AF-L button
- Built-in or external stereo microphone; sensitivity adjustable
- Weight 415 g (Body Only)

With the camera's initial firmware version Wi-Fi only works with Nikon's proprietary "SnapBridge" app, this also applies to other Nikon models. Since a firmware updated in May 2019 Wi-Fi was opened to third-party applications.

== Predecessor comparison ==
The Nikon D5600 is the successor to the Nikon D5500 (announced in January 2015). The cameras are very similar except for the following differences

- The Nikon D5600 has more connectivity options (NFC and Bluetooth), while the D5500 features only Wi-Fi.
- The Nikon D5600 has more battery life (970 shots vs 820 shots).

== Reception ==
Since its release, the D5600 has received positive reviews. It received the Best DSLR Entry Level award at the TIPA Awards 2017, sponsored by the Technical Image Press Association.

== See also ==
- List of Nikon F-mount lenses with integrated autofocus motor

Sensor	Class	'99	'00	'01	'02	'03	'04	'05	'06	'07	'08	'09	'10	'11	'12	'13	'14	'15	'16	'17	'18	'19	'20	'21	'22	'23	'24	'25	'26
FX (Full-frame)	Flagship											D3X ^{−P}																	
FX (Full-frame)	Flagship										D3 ^{−P}		D3S ^{−P}		D4		D4S		D5^{T}					D6^{T}					
FX (Full-frame)	Professional											D700 ^{−P}			D800/D800E			D810/D810A			D850 ^{AT}								
FX (Full-frame)	Enthusiast																Df												
FX (Full-frame)	Enthusiast																	D750 ^{A}					D780 ^{AT}						
FX (Full-frame)	Enthusiast															D600	D610												
DX (APS-C)	Flagship		D1^{−E}	D1X^{−E}				D2X^{−E}		D2Xs^{−E}																			
DX (APS-C)	Flagship		D1^{−E}	D1H ^{−E}			D2H^{−E}	D2Hs^{−E}																					
DX (APS-C)	Professional				D100^{−E}				D200^{−E}		D300^{−P}		D300S^{−P}						D500 ^{AT}										
DX (APS-C)	Enthusiast						D70^{−E}		D70s^{−E}	D80^{−E}		D90^{−E}		D7000 ^{−P}			D7100	D7200			D7500 ^{AT}								
DX (APS-C)	Upper-entry								D50^{−E}	D40X^{−E*}	D60^{−E*}		D5000^{A−P*}		D5100^{A−P*}	D5200^{A−P*}	D5300^{A*}	D5500^{AT*}		D5600 ^{AT*}									
DX (APS-C)	Entry-level									D40^{−E*}			D3000^{−E*}	D3100^{−P*}		D3200^{−P*}	D3300^{*}			D3400^{*}		D3500^{*}							
Early models		SVC (prototype; 1986); QV-1000C (1988); NASA F4 (1991); E2/E2S (1995); E2N/E2NS (1996); E3/E3S (1998)																											
Sensor	Class																												
Sensor	Class	'99	'00	'01	'02	'03	'04	'05	'06	'07	'08	'09	'10	'11	'12	'13	'14	'15	'16	'17	'18	'19	'20	'21	'22	'23	'24	'25	'26
