= Nikon D5100 =

Digital single-lens reflex camera

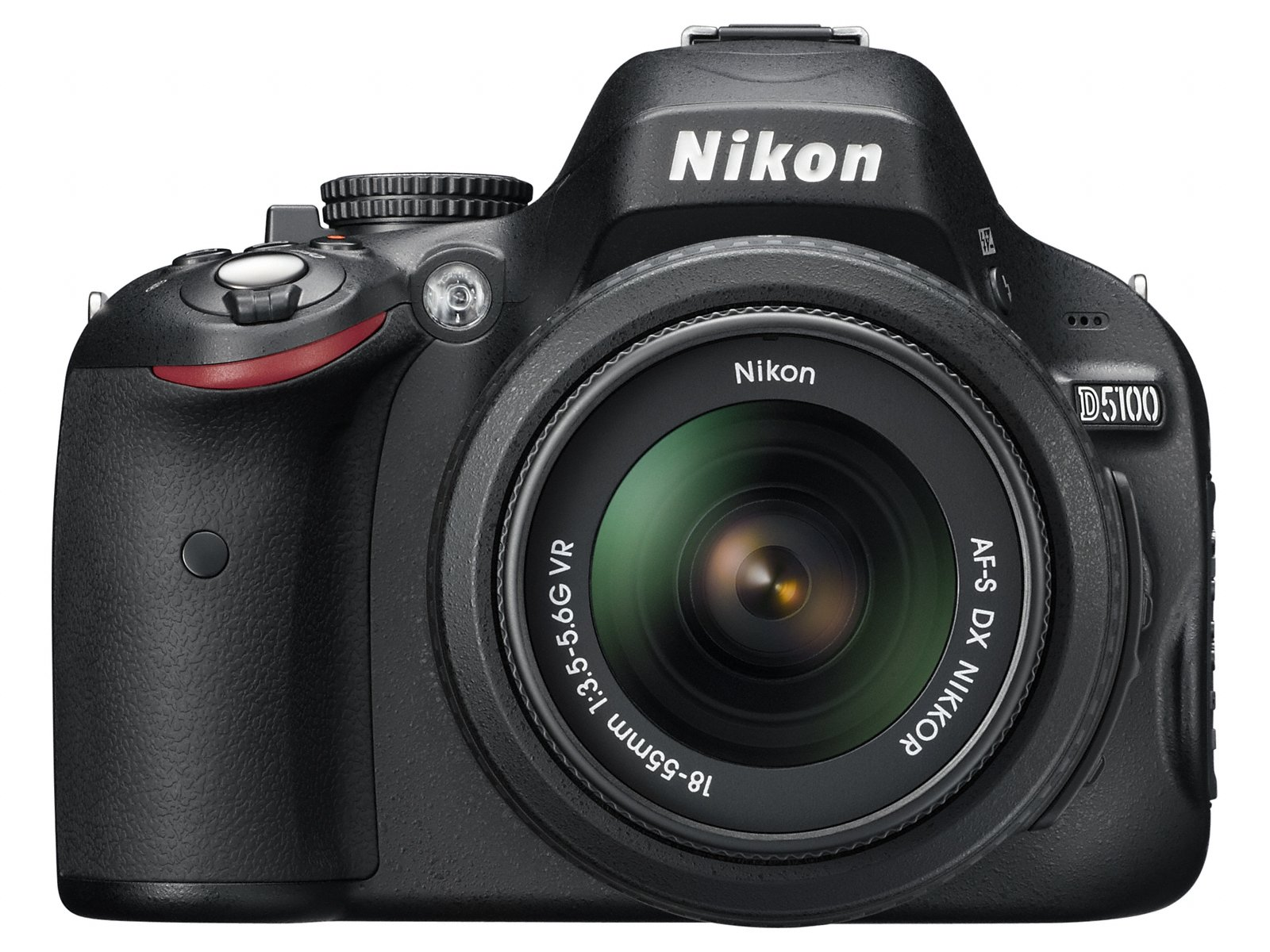
- Nikon D5100 with 18-55mm VR kit lens

Overview
- Maker: Nikon
- Type: DX-format Digital single-lens reflex
- Released: April 5, 2011

Lens
- Lens mount: Nikon F-mount

Sensor/medium
- Sensor: 23.6 mm × 15.6 mm Nikon DX format RGB CMOS sensor, 1.5 × FOV crop, 4.78 µm pixel size
- Sensor type: Active pixel sensor
- Sensor size: DX format (23.6 x 15.6 mm)
- Sensor maker: Sony
- Maximum resolution: 4,896 × 3,264 (16.2 effective megapixels)
- Film speed: 100–6400 in 1/3 EV steps, up to 25600 as high-boost. With Night-vision up to ISO 102400 equivalent.
- Storage media: Secure Digital, SDHC, SDXC compatible and with Eye-Fi WLAN support. Supports UHS-I cards.

Focusing
- Focus modes: Instant single-servo (AF-S); continuous-servo (AF-C); auto AF-S/AF-C selection (AF-A); manual (M)
- Focus areas: 11-area AF system, Multi-CAM 1000 AF Sensor Module

Exposure/metering
- Exposure modes: Auto modes (auto, auto [flash off]), Advanced Scene Modes (Portrait, Landscape, Sports, Close-up, Night Portrait), programmed auto with flexible program (P), shutter-priority auto (S), aperture-priority auto (A), manual (M), (Q) quiet mode.
- Exposure metering: TTL 3D Color Matrix Metering II metering with a 420-pixel RGB sensor
- Metering modes: 3D Color Matrix Metering II, Center-weighted and Spot

Flash
- Flash: Built in Pop-up, Guide number 13m at ISO 100, Standard ISO hotshoe, Compatible with the Nikon Creative Lighting System
- Flash bracketing: 2 or 3 frames in steps of 1/3, 1/2, 2/3, 1 or 2 EV

Shutter
- Shutter: Electronically controlled vertical-travel focal-plane shutter
- Shutter speed range: 30 s to 1/4000 s in 1/2 or 1/3 stops and Bulb, 1/200 s X-sync
- Continuous shooting: 4 frames per second

Viewfinder
- Viewfinder: Optical 0.78x, 95% Pentamirror

Image processing
- Image processor: EXPEED 2
- White balance: Auto, Incandescent, Fluorescent, Sunlight, Flash, Cloudy, Shade, Kelvin temperature, Preset

General
- Video recording: 1080p at up to 30fps
- LCD screen: 75-millimetre (3.0 in) tilt and swivel 921,000-dot LCD screen. 60x45 mm, 640x480 px, 271 ppi.
- Battery: Nikon EN-EL14 Lithium-Ion battery
- Dimensions: 128×97×79 mm (5.0×3.8×3.1 in)
- Weight: Approx. 510 g (1 lb. 2 oz) body only
- Made in: Thailand

Chronology
- Predecessor: Nikon D5000
- Successor: Nikon D5200

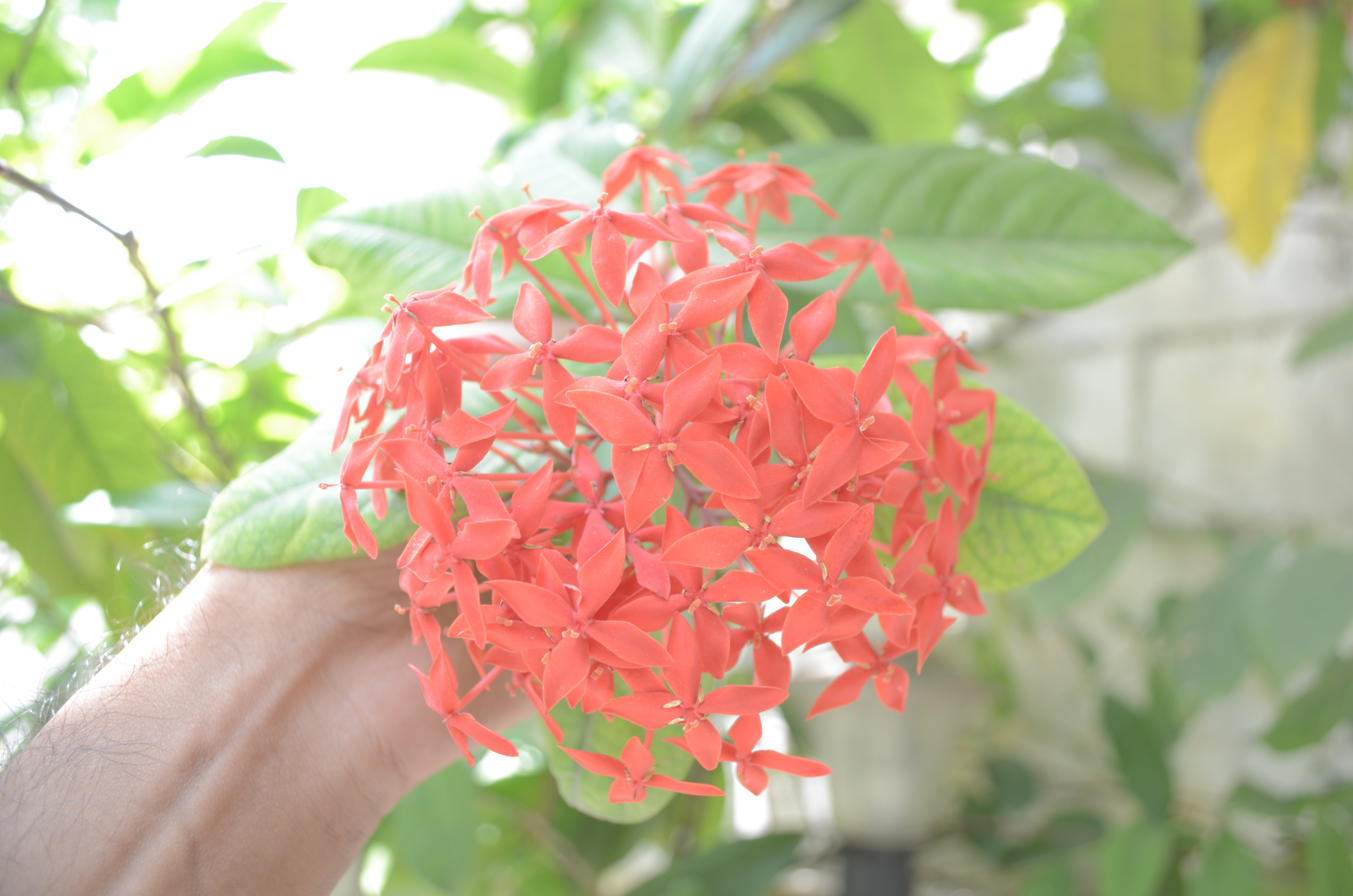
Uncropped or Unedited image from Nikon D5100 using an AF-S DX Nikkor 18-55mm f/3.5-5.6G VR lens for reference. Taken with maximum aperture at day time without flash. Details: F-stop: F/3.5 (Max aperture), Exposure time: 1/50 sec, ISO speed: 200, Focal Length: 18 mm, Flash fired: No, White Balance: Auto, Shot at day or night: Day time

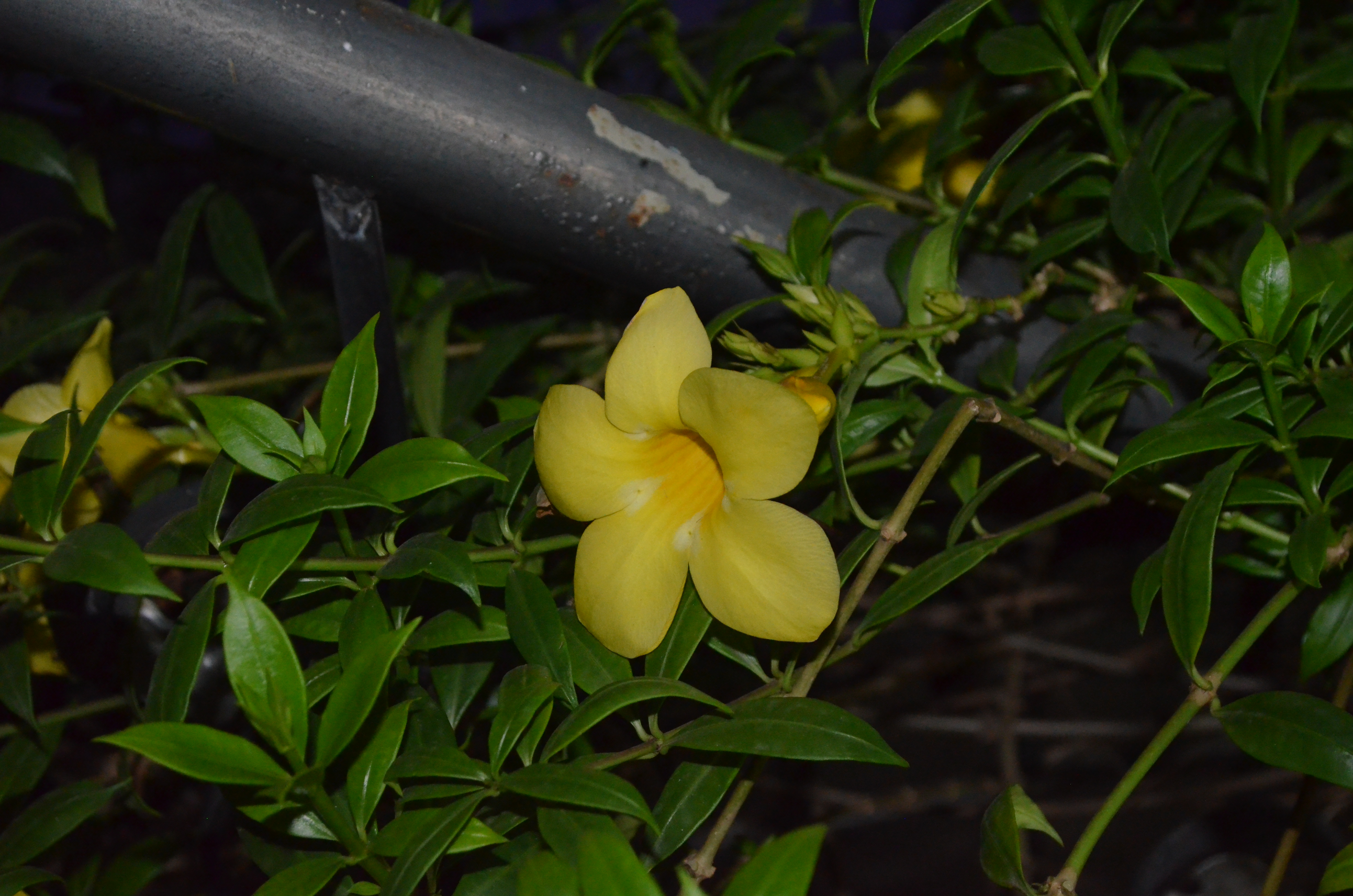
Uncropped or Unedited image from Nikon D5100 using an AF-S DX Nikkor 18-55mm f/3.5-5.6G VR lens for reference. Taken with minimum aperture at night time with flash. Details: F-stop: F/5.6 (Min aperture), Exposure time: 1/60 sec, ISO speed: 3200, Focal Length: 55 mm, Flash fired: Yes, White Balance: Auto, Shot at day or night: Night time

The Nikon D5100 is a 16.2-megapixel DX-format DSLR F-mount camera announced by Nikon on April 5, 2011. It features the same 16.2-megapixel CMOS sensor as the D7000 with 14-bit depth, while delivering Full HD 1080p video mode at either 24, 25 or 30 fps. The D5100 is the first Nikon DSLR to offer 1080p video at a choice of frame rates; previous Nikon DSLRs that recorded 1080p only did so at 24 fps. It replaced the D5000 and was replaced by the D5200.

== Feature list ==
- Sony IMX071 16.2-megapixel Nikon DX format CMOS sensor.
- Nikon EXPEED 2 image/video processor.
- Automatic correction of lateral chromatic aberration for JPEGs. Correction-data is additionally stored in RAW-files and used by Nikon Capture NX, View NX and some other RAW tools.
- D-Movie mode with autofocus. (Up to 1080p at 24, 25 or 30, 720p at 25 or 30 frames per second.)
- Inbuilt time-lapse photography intervalometer
- Active D-Lighting.
- First Nikon DSLR with in camera High Dynamic Range mode (Built-in Camera HDR).
- 3.0-inch (76 mm) articulated 921,000-dot LCD.
- Live View shooting mode with Contrast Detect and face priority auto focus (activated with a dedicated button).
- Continuous Drive up to 4 frames per second.
- 3D Color Matrix Metering II with Scene Recognition System.
- 3D Tracking Multi-CAM 1000 autofocus sensor module with 11 AF points (One cross-type sensor in centre of frame).
- ISO sensitivity 100 to 6400 and up to 25600 with boost. With monochrome Night-vision up to ISO 102400 equivalent.
- Bracketing (exposure, Active D-Lighting and white-balance).
- Auto scene recognition mode with 19 pre-programmed scenes.
- Quiet shooting mode.
- Built-in sensor cleaning system (vibrating low-pass filter) and airflow control system.
- HDMI HD video output.
- Stereo microphone input (mono using built-in mic)
- Enhanced built-in RAW processing with extended Retouch menu for image processing without using a computer: D-Lighting, Red-eye reduction, Trimming, Monochrome & filter effects, Color balance, Image overlay, NEF (RAW) processing, Quick retouch, Straighten, Distortion control, Fisheye, Color outline, Color sketch, Perspective control, Miniature effect, Selective Color, Edit movie, Side-by-side comparison.
- File formats: JPEG, NEF (Nikon's RAW, 14-bit), H.264 video codec.
- EN-EL14 Lithium-ion Battery with up to 660 shots per charge (CIPA).

The D5100 has no in-body autofocus motor, and fully automatic autofocus requires one of the currently 162 lenses with an integrated autofocus motor. With any other lenses the camera's electronic rangefinder (which indicates if the subject inside the selected focus point is in focus or not) can be used to manually adjust focus.

It can mount unmodified A-lenses (also called Non-AI, Pre-AI or F-type) with support of the electronic rangefinder and without metering.

=== Optional accessories ===
The Nikon D5100 has available accessories such as:

- Nikon Stereo Microphone ME-1
- Nikon ML-L3 Wireless (Infrared) and MC-DC2 wired remotes. Third party remotes are also available.
- Nikon GP-1 GPS Unit for direct GPS geotagging. Third party solutions partly with 3-axis compass, data-logger, bluetooth and support for indoor use are available from Solmeta, Dawn, Easytag, Foolography, Gisteq and Phottix. See comparisons/reviews.
- Battery grip third party solutions are available.
- Nikon CF-DC2 Soft Case.
- Third party solutions for WLAN transmitter are available.
- Various Nikon Speedlight or third party flash units including devices with Nikon Creative Lighting System wireless flash commander or support for SU-800 Wireless Speedlight Commander.

Third party radio (wireless) flash control triggers are partly supporting i-TTL, but do not support the Nikon Creative Lighting System (CLS). See reviews.

- Tethered shooting with Nikon Camera Control Pro 2, Apple Aperture 3, Adobe Lightroom 3.0 and above or other partly free products including apps.
- Other accessories from Nikon and third parties, including protective cases and bags, eyepiece adapters and correction lenses, and underwater housings.

== Reception ==
Independent reviews and image comparisons at all ISO speeds in JPEG and RAW (with different lenses) are available.

DxO Labs awarded its sensor an overall score of 80.

== Filming ==
Nikon France used the D5100 for the production of the short film "Fragments". Nikon used the D5100 to film one of the television commercials for the camera itself, which feature actor and perennial Nikon pitchman Ashton Kutcher.

== See also ==
- List of Nikon F-mount lenses with integrated autofocus motor

Sensor	Class	1999	2000	2001	2002	2003	2004	2005	2006	2007	2008	2009	2010	2011	2012	2013	2014	2015	2016	2017	2018	2019	2020	2021	2022	2023	2024	2025	2026
FX (Full-frame)	Flagship											D3X ^{−P}																	
FX (Full-frame)	Flagship										D3 ^{−P}		D3S ^{−P}		D4		D4S		D5^{T}					D6^{T}					
FX (Full-frame)	Professional											D700 ^{−P}			D800/D800E			D810/D810A			D850 ^{AT}								
FX (Full-frame)	Enthusiast																Df												
FX (Full-frame)	Enthusiast																	D750 ^{A}					D780 ^{AT}						
FX (Full-frame)	Enthusiast															D600	D610												
DX (APS-C)	Flagship		D1^{−E}	D1X^{−E}				D2X^{−E}		D2Xs^{−E}																			
DX (APS-C)	Flagship		D1^{−E}	D1H ^{−E}			D2H^{−E}	D2Hs^{−E}																					
DX (APS-C)	Professional				D100^{−E}				D200^{−E}		D300^{−P}		D300S^{−P}						D500 ^{AT}										
DX (APS-C)	Enthusiast						D70^{−E}		D70s^{−E}	D80^{−E}		D90^{−E}		D7000 ^{−P}			D7100	D7200			D7500 ^{AT}								
DX (APS-C)	Upper-entry								D50^{−E}	D40X^{−E*}	D60^{−E*}		D5000^{A−P*}		D5100^{A−P*}	D5200^{A−P*}	D5300^{A*}	D5500^{AT*}		D5600 ^{AT*}									
DX (APS-C)	Entry-level									D40^{−E*}			D3000^{−E*}	D3100^{−P*}		D3200^{−P*}	D3300^{*}			D3400^{*}		D3500^{*}							
Early models		SVC (prototype; 1986); QV-1000C (1988); NASA F4 (1991); E2/E2S (1995); E2N/E2NS (1996); E3/E3S (1998)																											
Sensor	Class																												
Sensor	Class	1999	2000	2001	2002	2003	2004	2005	2006	2007	2008	2009	2010	2011	2012	2013	2014	2015	2016	2017	2018	2019	2020	2021	2022	2023	2024	2025	2026
