= Nikon D5200 =

Digital single-lens reflex camera

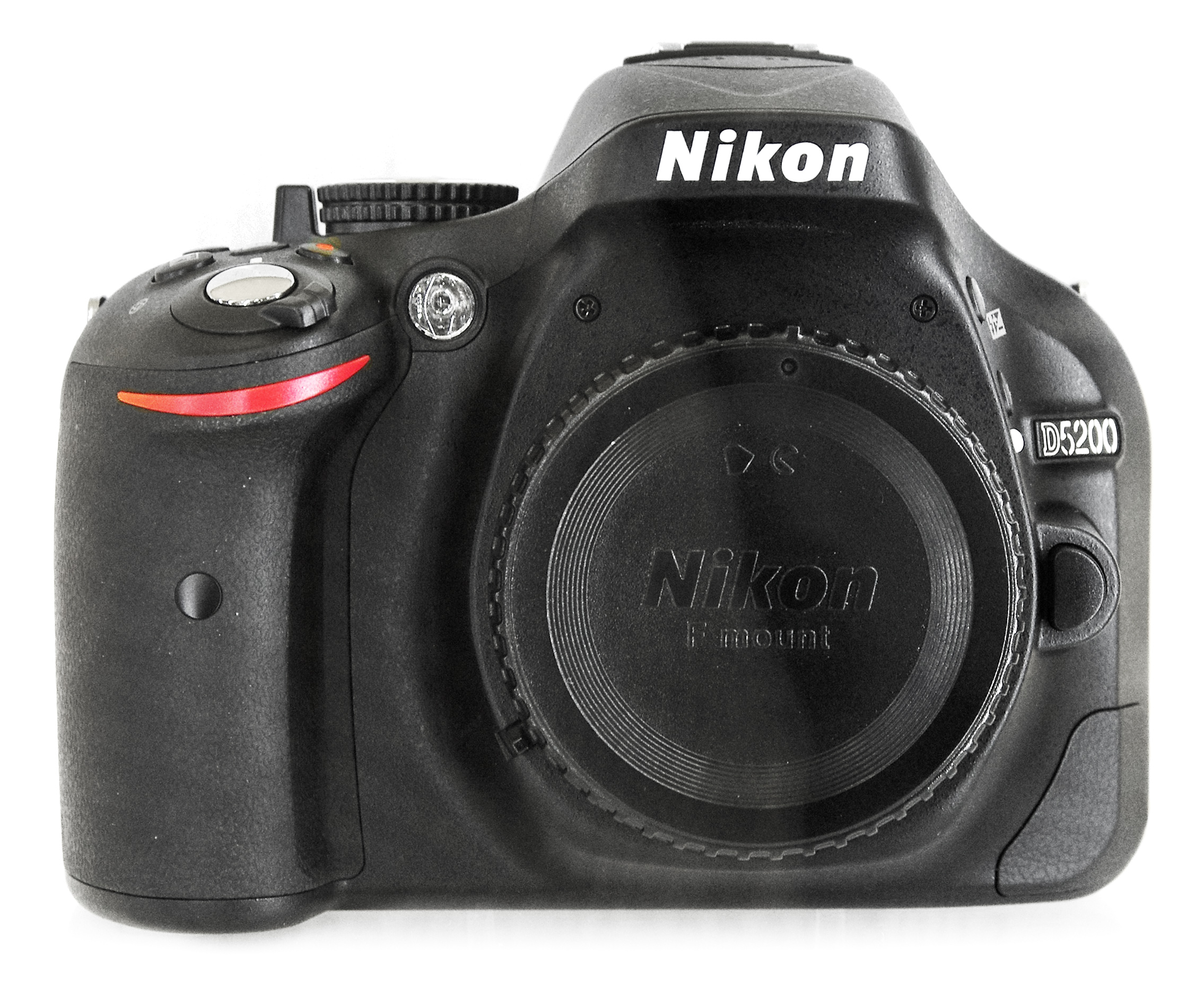

Overview
- Maker: Nikon
- Type: Digital single-lens reflex

Lens
- Lens: Interchangeble, Nikon F-mount

Sensor/medium
- Sensor: 23.5 mm × 15.6 mm Nikon DX format RGB CMOS sensor, 1.5× FOV crop
- Maximum resolution: 6,000×4,000 (24 effective megapixels)
- Film speed: 100–6400 in 1/3 EV steps, up to 25,600 as high-boost.
- Storage media: Secure Digital, SDHC, SDXC compatible. Supports UHS-I cards.

Focusing
- Focus modes: Instant single-servo (AF-S); continuous-servo (AF-C); auto AF-S/AF-C selection (AF-A); manual (M)
- Focus areas: 39-area AF system, Nikon Multi-CAM 4800DX sensor module

Exposure/metering
- Exposure modes: Auto modes (auto, auto [flash off]), Advanced Scene Modes (Portrait, Landscape, Child, Sports, Close-up, Night Portrait, Night Landscape, Party/Indoor, Beach/Snow, Sunset, Dusk/Dawn, Pet Portrait, Candlelight, Blossom, Autumn Colours, Food), programmed auto with flexible program (P), shutter-priority auto (S), aperture-priority auto (A), manual (M), Special Effects Modes (Night Vision, Colour Sketch, Miniature Effect, Selective Colour, Silhouette, High Key, Low Key).
- Exposure metering: TTL 3D Color Matrix Metering II metering with a 2016-pixel RGB sensor
- Metering modes: 3D Color Matrix Metering II, Center-weighted and Spot

Flash
- Flash: Built in Pop-up, Guide number 13m at ISO 100, Standard ISO hotshoe, Compatible with the Nikon Creative Lighting System

Shutter
- Shutter: Electronically controlled vertical-travel focal-plane shutter
- Shutter speed range: 30 s to 1/4000 s in 1/2 or 1/3 stops and Bulb, 1/200 s X-sync
- Continuous shooting: 5 frames per second

Viewfinder
- Viewfinder: Optical 0.78x, 95% Pentamirror

Image processing
- White balance: Auto, Incandescent, Fluorescent, Sunlight, Flash, Cloudy, Shade, Preset manual

General
- Video recording: 1920×1080, 60i (59.94 fields/s)/50i (50 fields/s), 30/25/24P (progressive), 1280×720, 60p/50p, 640×368, 30p/25p; High or Normal bitrate modes
- LCD screen: vari-angle 921,000 dot color TFT LCD screen
- Battery: Nikon EN-EL14 Lithium-Ion battery
- Weight: Approx. 505 g (1 b. 1.8 oz) body only
- Latest firmware: 1.03 / 15 September 2015; 11 years ago
- Made in: Thailand

Chronology
- Predecessor: Nikon D5100
- Successor: Nikon D5300

The Nikon D5200 is an F-mount DSLR camera with a newly developed 24.1-megapixel DX-format CMOS image sensor first announced by Nikon on November 6, 2012 for most of the world and January 7, 2013 for the North American market.

The Toshiba TOS-5105 (HEZ1) APS-C CMOS Image Sensor features 14-bit resolution NEF (RAW) and ISO 6400, expandable to 25,600. The D5200 integrates the same Multi-CAM 4800DX autofocus system as the D7000. The camera replaces the D5100 and is replaced by the Nikon D5300.

Initially, the camera was available worldwide except in North America. While Nikon officially announced the D5200 in Europe, Asia, and Australia in November 2012, Nikon's U.S. operating company did not initially announce the camera, and did not update its website to include this model. The official North American launch came during the CES show in Las Vegas, on January 13, 2013.

== Feature list ==
- Nikon EXPEED 3 image/video processor.
- Toshiba TOS-5105 24.1 MP Image Sensor
- Automatic correction of lateral chromatic aberration for JPEGs. Correction-data is additionally stored in RAW-files and used by Nikon Capture NX, View NX and some other RAW tools.
- HD video mode with autofocus. Up to 1080p at 24, 25 and 50i, 30 and 60i, 720p at 50 or 60 frames per second (fps). H.264/MPEG-4 AVC Expeed video processor. HDMI out with support of uncompressed video (clean HDMI)
- Active D-Lighting (4 level and auto).
- 3.0-inch (76 mm) articulated 921,000-dot LCD.
- Live View shooting mode with Contrast Detect and face priority auto focus (activated with a dedicated button).
- Continuous Drive up to 5 frames per second. Interval timer supported.
- Bracketing (exposure, Active D-Lighting and white-balance).
- Auto scene recognition mode with 16 pre-programmed scenes.
- In camera HDR mode.
- Inbuilt time-lapse photography intervalometer
- Quiet shooting mode.
- Built-in sensor cleaning system (vibrating low-pass filter) and airflow control system.
- HDMI HD video output.
- Stereo microphone input (has stereo built-in mic)
- Enhanced built-in RAW processing with extended Retouch menu for image processing without using a computer: D-Lighting, Red-eye reduction, Trimming, Monochrome & filter effects, Color balance, Image overlay, NEF (RAW) processing, Quick retouch, Straighten, Distortion control, Fisheye, Color outline, Color sketch, Perspective control, Miniature effect, Selective Color, Edit movie, Side-by-side comparison.
- File formats: JPEG, NEF (Nikon's RAW, 14-bit compressed), H.264 video codec.
- Compatible with WLAN Adaptor WU-1a to transmit images from the camera to Apple IOS or Android smart phone or tablet computer with remote shooting control.
- EN-EL14 Lithium-ion Battery.
- GPS interface for direct geotagging supported by Nikon GP-1 tag.

Like Nikon's other consumer level DSLRs, the D5200 has no in-body autofocus motor, and fully automatic autofocus requires one of the current 162 lenses with an integrated autofocus motor. With any other lenses the camera's electronic rangefinder (which indicates if the subject inside the selected focus point is in focus or not) can be used to manually adjust focus.

The D5200 can mount unmodified A-lenses (also called Non-AI, Pre-AI or F-type) with support of the electronic rangefinder and without metering.

== Firmware update ==
Nikon released a firmware update Ver. 1.01 for the D5200 on 14 November 2013. The update added support for EN-EL14a Rechargeable Li-ion Battery in the D5200. Another firmware update Ver. 1.02 was released on 21 January 2014 adding support for retractable lenses and providing bug fixes. Firmware Ver. 1.03 was released on 15 Sep 2015 fixing issues related to video framerate, and sensor cleaning bugs.

== See also ==
- List of Nikon F-mount lenses with integrated autofocus motors

Sensor	Class	1999	2000	2001	2002	2003	2004	2005	2006	2007	2008	2009	2010	2011	2012	2013	2014	2015	2016	2017	2018	2019	2020	2021	2022	2023	2024	2025	2026
FX (Full-frame)	Flagship											D3X ^{−P}																	
FX (Full-frame)	Flagship										D3 ^{−P}		D3S ^{−P}		D4		D4S		D5^{T}					D6^{T}					
FX (Full-frame)	Professional											D700 ^{−P}			D800/D800E			D810/D810A			D850 ^{AT}								
FX (Full-frame)	Enthusiast																Df												
FX (Full-frame)	Enthusiast																	D750 ^{A}					D780 ^{AT}						
FX (Full-frame)	Enthusiast															D600	D610												
DX (APS-C)	Flagship		D1^{−E}	D1X^{−E}				D2X^{−E}		D2Xs^{−E}																			
DX (APS-C)	Flagship		D1^{−E}	D1H ^{−E}			D2H^{−E}	D2Hs^{−E}																					
DX (APS-C)	Professional				D100^{−E}				D200^{−E}		D300^{−P}		D300S^{−P}						D500 ^{AT}										
DX (APS-C)	Enthusiast						D70^{−E}		D70s^{−E}	D80^{−E}		D90^{−E}		D7000 ^{−P}			D7100	D7200			D7500 ^{AT}								
DX (APS-C)	Upper-entry								D50^{−E}	D40X^{−E*}	D60^{−E*}		D5000^{A−P*}		D5100^{A−P*}	D5200^{A−P*}	D5300^{A*}	D5500^{AT*}		D5600 ^{AT*}									
DX (APS-C)	Entry-level									D40^{−E*}			D3000^{−E*}	D3100^{−P*}		D3200^{−P*}	D3300^{*}			D3400^{*}		D3500^{*}							
Early models		SVC (prototype; 1986); QV-1000C (1988); NASA F4 (1991); E2/E2S (1995); E2N/E2NS (1996); E3/E3S (1998)																											
Sensor	Class																												
Sensor	Class	1999	2000	2001	2002	2003	2004	2005	2006	2007	2008	2009	2010	2011	2012	2013	2014	2015	2016	2017	2018	2019	2020	2021	2022	2023	2024	2025	2026
