= Socionext =

SoC company

Socionext Inc.
- Native name: 株式会社ソシオネクスト
- Type: Public KK
- Traded as: TYO: 6526
- Industry: Semiconductor
- Founded: March 1, 2015; 11 years ago Yokohama, Japan
- Headquarters: Nomura Real Estate Shin-Yokohama Building; 2-10-23 Shin-Yokohama, Kōhoku-ku, Yokohama, Japan
- Areas served: Asia; Austria; China; Europe; Japan; South Korea; North America
- Key people: Masahiro Koezuka (CEO); Amane Inoue (President, COO); Kenji Ushida (CFO); Yoshifumi Okamoto (CTO); Tsutomu Nozaki (CMO)
- Products: Custom SoCs; Application-specific standard products (ASSP)
- Total equity: ¥33.0 billion (2026)
- Number of employees: 2,500 (2023)
- Website: www.socionext.com/en/

Socionext (株式会社ソシオネクスト, Kabushiki-kaisha Soshionekusuto) is a system on a chip (SoC) company formed in March 2015 from former system LSI businesses of Fujitsu and Panasonic. It has about 2,500 employees worldwide and is headquartered in Yokohama, Japan. It was privately held by the Development Bank of Japan (DBJ) (40%), Fujitsu (40%), and Panasonic (20%). After its founding, Socionext lost some of its top engineers to Acacia Communications in August 2016.

Socionext Europe is headquartered in Langen, near Frankfurt, with other locations in Munich, Maidenhead (UK) and Linz (Austria). The Design and Support Center is located in Munich, where the IP Development & Engineering Center is located in Maidenhead (UK).

Socionext America Inc. (SNA) is the US branch of Socionext Inc. headquartered in Milpitas, California. The company is a fabless ASIC supplier, specializing in a wide range of standard and customizable SoC solutions for automotive, consumer, and industrial markets.

On 1 January 2016, Socionext Inc. acquired the U.S. supplier Bayside Design Inc. (BDI) through Socionext America Inc.

In July 2018, Socionext signed a patent license agreement with Rambus to use its technology in memory controllers and security applications.

On 12 October 2022, Socionext went public in an IPO to list its shares on the Tokyo Stock Exchange Prime Market.

On 29 May 2023, Socionext released the new SC1260 Series automotive radio frequency ranging sensors.

On 5 July 2023, Socionext announced that the board of directors approved a secondary offering of shares of common stock of the company in the international markets. As a result, DBJ, Fujitsu, and Panasonic Holdings sold all of their shares (37.5% of total shares outstanding as of 31 March 2023).
