= Nikon D5500 =

Digital single-lens reflex camera

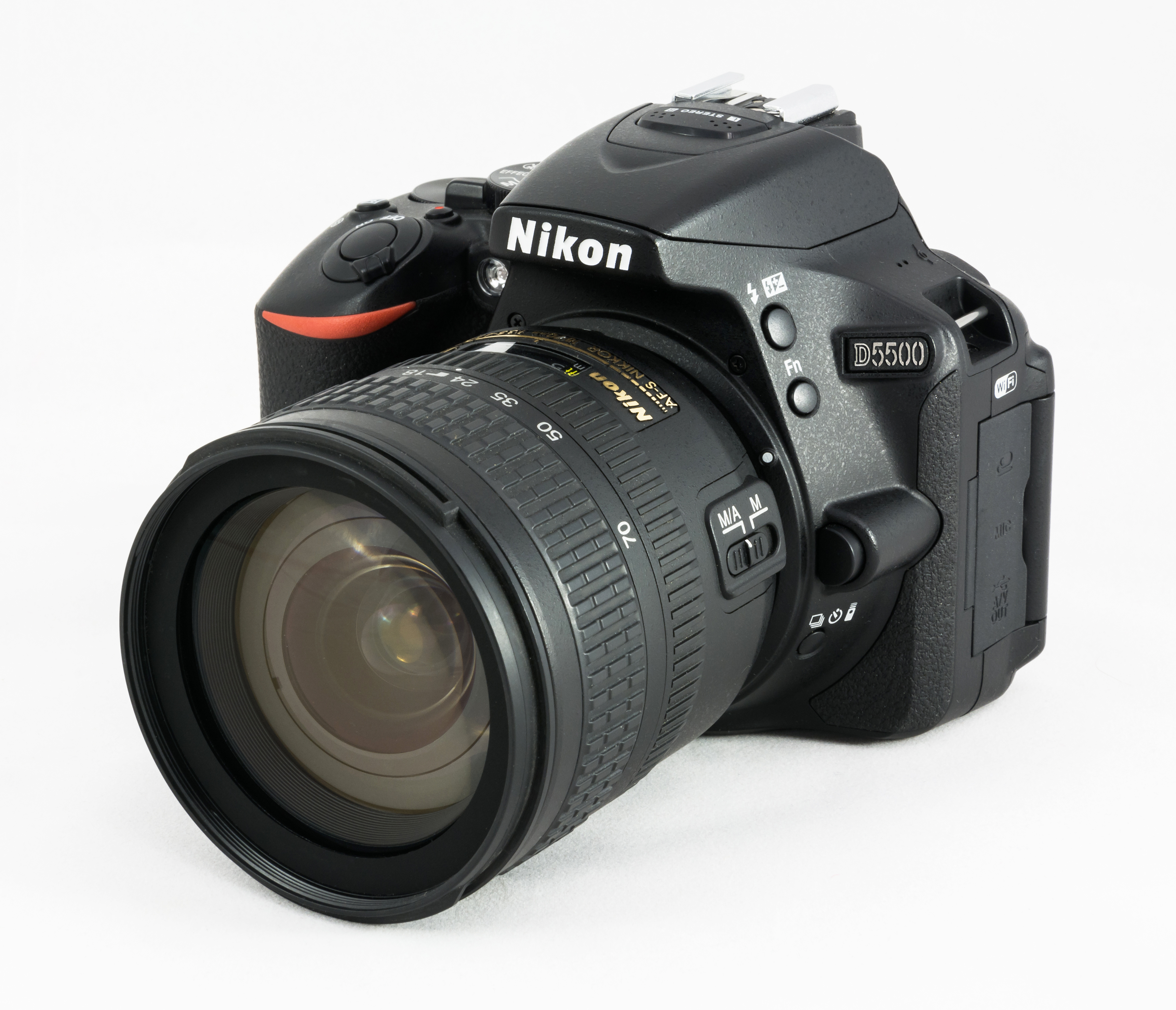

Overview
- Maker: Nikon
- Type: Digital single-lens reflex

Lens
- Lens: Interchangeable, Nikon F-mount

Sensor/medium
- Sensor: 23.5 mm × 15.6 mm Nikon DX format RGB CMOS sensor, 1.5 × FOV crop
- Maximum resolution: 6000 × 4000 pixels (24.2 megapixels)
- Recording medium: Secure Digital, SDSC, SDHC, SDXC, supports UHS-I bus.

Shutter
- Shutter speed range: 1/4000 to 30 s
- Continuous shooting: 5 fps

General
- Battery: Nikon EN-EL14A Lithium-Ion
- AV port(s): Mini-HDMI for video, 3.5mm stereo jack for microphone
- Data port(s): USB (proprietary), 802.11b/g Wi-Fi
- Weight: 420 g (14.8 oz) body only
- Latest firmware: 1.02 / 9 May 2017; 8 years ago
- Made in: Thailand

Chronology
- Predecessor: Nikon D5300
- Successor: Nikon D5600

The Nikon D5500 is an F-mount DSLR released by Nikon on January 5, 2015. As the successor to the D5300 (with no D5400 in between), this was the first Nikon DSLR to feature a touchscreen.

The Nikon D5500 features a carbon-fiber composite body, weighs 60 grams less than its predecessor (the D5300), and has a touchscreen as well as Wi-Fi. It lacks NFC (near field communication) connectivity and GPS functionality.

The Nikon D5500 is a compact DSLR containing a 24.2 megapixel sensor with no optical low-pass filter. It also features a touchscreen LCD and a lightweight design. It includes a 39-point autofocus system and ability to shoot up to 5 frames per second, as well as built-in Wi-Fi capabilities.

A review by Camera Decision highlighted the bigger buffer for raw files and the longer battery life.

The D5500 was superseded by the D5600 in late 2016.

== Features ==
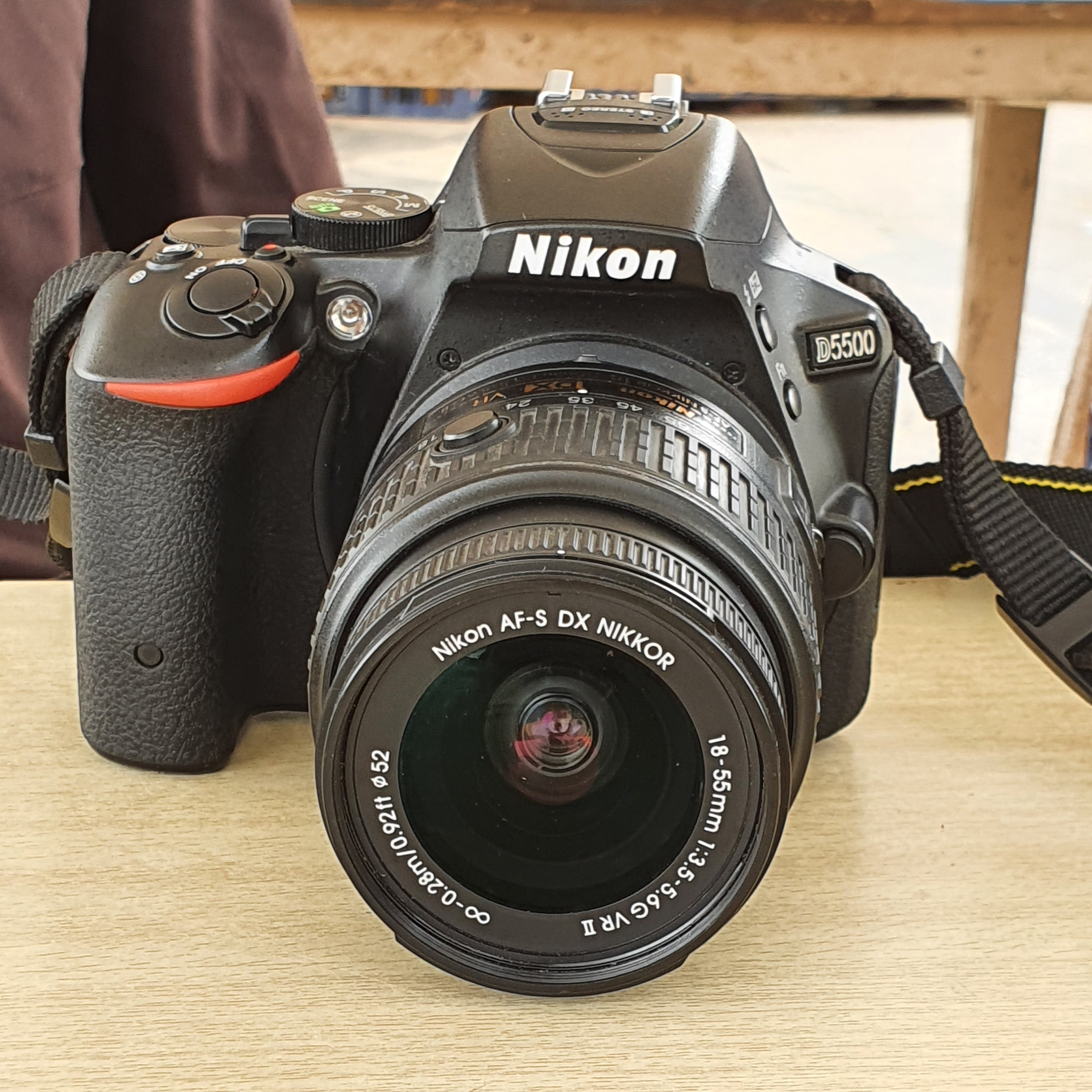
A black Nikon D5500

- 24.2MP CMOS sensor with no optical low-pass filter
- Ultra-compact and lightweight body
- Multi-CAM 4800DX 39-point autofocus system
- 2,016-pixel RGB metering sensor, used for 3D subject tracking in AF-C
- Sensitivity range of ISO 100–25,600
- 5 fps continuous shooting
- 1/4000 sec maximum shutter speed
- 3.2", 1.2M dot fully articulating touchscreen LCD
- 1080/60p video with clean output over HDMI and Flat Picture Control
- Built-in Wi-Fi

== See also ==
- List of Nikon F-mount lenses with integrated autofocus motor

Sensor	Class	'99	'00	'01	'02	'03	'04	'05	'06	'07	'08	'09	'10	'11	'12	'13	'14	'15	'16	'17	'18	'19	'20	'21	'22	'23	'24	'25	'26
FX (Full-frame)	Flagship											D3X ^{−P}																	
FX (Full-frame)	Flagship										D3 ^{−P}		D3S ^{−P}		D4		D4S		D5^{T}					D6^{T}					
FX (Full-frame)	Professional											D700 ^{−P}			D800/D800E			D810/D810A			D850 ^{AT}								
FX (Full-frame)	Enthusiast																Df												
FX (Full-frame)	Enthusiast																	D750 ^{A}					D780 ^{AT}						
FX (Full-frame)	Enthusiast															D600	D610												
DX (APS-C)	Flagship		D1^{−E}	D1X^{−E}				D2X^{−E}		D2Xs^{−E}																			
DX (APS-C)	Flagship		D1^{−E}	D1H ^{−E}			D2H^{−E}	D2Hs^{−E}																					
DX (APS-C)	Professional				D100^{−E}				D200^{−E}		D300^{−P}		D300S^{−P}						D500 ^{AT}										
DX (APS-C)	Enthusiast						D70^{−E}		D70s^{−E}	D80^{−E}		D90^{−E}		D7000 ^{−P}			D7100	D7200			D7500 ^{AT}								
DX (APS-C)	Upper-entry								D50^{−E}	D40X^{−E*}	D60^{−E*}		D5000^{A−P*}		D5100^{A−P*}	D5200^{A−P*}	D5300^{A*}	D5500^{AT*}		D5600 ^{AT*}									
DX (APS-C)	Entry-level									D40^{−E*}			D3000^{−E*}	D3100^{−P*}		D3200^{−P*}	D3300^{*}			D3400^{*}		D3500^{*}							
Early models		SVC (prototype; 1986); QV-1000C (1988); NASA F4 (1991); E2/E2S (1995); E2N/E2NS (1996); E3/E3S (1998)																											
Sensor	Class																												
Sensor	Class	'99	'00	'01	'02	'03	'04	'05	'06	'07	'08	'09	'10	'11	'12	'13	'14	'15	'16	'17	'18	'19	'20	'21	'22	'23	'24	'25	'26
