= Nikon D7100 =

Digital single-lens reflex camera

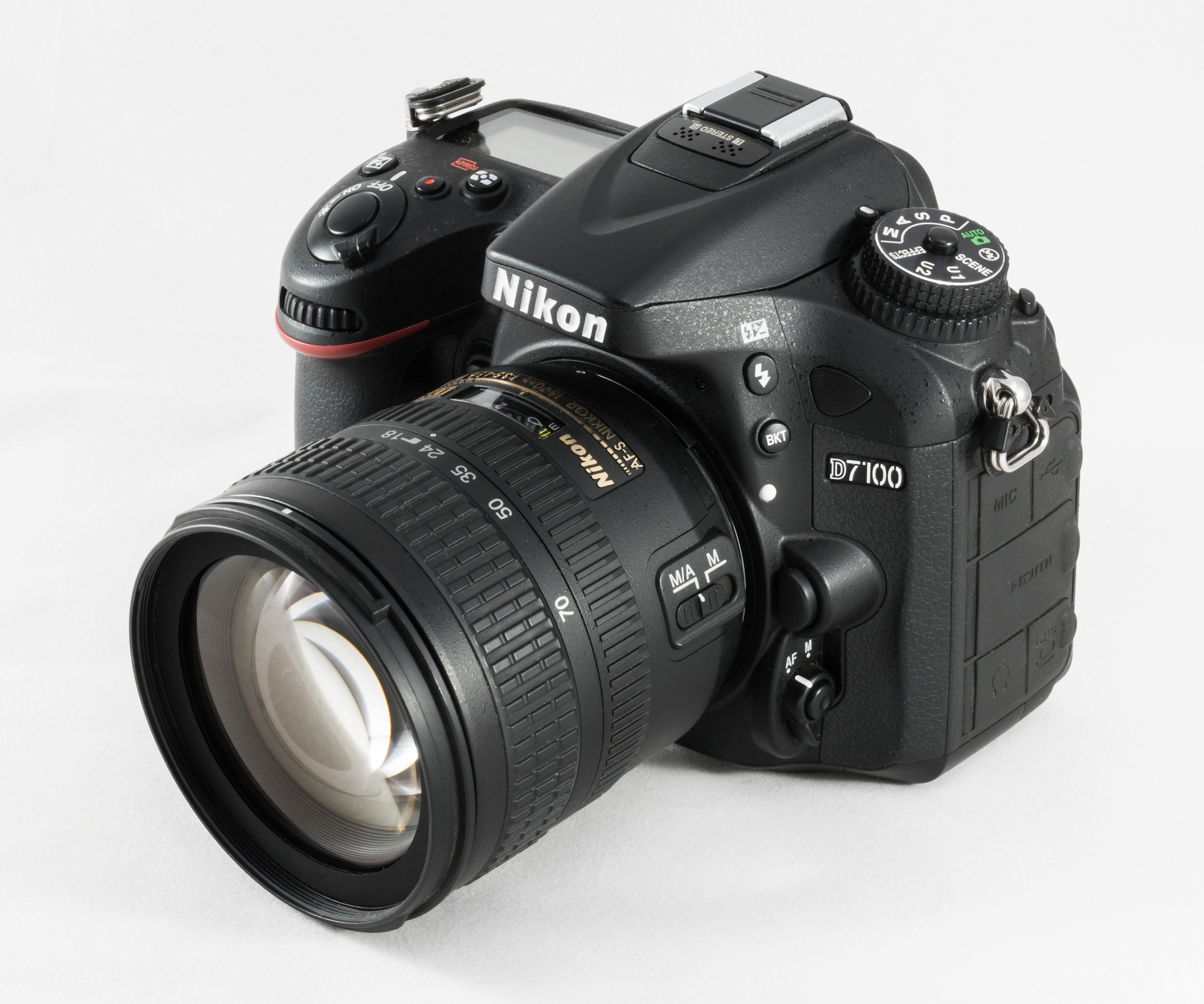

Overview
- Maker: Nikon
- Type: Digital single-lens reflex
- Released: 21 February 2013
- Intro price: $949.95 (body only)

Lens
- Lens: Interchangeable, Nikon F-mount

Sensor/medium
- Sensor: 23.5 mm × 15.6 mm Nikon DX format RGB CMOS sensor, 1.5 × FOV crop
- Maximum resolution: 6000 × 4000 pixels (24.1 megapixels)
- Film speed: ISO 100–6400 in 1/3 EV steps, up to 25600 with Hi (boost) menu item
- Recording medium: Secure Digital, SDHC, SDXC compatible (dual slot, UHS-I protocol support)

Focusing
- Focus: Manual, Auto, Focus-lock, Electronic rangefinder, Live preview and video modes: Subject-tracking, Face-priority, Wide-area, Normal-Area
- Focus modes: Instant single-servo (AF-S); continuous-servo (AF-C); auto AF-S/AF-C selection (AF-A); Full time AF (AF-F); manual (M)
- Focus areas: 51-area AF system, Multi-CAM 3500DX AF Sensor Module; Area modes: 3D-tracking, Auto-area, Dynamic-area, Single-point

Exposure/metering
- Exposure modes: Auto modes (auto, auto [flash off]), Advanced Scene Modes (Portrait, Landscape, Sports, Close-up, Night Portrait), programmed auto with flexible program (P), shutter-priority auto (S), aperture-priority auto (A), manual (M), quiet (Q) and Effect mode.
- Exposure metering: TTL 3D Color Matrix Metering II metering with a 2,016 pixel RGB sensor
- Metering modes: 3D Color Matrix Metering II, Center-weighted and Spot

Flash
- Flash: Built in Pop-up, Guide number 12m at ISO 100, Standard ISO hotshoe, Compatible with the Nikon Creative Lighting System, featuring commander mode for wireless setups
- Flash bracketing: 2 or 3 frames in steps of 1/3, 1/2, 2/3, 1 or 2 EV

Shutter
- Shutter: Electronically-controlled vertical-travel focal-plane shutter
- Shutter speed range: 30 s to 1/8000 s in 1/2 or 1/3 stops and Bulb, 1/250 s X-sync
- Continuous shooting: 6 frame/s or 7 frame/s in 1.3x crop mode

Viewfinder
- Viewfinder: Optical 0.94× Pentaprism, 100% coverage

Image processing
- White balance: Auto, Incandescent, Fluorescent, Sunlight, Flash, Cloudy, Shade, Kelvin temperature, Preset

General
- LCD screen: 3.2-inch 1,228,800 dots TFT-LCD
- Battery: Nikon EN-EL15 Lithium-Ion battery (14Wh)
- Optional battery packs: Nikon MB-D15 battery grip
- Weight: Approx. 675 g (1.488 lb)
- Latest firmware: 1.05 / 26 July 2022; 3 years ago
- Made in: Thailand

Chronology
- Predecessor: Nikon D7000
- Successor: Nikon D7200

References
- Nikon D7100 product homepage

The Nikon D7100 is a 24.1-megapixel digital single-lens reflex camera model announced by Nikon in February 2013. It is a 'prosumer' model that replaces the Nikon D7000 as Nikon's flagship DX-format camera, fitting between the company's entry-level and professional DSLR models. This camera is the first ever from Nikon with no optical low-pass filter incorporated. At launch, Nikon gave the D7100 estimated selling price in the United States as US$ 949.95 for the body.

== Features ==
- 24.1 effective megapixel CMOS, Nikon DX format image sensor, without an optical low-pass filter
- Nikon EXPEED 3 image-processing engine;
- Advanced Multi-CAM 3500DX autofocus sensor module with 51 focus points;
- 3D Color Matrix Metering II 2,016-pixel RGB sensor;
- HD video mode with autofocus. Up to 1080p at 24p, 25p and 50i (50i true interlaced: based on 50 sensor readouts per second), 30p and 60i (60i true interlaced), 720p at 50p or 60p frames per second (fps). H.264/MPEG-4 AVC Expeed video processor. HDMI out with support of uncompressed video (clean HDMI)
- ISO sensitivity 100 to 6400 (up to 25600 with boost);
- 3.2-inch, TFT LCD monitor with 1,228,800-dot resolution (RGBW alignment);
- Central cross-type focus points support autofocusing with lenses with a maximum aperture of f/5.6;
- Center cross-type focus point supports autofocusing with lenses with a maximum aperture of f/8;
- DX-sized sensor with 1.5x crop factor; (additional 1.3x crop mode available)
- Viewfinder with approximately 100% frame coverage and 0.94x magnification ratio;
- GPS interface for direct geotagging supported by Nikon GP-1.

== Video performance ==
- When using the D7100 as a video capture mode, the camera will display audio meter overlays over the left edge of the LCD.
- The D7100 does not allow the lens aperture to be adjusted during video capture.
- The slowest shutter speed in video capture mode appears to be 1/25th of a second.

== Advantages and disadvantages ==
The sensor of the D7100 uses Nikon's DX format, resulting in a crop factor of 1.5x. Additionally the software enables an additional crop of 1.3x (resulting in approximately 1.95x compared to 35mm). Selecting this additional crop mode allows faster focusing in video mode and also enables interlaced video recording modes. This additional crop feature gives D7100 an advantage in using tele angle lens for shooting wildlife or things at a distance. The 51-area AF system sensors covers a bigger proportion of the extra 1.3 crop factor image area, which is important for capturing high-speed moving subjects during shooting.

Sensor	Class	'01	'02	'03	'04	'05	'06	'07	'08	'09	'10	'11	'12	'13	'14	'15	'16	'17	'18	'19	'20	'21	'22	'23	'24	'25	'26
FX (Full-frame)	Flagship									D3X ^{−P}																	
FX (Full-frame)	Flagship								D3 ^{−P}		D3S ^{−P}		D4		D4S		D5^{T}					D6^{T}					
FX (Full-frame)	Professional									D700 ^{−P}			D800/D800E			D810/D810A			D850 ^{AT}								
FX (Full-frame)	Enthusiast														Df												
FX (Full-frame)	Enthusiast															D750 ^{A}					D780 ^{AT}						
FX (Full-frame)	Enthusiast													D600	D610												
DX (APS-C)	Flagship	D1X^{−E}				D2X^{−E}		D2Xs^{−E}																			
DX (APS-C)	Flagship	D1H ^{−E}			D2H^{−E}	D2Hs^{−E}																					
DX (APS-C)	Professional		D100^{−E}				D200^{−E}		D300^{−P}		D300S^{−P}						D500 ^{AT}										
DX (APS-C)	Enthusiast				D70^{−E}		D70s^{−E}	D80^{−E}		D90^{−E}		D7000 ^{−P}			D7100	D7200			D7500 ^{AT}								
DX (APS-C)	Upper-entry						D50^{−E}	D40X^{−E*}	D60^{−E*}		D5000^{A−P*}		D5100^{A−P*}	D5200^{A−P*}	D5300^{A*}	D5500^{AT*}		D5600 ^{AT*}									
DX (APS-C)	Entry-level							D40^{−E*}			D3000^{−E*}	D3100^{−P*}		D3200^{−P*}	D3300^{*}			D3400^{*}		D3500^{*}							
Early models		Nikon SVC (prototype; 1986); Nikon QV-1000C (1988); Nikon NASA F4 (1991); Nikon E2/E2S (1995); Nikon E2N/E2NS (1996); Nikon E3/E3S (1998); D1 (1999)																									
Sensor	Class																										
Sensor	Class	'01	'02	'03	'04	'05	'06	'07	'08	'09	'10	'11	'12	'13	'14	'15	'16	'17	'18	'19	'20	'21	'22	'23	'24	'25	'26
