= Nikon D3100 =

2010 APS-C digital single-lens reflex camera

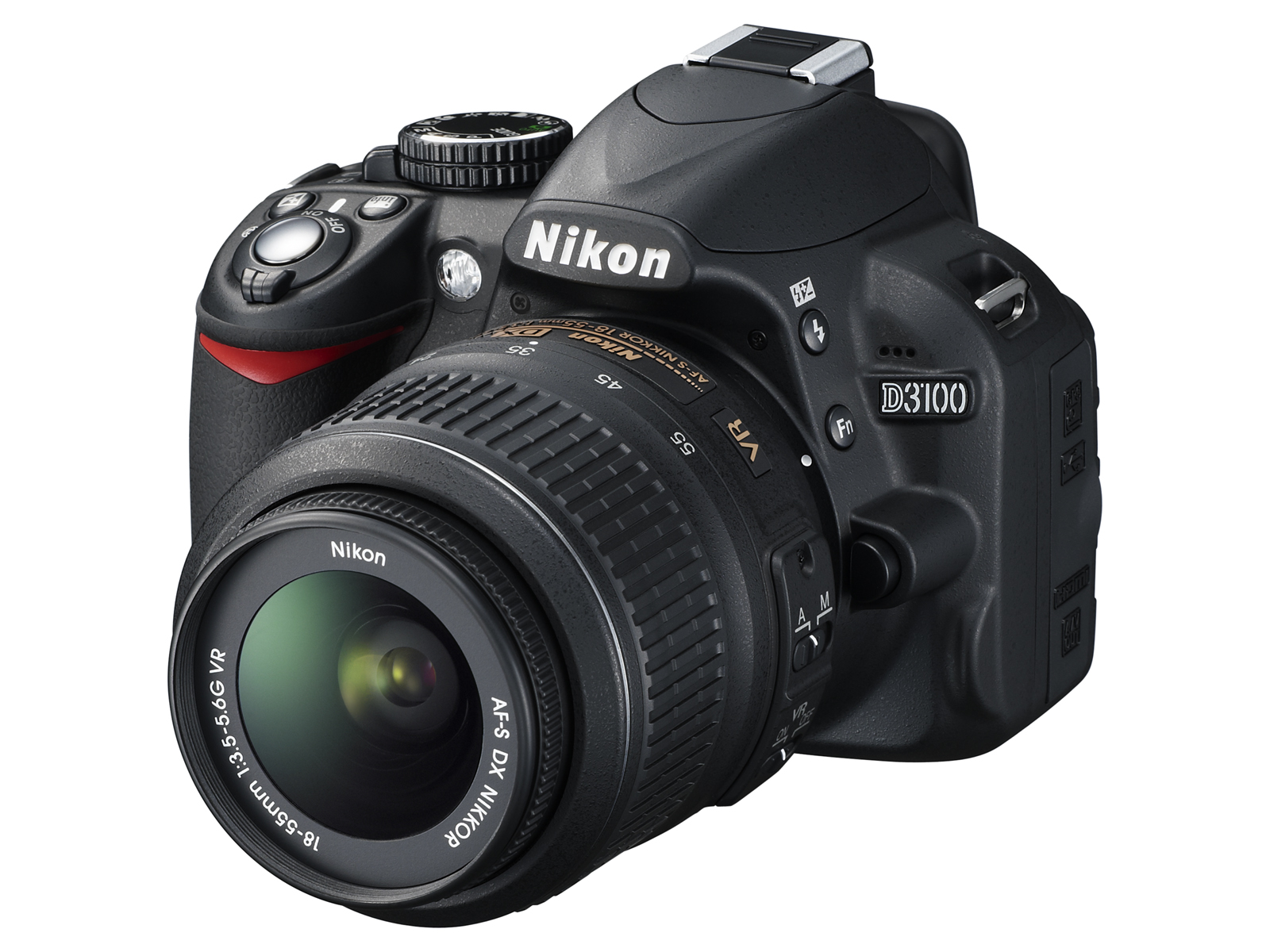
- Nikon D3100 with the Nikon 18-55mm zoom lens.

Overview
- Maker: Nikon
- Type: Digital single-lens reflex

Lens
- Lens: Interchangeable, Nikon F-mount

Sensor/medium
- Sensor: 23.1 mm × 15.4 mm Nikon DX format RGB CMOS sensor, 1.5 × FOV crop, 4.94 μm pixel size
- Sensor maker: Nikon
- Maximum resolution: 4,608 × 3,072 (14.2 effective megapixels)
- Film speed: 100–3200 in 1/3 EV steps, up to 12800 as boost
- Recording medium: Secure Digital, SDHC and SDXC compatible

Focusing
- Focus modes: AF-A (Auto-servo AF); AF-S (Single-servo AF); AF-C (Continuous-servo AF); MF (Manual focus).
- Focus areas: 11-area AF system, Multi-CAM 1000 AF Sensor Module

Exposure/metering
- Exposure modes: Auto modes (auto, auto [flash off]), Guide Mode, Advanced Scene Modes (Portrait, Landscape, Sports, Close-up, Night Portrait), programmed auto with flexible program (P), shutter-priority auto (S), aperture-priority auto (A), manual (M), (Q) quiet mode.
- Exposure metering: TTL 3D Color Matrix Metering II metering with a 420-pixel RGB sensor
- Metering modes: 3D Color Matrix Metering II, Center-weighted and Spot

Flash
- Flash: Built in Pop-up, Guide number 13m at ISO 100, Standard ISO hotshoe, Compatible with the Nikon Creative Lighting System
- Flash bracketing: 2 or 3 frames in steps of 1/3, 1/2, 2/3, 1 or 2 EV

Shutter
- Shutter: Electronically-controlled vertical-travel focal-plane shutter
- Shutter speed range: 30 s to 1/4000 s in 1/2 or 1/3 stops and Bulb, 1/200 s X-sync
- Continuous shooting: 3 frame/s

Viewfinder
- Viewfinder: Optical 0.80x, 95% Pentamirror

Image processing
- White balance: Auto, Incandescent, Fluorescent, Sunlight, Flash, Cloudy, Shade, Preset

General
- LCD screen: 3.0-inch 230,000 pixel TFT-LCD
- Battery: Nikon EN-EL14 rechargeable Lithium-Ion battery
- Weight: Approx. 455 g (1.003 lb) without battery, memory card or body cap
- Made in: Thailand

Chronology
- Predecessor: Nikon D3000
- Successor: Nikon D3200

The Nikon D3100 is a 14.2-megapixel DX format DSLR Nikon F-mount camera announced by Nikon on August 19, 2010. It replaced the D3000 as Nikon's entry level DSLR. It introduced Nikon's new EXPEED 2 image processor and was the first Nikon DSLR featuring full high-definition video recording with full-time autofocus and H.264 compression, instead of Motion JPEG compression. It was also the first Nikon DSLR to provide high-definition video recording at more than one frame rate.

Use is assisted by two Guide Modes: Easy Operation and Advanced Operation tutorial. On April 19, 2012, the D3200 superseded the D3100 as Nikon's entry-level DSLR.

== Features ==
- Nikon's 14.2-megapixel Nikon DX format CMOS sensor with 12 Bit Resolution.
- Nikon EXPEED 2 image processor.
- Active D-Lighting.
- Automatic chromatic aberration correction.
- Sensor cleaning and airflow control system.
- 3.0-inch 230,000-dot resolution fixed TFT LCD
- Continuous Drive up to 3 frames per second.
- Live view mode. Live view AF modes: Face priority, Wide area, Normal area, Subject tracking
- Full High Definition video recording (1080p for 10 minutes at 24 frames per second in H.264 codec), additionally 720p30/25/24 and 480p24
- Full-time autofocus in movie mode.
- 3D Color Matrix Metering II with Scene Recognition System.
- 3D Tracking Multi-CAM 1000 autofocus sensor module with 11 AF points.
- ISO sensitivity 100 to 3200 (6400 and 12800 with boost).
- Nikon F-mount lenses.
- i-TTL flash exposure system without built-in, but support for external wireless flash commander.
- Extended In-camera retouching: D-Lighting, Red-eye reduction, Trimming, Monochrome & filter effects, Color balance, Small picture, Image overlay, NEF (raw) processing, Quick retouch, Straighten, Distortion control, Fisheye, Color outline, Perspective control, Miniature effect, Edit movie
- File formats: JPEG, NEF (Nikon's raw, 12-bit compressed)
- Compatibility with SDXC memory cards

Like Nikon's other consumer-level DSLRs, the D3100 has no in-body autofocus motor, and fully automatic autofocus requires one of the currently 162 lenses with an integrated autofocus-motor. With any other lens, the camera's electronic rangefinder can be used to manually adjust focus.

Can mount unmodified A-lenses (also called Non-AI, Pre-AI or F-type) with support of the electronic rangefinder and without metering.

=== Optional accessories ===
The Nikon D3100 has available accessories such as:

- Nikon GP-1 GPS Unit for direct GPS geotagging. Third party solutions partly with 3-axis compass, data-logger, bluetooth and support for indoor use are available from Solmeta, Dawn, Easytag, Foolography, Gisteq and Phottix. See comparisons/reviews.
- Battery grip third party solutions are available.
- Nikon CF-DC1 Soft Case.
- Third party solutions for WLAN transmitter are available.
- Various Nikon Speedlight or third party flash units including devices with Nikon Creative Lighting System wireless flash commander or support for SU-800 Wireless Speedlight Commander.

Third party radio (wireless) flash control triggers are partly supporting i-TTL, but do not support the Nikon Creative Lighting System (CLS). See reviews.

- Common Optional Lens: AF-S DX NIKKOR 18-55mm f/3.5-5.6G VR, AF-S DX NIKKOR 18-105mm f/3.5-5.6G ED VR, AF NIKKOR 50mm f/1.8D. Note: Lenses without an internal autofocus motor can only use manual focus on the Nikon D3100.
- Other accessories from Nikon and third parties, include protective cases and bags, eyepiece adapters and correction lenses, and underwater housings.

== Reception ==
The D3100 has received many independent reviews and image comparisons at all ISO speeds.

The D3100 is the only known Nikon DSLR with an image sensor interface integrating analog-to-digital converters not made by Nikon: The result is a dynamic range only at the level of competitors like the (higher priced) Canon EOS 600D; lower than other current Nikon DSLRs.

== See also ==
- List of Nikon compatible lenses with integrated autofocus-motor

Sensor	Class	'01	'02	'03	'04	'05	'06	'07	'08	'09	'10	'11	'12	'13	'14	'15	'16	'17	'18	'19	'20	'21	'22	'23	'24	'25
FX (Full-frame)	Flagship									D3X ^{−P}																
FX (Full-frame)	Flagship								D3 ^{−P}		D3S ^{−P}		D4		D4S		D5^{T}					D6^{T}				
FX (Full-frame)	Professional									D700 ^{−P}			D800/D800E			D810/D810A			D850 ^{AT}							
FX (Full-frame)	Enthusiast														Df											
FX (Full-frame)	Enthusiast															D750 ^{A}					D780 ^{AT}					
FX (Full-frame)	Enthusiast													D600	D610											
DX (APS-C)	Flagship	D1X^{−E}				D2X^{−E}		D2Xs^{−E}																		
DX (APS-C)	Flagship	D1H ^{−E}			D2H^{−E}	D2Hs^{−E}																				
DX (APS-C)	Professional		D100^{−E}				D200^{−E}		D300^{−P}		D300S^{−P}						D500 ^{AT}									
DX (APS-C)	Enthusiast				D70^{−E}		D70s^{−E}	D80^{−E}		D90^{−E}		D7000 ^{−P}			D7100	D7200			D7500 ^{AT}							
DX (APS-C)	Upper-entry						D50^{−E}	D40X^{−E*}	D60^{−E*}		D5000^{A−P*}		D5100^{A−P*}	D5200^{A−P*}	D5300^{A*}	D5500^{AT*}		D5600 ^{AT*}								
DX (APS-C)	Entry-level							D40^{−E*}			D3000^{−E*}	D3100^{−P*}		D3200^{−P*}	D3300^{*}			D3400^{*}		D3500^{*}						
Early models		Nikon SVC (prototype; 1986); Nikon QV-1000C (1988); Nikon NASA F4 (1991); Nikon E2/E2S (1995); Nikon E2N/E2NS (1996); Nikon E3/E3S (1998); D1 (1999)																								
Sensor	Class																									
Sensor	Class	'01	'02	'03	'04	'05	'06	'07	'08	'09	'10	'11	'12	'13	'14	'15	'16	'17	'18	'19	'20	'21	'22	'23	'24	'25
