= Nikon AF-S DX Nikkor 35mm f/1.8G =

Camera lens

AF-S DX Nikkor 35mm f/1.8G
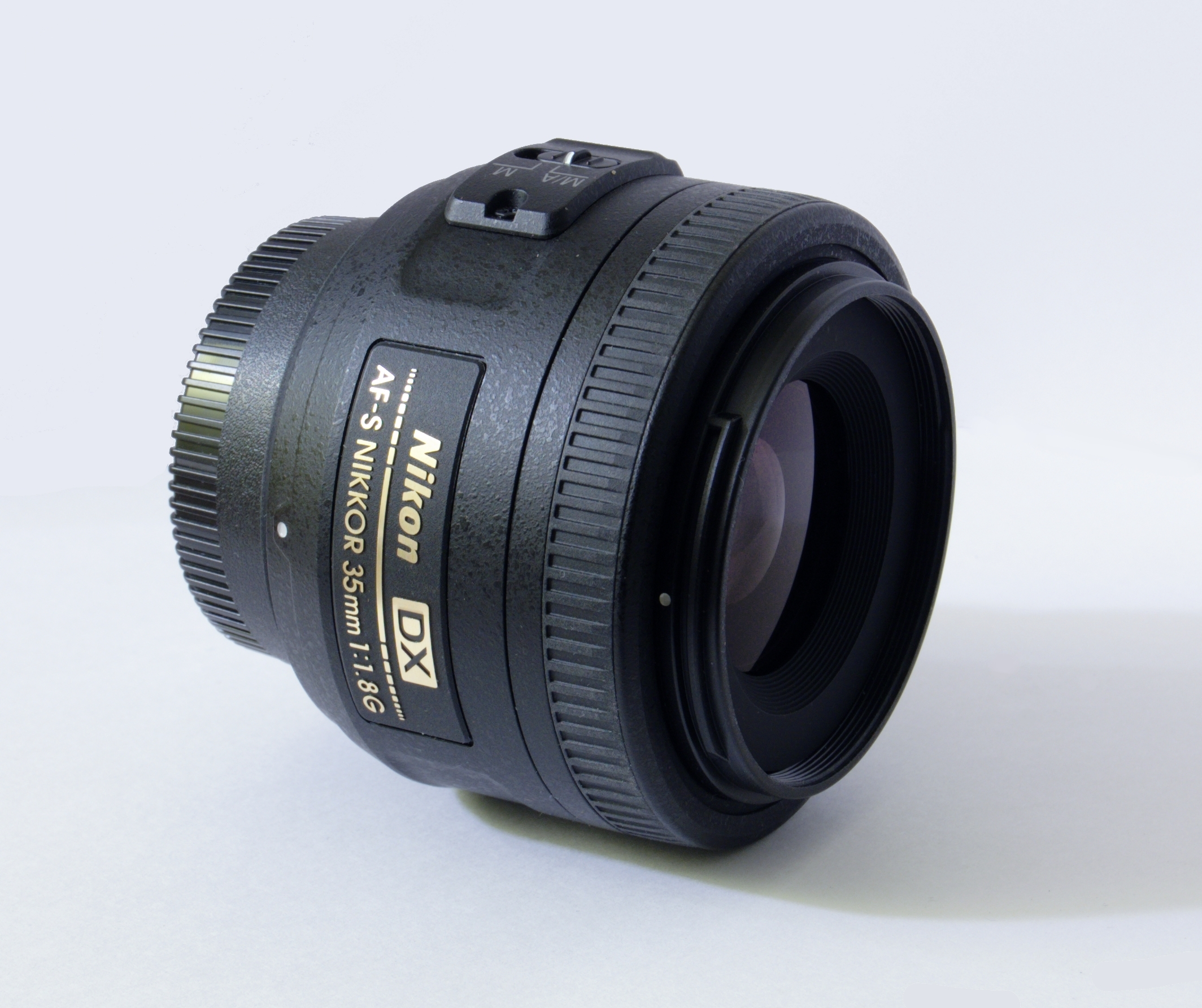
- Maker: Nikon
- Lens mount: F-mount

Technical data
- Type: Prime
- Focus drive: Silent wave motor
- Focal length: 35 mm
- Focal length (35mm equiv.): 52.5 mm
- Image format: DX (APS-C)
- Aperture (max/min): f/1.8–22
- Close focus distance: 0.30 m
- Max. magnification: 0.16x (1:6.25)
- Diaphragm blades: 7 (rounded)
- Construction: 8 elements in 6 groups

Features
- Lens-based stabilization: No No
- Macro capable: No No
- Aperture ring: No No

Physical
- Max. length: 52.5 mm
- Diameter: 70 mm
- Weight: 200 g
- Filter diameter: 52 mm

Accessories
- Lens hood: HB-46
- Case: CL-0913

Angle of view
- Horizontal: 37.8°
- Vertical: 25.8°
- Diagonal: 44.8° (with DX format)

History
- Introduction: February 2009

Retail info
- MSRP: 199 USD

The Nikon AF-S DX Nikkor 35mm f/1.8G is a lens manufactured by Nikon for use on Nikon DX format digital SLR cameras. It provides a field of view on a DX format camera similar to that of a normal lens on a 35mm film format camera.

== Introduction ==
Nikon announced the lens on 9 February 2009. It is the first prime lens released by Nikon specifically designed for Nikon DX format DSLR cameras that not only is rectilinear but also supports autofocus on the Nikon D40, D40X, D60, D3000, D3100, D3200, D3300, D3400, D3500, D5000, D5100, D5200, D5300, D5500, D5600 and D500. The first prime lens released for the DX format was the AF DX Fisheye-Nikkor 10.5mm f/2.8G ED.

It achieved a DXOMark score of 28.

== Features ==
- 35 mm focal length (approximately field of view equivalent to a 50 mm lens used on a 35mm format camera)
- Compact silent wave autofocus motor with full-time manual override
- Nikon F-mount lens for use with Nikon DX format DSLRs (although only a very small amount for this lens, use on Nikon FX format DSLRs will cause vignetting)
- Rear-focussing elements allow for a non-rotating lens front, enabling easier usage of rotating filters such as circular polarisers
- Dust gasket around lens mount to reduce dust entering when lens and camera are attached

== Construction ==
- 8 lens elements in 6 groups
- 1 hybrid aspherical element
- 52 mm filter thread for widely distributed 52 mm filters

== Target market ==
The lens is intended to be an inexpensive prime lens for owners of Nikon DX format DSLR cameras. The lens was priced at US$180 in 2020.

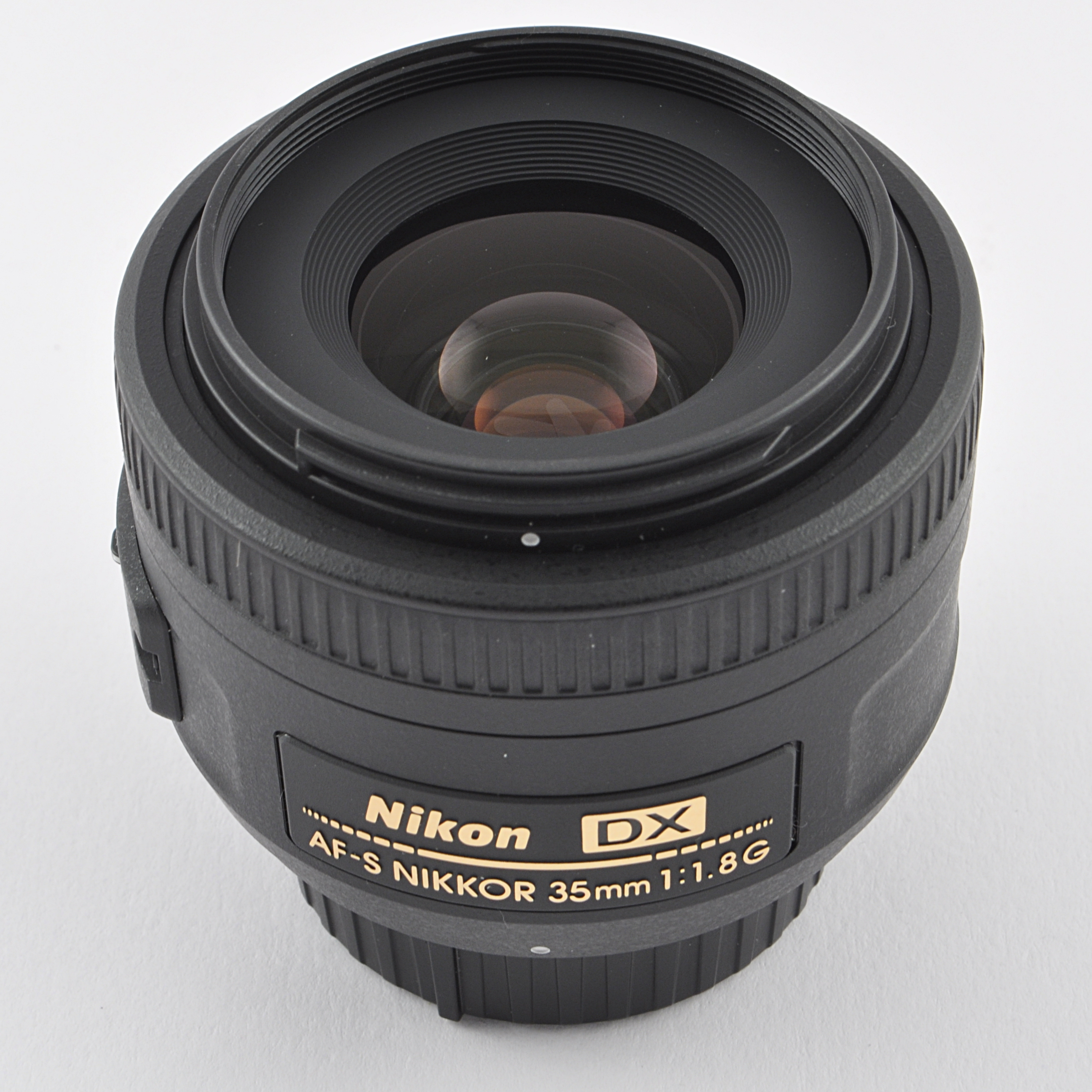

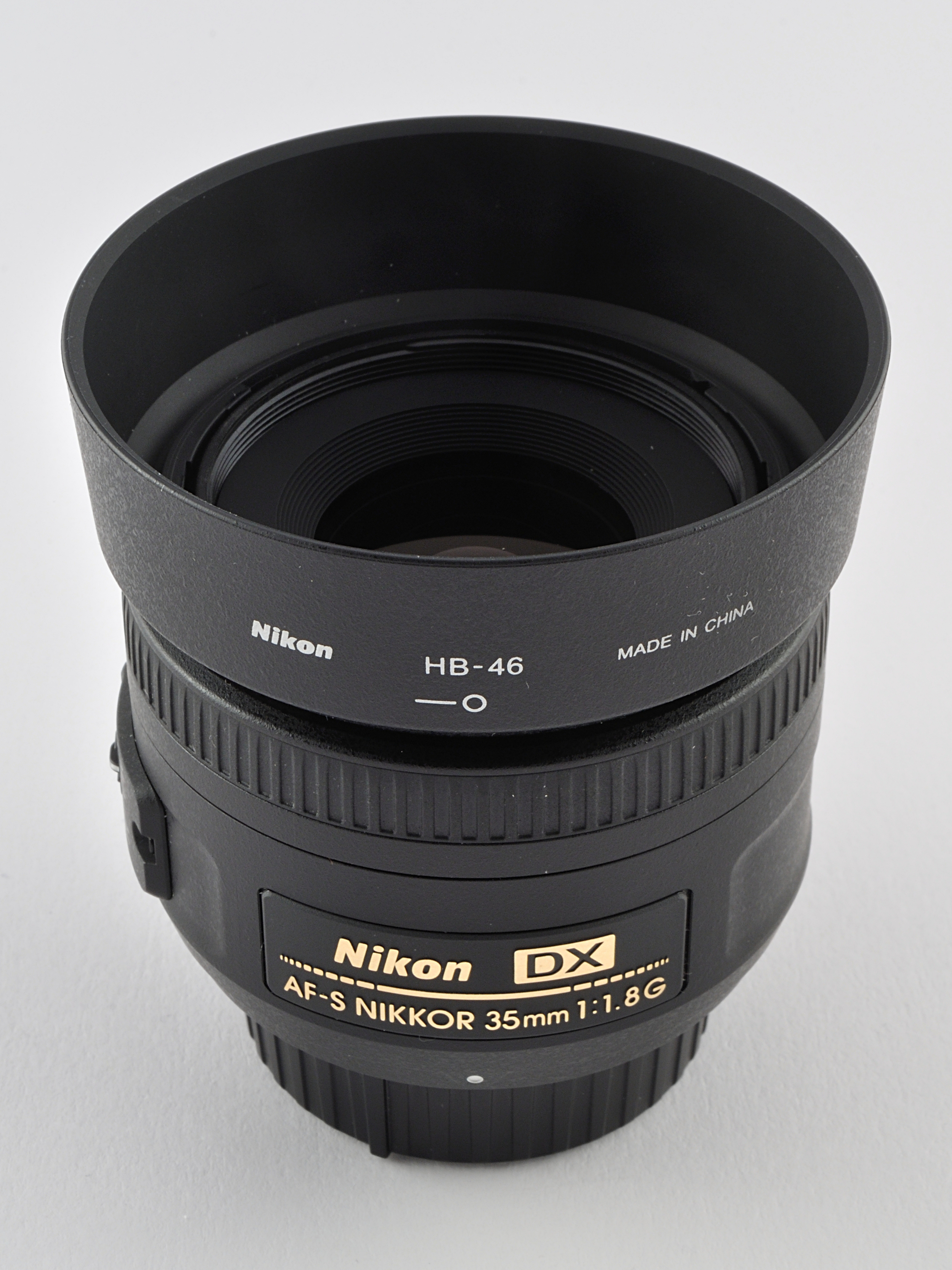
With hood HB-46 attached

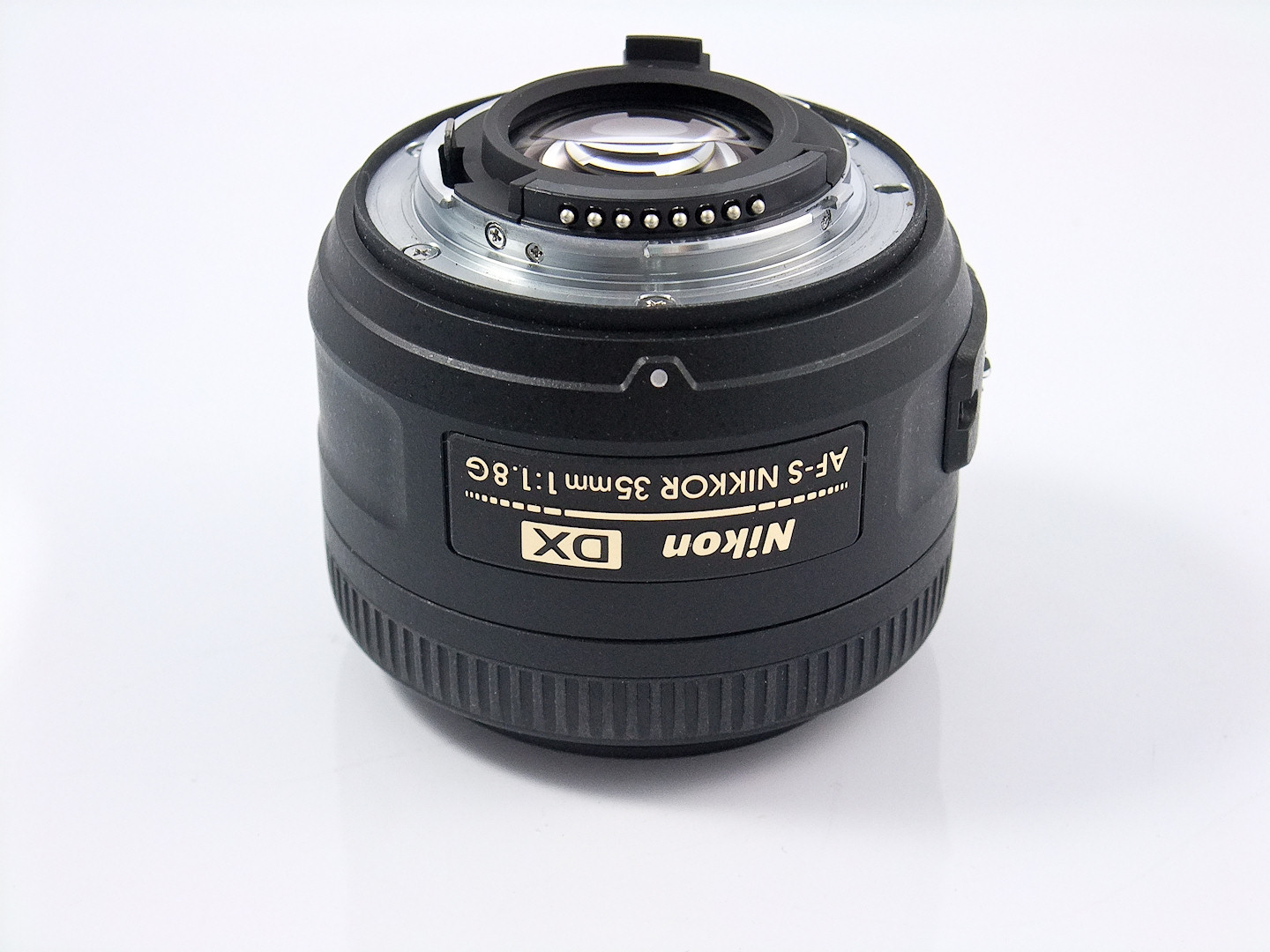
Metal mount with contact pins

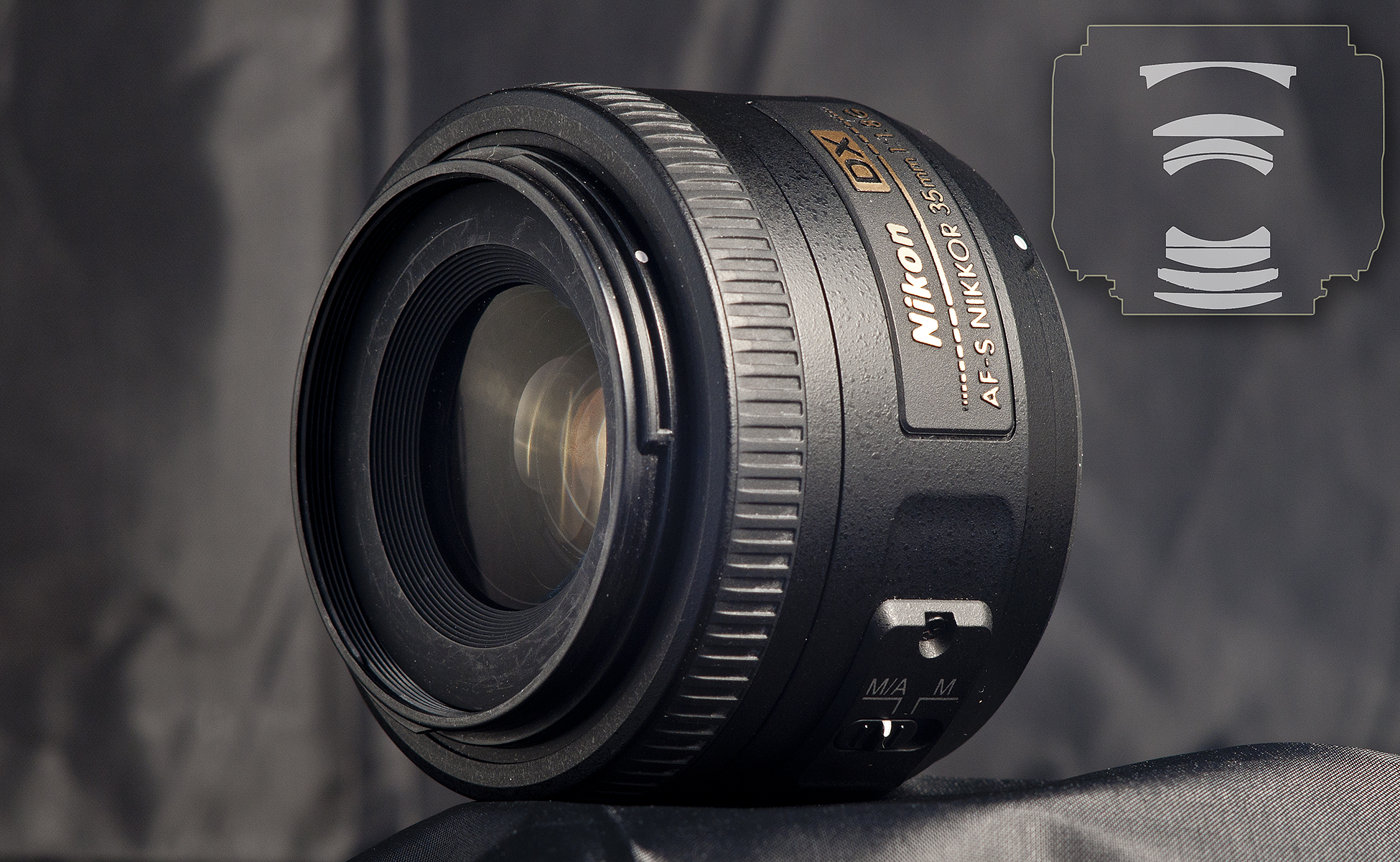

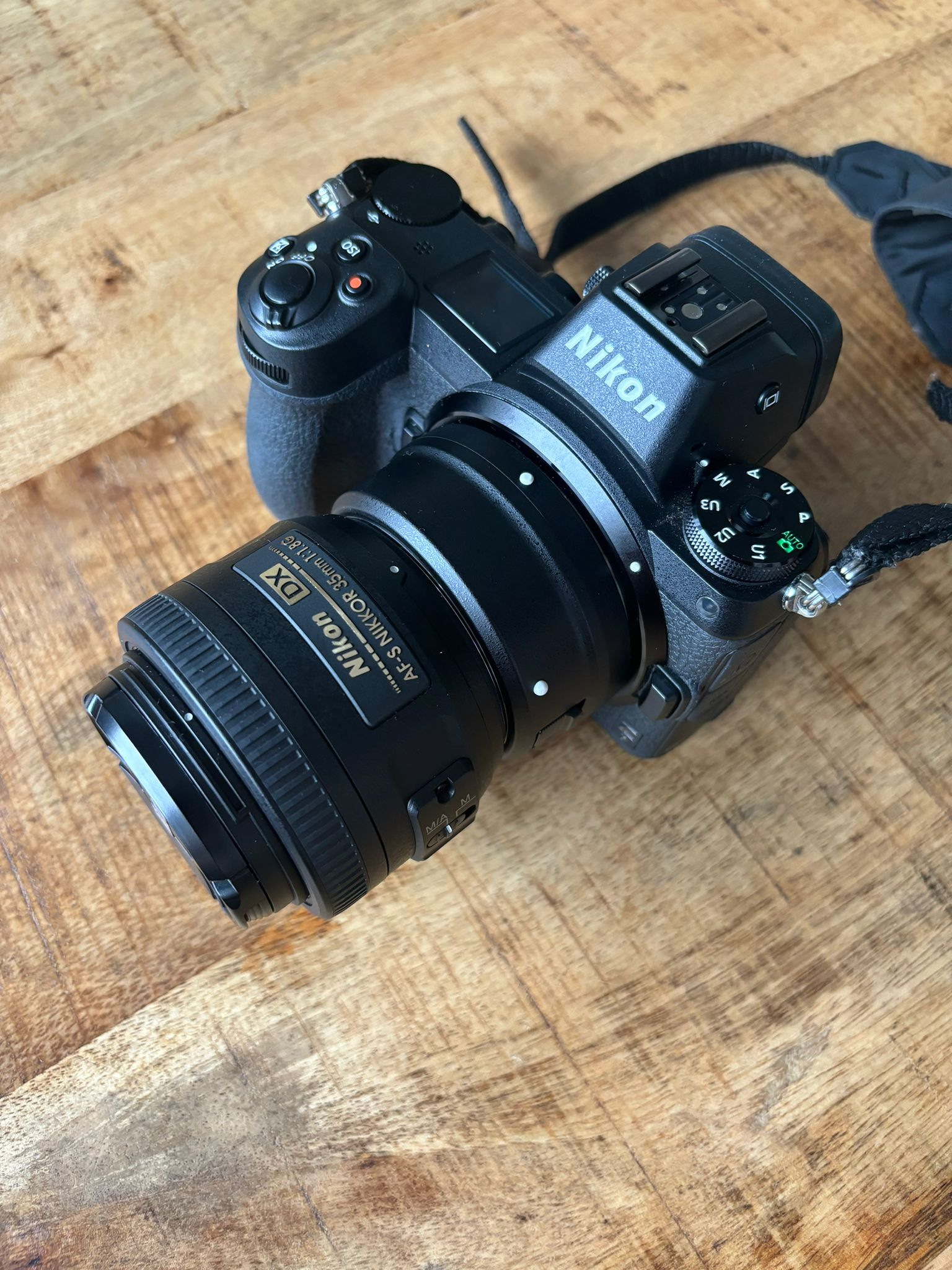
Mounted on a Nikon Z7 using the FTZ mount adapter, with lens cap attached

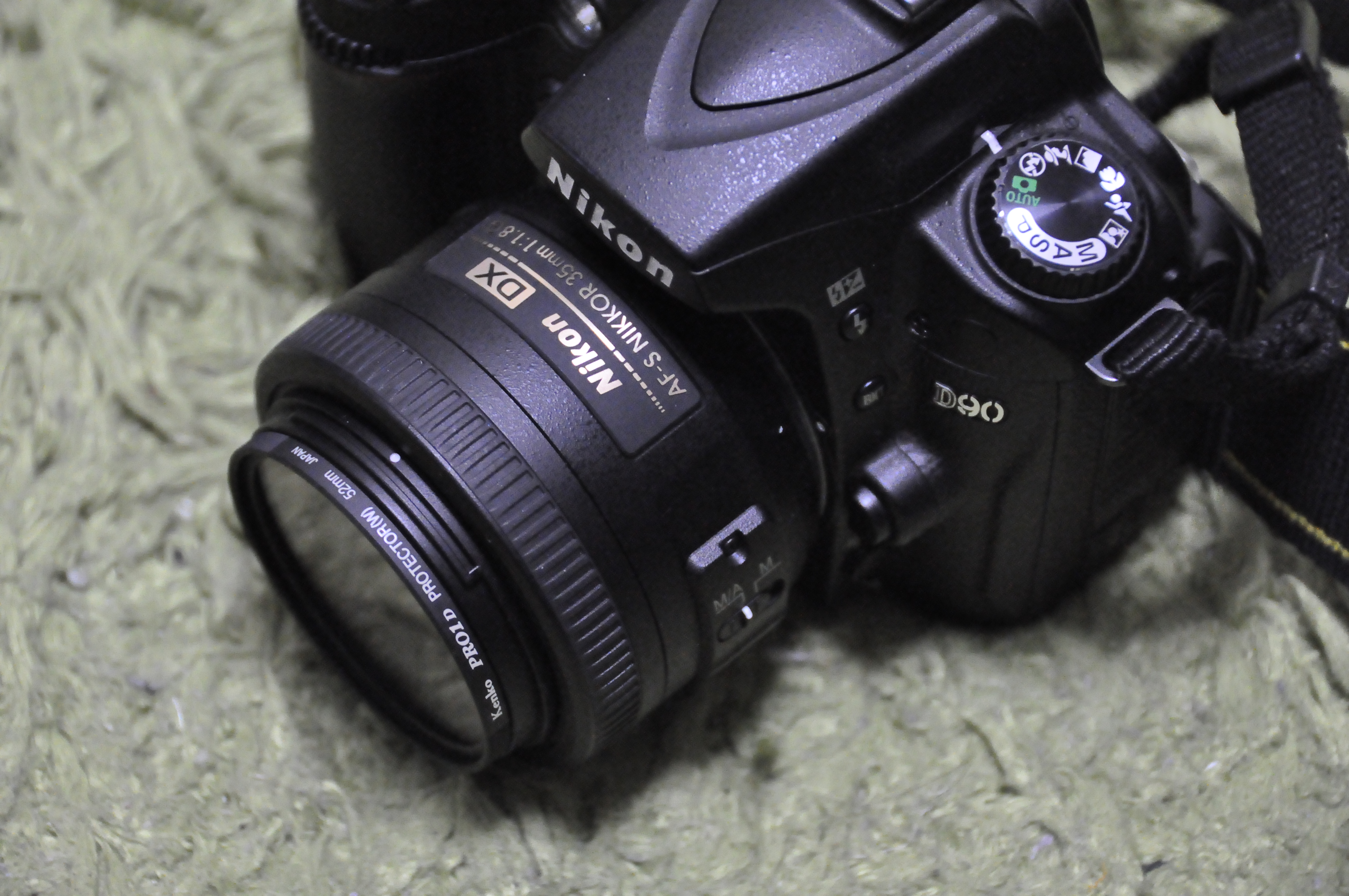
Mounted on a Nikon D90, with a filter attached

== See also ==
- List of Nikon F-mount lenses with integrated autofocus motor
