= Nikon Nikkor Z DX 24 mm f/1.7 =

Nikon lens

Nikkor Z DX 24 mm f/1.7
- Maker: Nikon
- Lens mount: Z-mount

Technical data
- Type: Prime
- Focus drive: Stepping motor
- Focal length: 24mm
- Focal length (35mm equiv.): 36mm
- Image format: DX (APS-C)
- Aperture (max/min): f/1.7–11
- Close focus distance: 0.18m
- Max. magnification: 1:5.3
- Diaphragm blades: 7 (rounded)
- Construction: 9 elements in 8 groups

Features
- Lens-based stabilization: No No
- Macro capable: No No
- Application: Wide-angle lens

Physical
- Max. length: 40 mm
- Diameter: 70 mm
- Weight: 135 g
- Filter diameter: 46 mm

Software
- Lens ID: 43

Accessories
- Lens hood: HN-42 (screw-on)

Angle of view
- Diagonal: 61° (DX)

History
- Introduction: May 2023

Retail info
- MSRP: 279 USD (as of 2023)

The Nikon Nikkor Z DX 24 mm f/1.7 is a DX-format (APS-C) prime lens manufactured by Nikon for use on Nikon Z-mount mirrorless cameras.

== Introduction ==
The lens was announced on May 31, 2023, and released on June 7, 2023.

Compared to the popular 35 mm f/1.8G DX-format prime for F-mount, this lens offers a shorter focal length (by 11 mm), with a slightly brighter aperture (f/1.7 instead of f/1.8). The lens comes with a screw-type lens hood (HN-42). There is a 46 mm filter thread on the lens and also on the lens hood. The lens has a plastic mount and no weather sealing, although according to website SLR Lounge, as with all lenses without officially designated weather sealing, with care it also can take light rain without any issues. Focus breathing is minimal on the lens. Matthew Richards of Digital Camera World praised its versatility and impressive performance at a competitive price.

== Features ==
- 24 mm focal length (approximately equivalent field of view of a 36 mm lens on a full-frame format camera)
- Autofocus using a stepping motor (STM), focus-by-wire manual focus ring
- 9 elements in 8 groups (including 2 aspherical lens elements)
- 7-blade rounded diaphragm
- One customizable control ring (manual focusing by default, aperture, ISO and exposure compensation functions can be assigned to it)

== Sample images ==
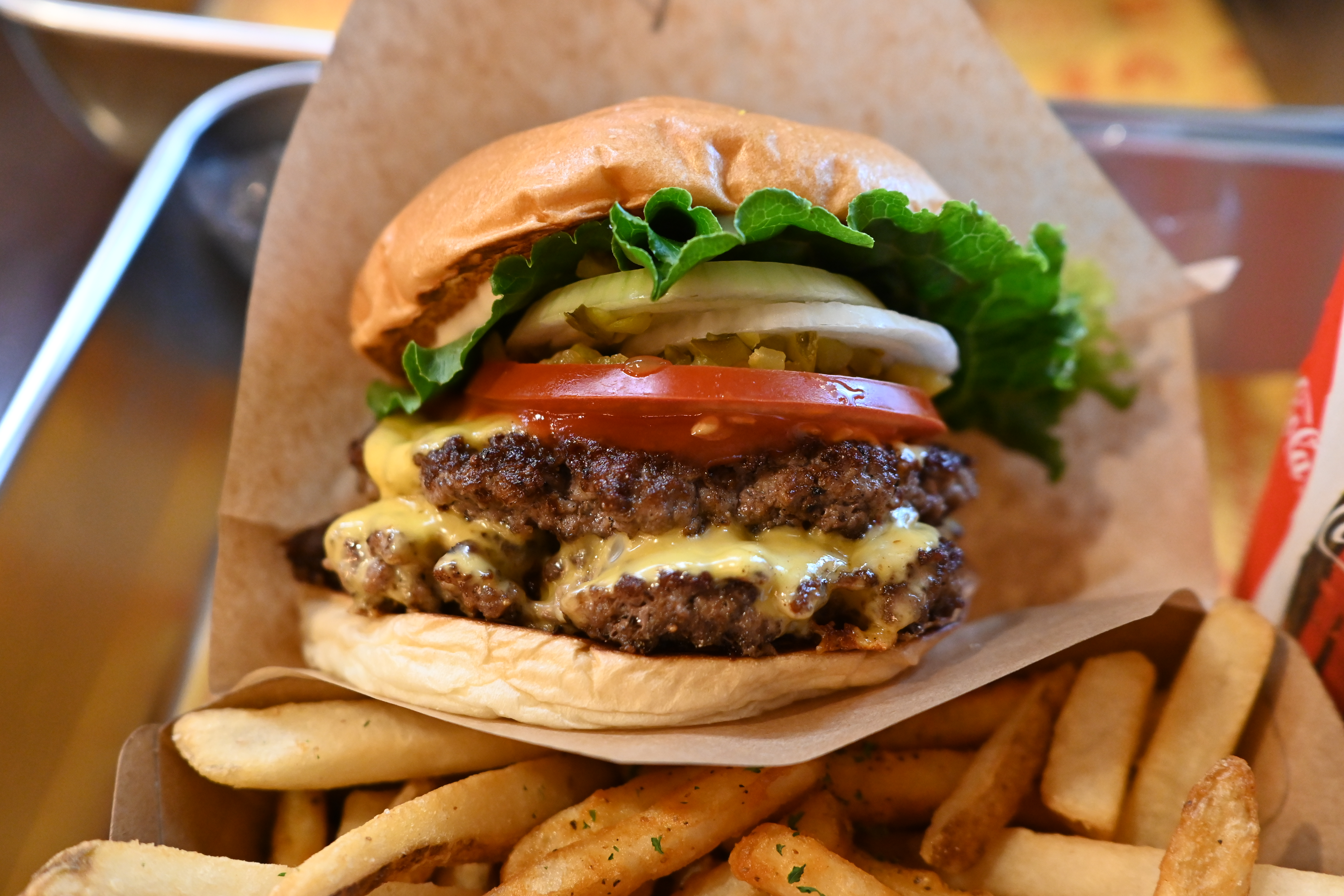
At f/2.8

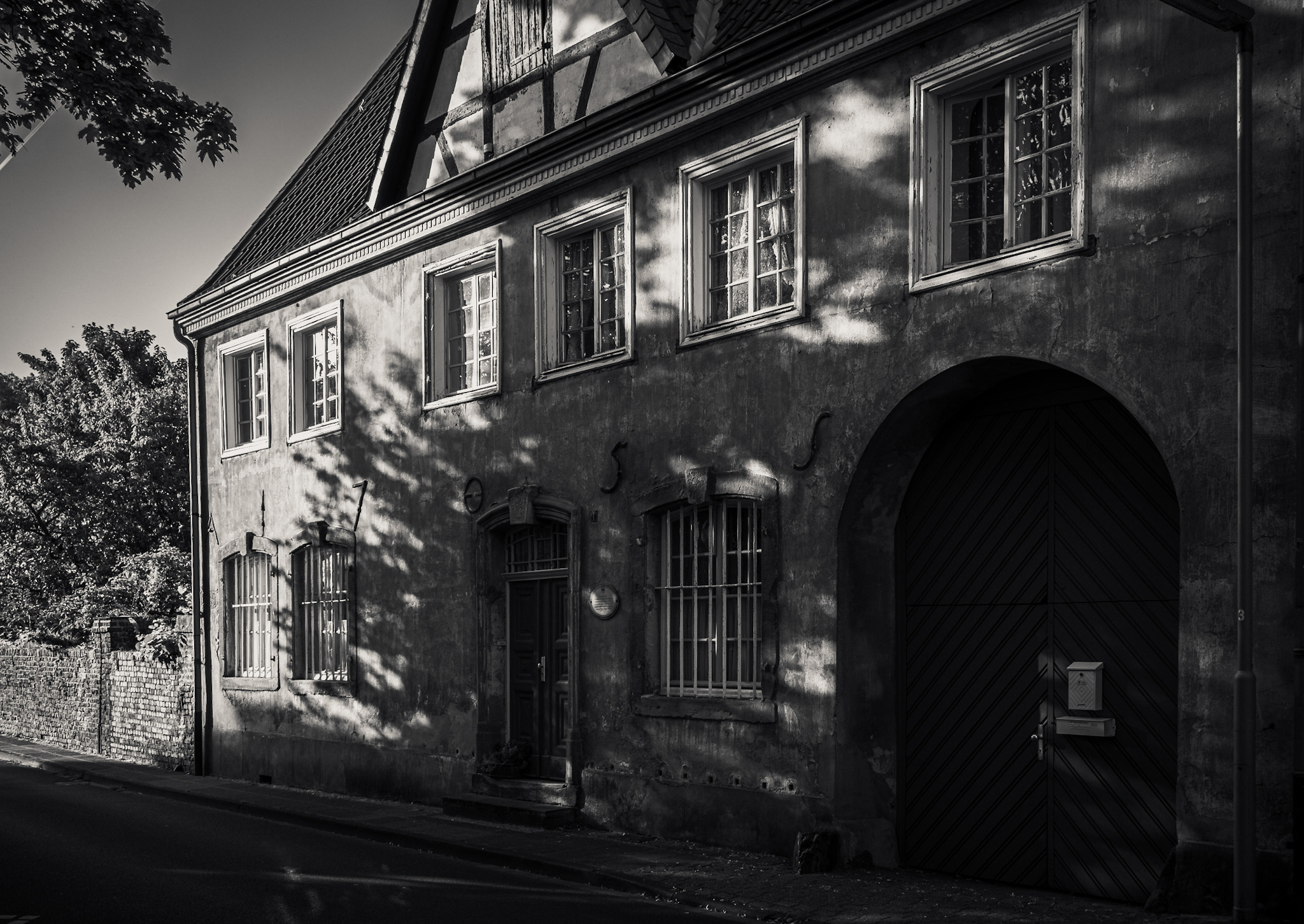
At f/4.5

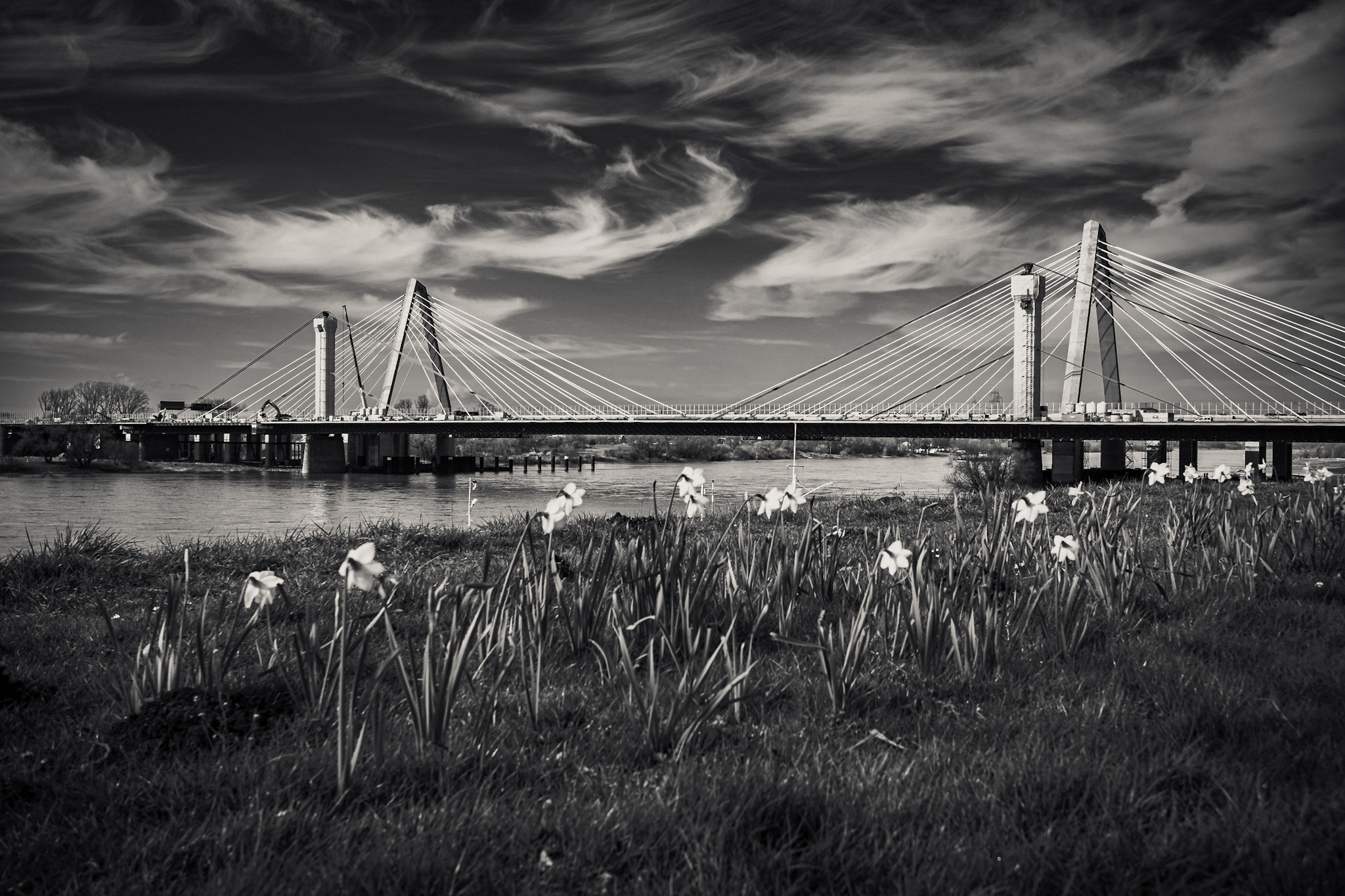
At f/5

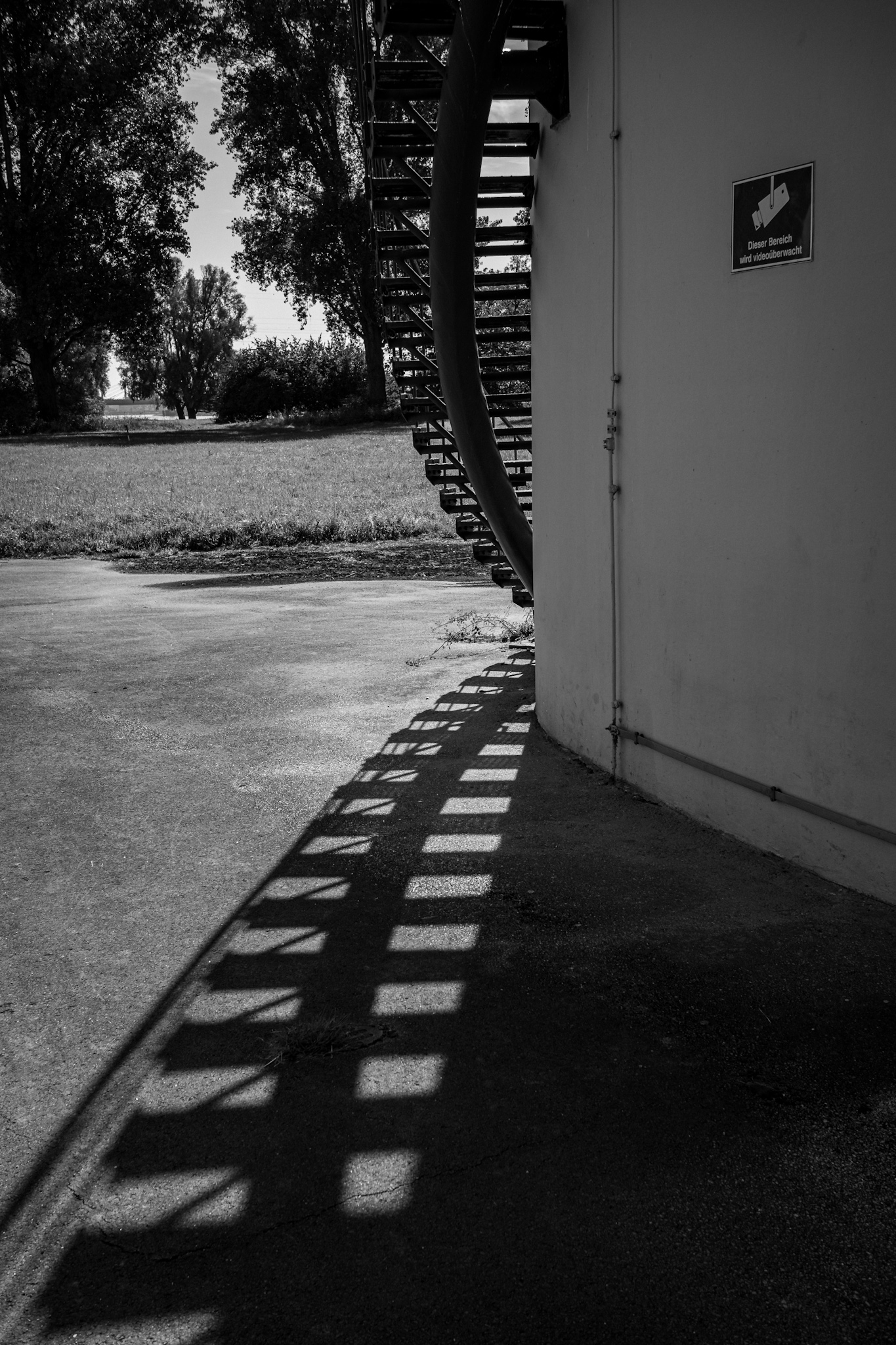
At f/5.6

== See also ==
- Nikon Z-mount
