= Nikon D3500 =

Digital single-lens reflex camera

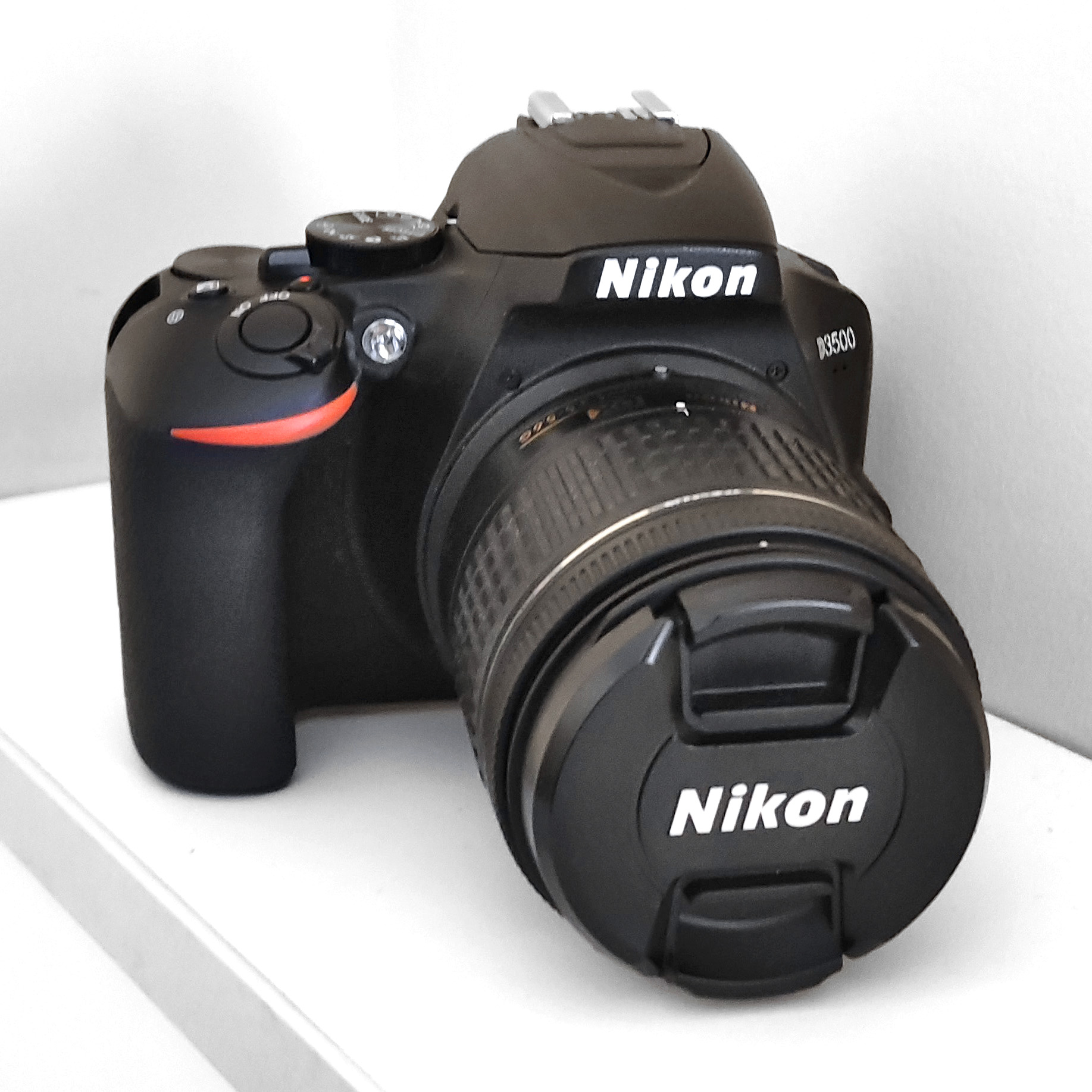

Overview
- Maker: Nikon
- Type: Digital single-lens reflex

Lens
- Lens: Interchangeable Nikon F-mount

Sensor/medium
- Sensor: 23.5 mm x 15.6 mm DX CMOS, 1.5 x FOV crop
- Sensor maker: Sony
- Maximum resolution: 6,000 × 4,000 (24.2 effective megapixels)
- Film speed: 100-25,600
- Recording medium: Secure Digital, SDHC and SDXC compatible

Focusing
- Focus modes: Single-servo AF (AF-S), Continuous-servo AF (AF-C), Auto AF-S/AF-C selection (AF-A), predictive focus tracking based on subject, and Manual focus (MF) with electronic rangefinder
- Focus areas: 11-point AF system with the Multicam 1000 AF sensor module

Exposure/metering
- Exposure modes: Aperture-priority (A), Auto, Auto (flash off), Manual (M), Programmed Auto with flexible Program (P), Shutter-priority (S) and Scene Modes Auto, Auto (flash off), Child, Close-up, Landscape, Night Portrait, Portrait, Sports, and Special Effects Modes Night Vision, Super Vivid, Pop, Photo Illustration, Toy Camera Effect, Miniature Effect, Selective Color, Silhouette, High Key and Low Key
- Exposure metering: TTL exposure metering through a 420-pixel RGB sensor
- Metering modes: 3D Color Matrix Metering II (type E and G lenses only), Center-weighted (75% of the 8mm circle in the center of the frame) and Spot meter (3.5mm circle centered on selected focus point)

Flash
- Flash: Built-in pop-up, Flash Sync Modes: Auto, Auto w/Red Eye Reduction, Auto Slow Sync, Auto Slow Sync w/ Red Eye Reduction, Fill-Flash, Rear-curtain Sync, Rear-curtain w/Slow Sync, Red Eye Reduction, Red Eye Reduction w/Slow Sync and Slow Sync
- Flash bracketing: Adjustable from -3 to +1 EV in 1/3 EV increments in P, S, A, M and Scene Modes

Shutter
- Shutter: Electronically controlled vertical-travel focal-plane shutter
- Shutter speed range: 30 s to 1/4000 s and Bulb, 1/200 s X-sync
- Continuous shooting: 5 frames/s max. (may be slower depending on certain settings)

Viewfinder
- Viewfinder: Eye-level Pentamirror, coverage: 95% horizontal; 95% vertical (approx.), magnification: 0.85x (approx.)

Image processing
- White balance: Auto, Cloudy, Direct Sunlight, Flash, Fluorescent (7 types), Incandescent, Preset Manual and Shade

General
- LCD screen: 3.0-Inch, 921k dot, wide viewing angle TFT-LCD
- Battery: Nikon EN-EL14a rechargeable Li-Ion Battery
- Weight: Approx. 12.9 oz (370 g) body only
- Made in: Thailand

Chronology
- Predecessor: Nikon D3400

The Nikon D3500 is an entry-level 24.2-megapixel DX format DSLR Nikon F-mount camera announced by Nikon on August 30, 2018. As of September 2018, the D3500 was available with two kits: with an 18-55mm f/3.5-5.6G VR lens for $499.95 and a two lens kit (18-55mm f/3.5-5.6G VR and 70-300mm f/4.5-6.3G lenses) for $849.95. It succeeded the Nikon D3400. In 2019, the D3500 won the TIPA Best DSLR Camera award.

Following its decision in early 2021 to "archive" both the D3500 and D5600 in Japan while continuing to sell them elsewhere "for the time being", Nikon announced in June 2022 that production of both models had ceased.

The discontinuation was seen as heralding the end of the "beginner DSLR" and Nikon did not release a direct successor to the D3500.

== Features ==
The D3500 has the following features:

- 24.2-megapixel CMOS image sensor.
- Guide Mode
- Active D-Lighting.
- Full HD and HD video recording (up to 60 frames/s).
- Up to 5 frames per second continuous shooting.
- ISO sensitivity 100 to 25,600.
- 11-point 3D Tracking Multi-CAM 1000 autofocus sensor module.
- 3D Color Matrix Metering II (only compatible with type-G and E lenses).
- Bluetooth connectivity, but Wi-Fi not equipped.
- Compatible with Nikon's SnapBridge app.
- The internal clock is not always 100% accurate and may drift over time, requiring occasional resetting. When traveling, you may need to update the time zone to ensure accurate timestamps. The Nikon D3500 has an internal clock that must be set manually unless SnapBridge is used to sync it.If the internal clock is not set, the camera displays a flashing “CLOCK” indicator. This information can be cited from David Busch’s Nikon D3500 Guide to Digital SLR Photography (1st edition). Rocky Nook.

== Predecessor comparison ==
The Nikon D3500 is the successor to the Nikon D3400 that was introduced on August 17, 2016, with the following improvements.

- 45 g lighter body (415 g VS 460 g).
- Longer battery life (1500 Shots VS 1200 Shots).
- Improved deeper grip.
- New button layout.

Sensor	Class	1999	2000	2001	2002	2003	2004	2005	2006	2007	2008	2009	2010	2011	2012	2013	2014	2015	2016	2017	2018	2019	2020	2021	2022	2023	2024	2025	2026
FX (Full-frame)	Flagship											D3X ^{−P}																	
FX (Full-frame)	Flagship										D3 ^{−P}		D3S ^{−P}		D4		D4S		D5^{T}					D6^{T}					
FX (Full-frame)	Professional											D700 ^{−P}			D800/D800E			D810/D810A			D850 ^{AT}								
FX (Full-frame)	Enthusiast																Df												
FX (Full-frame)	Enthusiast																	D750 ^{A}					D780 ^{AT}						
FX (Full-frame)	Enthusiast															D600	D610												
DX (APS-C)	Flagship		D1^{−E}	D1X^{−E}				D2X^{−E}		D2Xs^{−E}																			
DX (APS-C)	Flagship		D1^{−E}	D1H ^{−E}			D2H^{−E}	D2Hs^{−E}																					
DX (APS-C)	Professional				D100^{−E}				D200^{−E}		D300^{−P}		D300S^{−P}						D500 ^{AT}										
DX (APS-C)	Enthusiast						D70^{−E}		D70s^{−E}	D80^{−E}		D90^{−E}		D7000 ^{−P}			D7100	D7200			D7500 ^{AT}								
DX (APS-C)	Upper-entry								D50^{−E}	D40X^{−E*}	D60^{−E*}		D5000^{A−P*}		D5100^{A−P*}	D5200^{A−P*}	D5300^{A*}	D5500^{AT*}		D5600 ^{AT*}									
DX (APS-C)	Entry-level									D40^{−E*}			D3000^{−E*}	D3100^{−P*}		D3200^{−P*}	D3300^{*}			D3400^{*}		D3500^{*}							
Early models		SVC (prototype; 1986); QV-1000C (1988); NASA F4 (1991); E2/E2S (1995); E2N/E2NS (1996); E3/E3S (1998)																											
Sensor	Class																												
Sensor	Class	1999	2000	2001	2002	2003	2004	2005	2006	2007	2008	2009	2010	2011	2012	2013	2014	2015	2016	2017	2018	2019	2020	2021	2022	2023	2024	2025	2026
