= Nikon D3300 =

2014 APS-C digital single-lens reflex camera

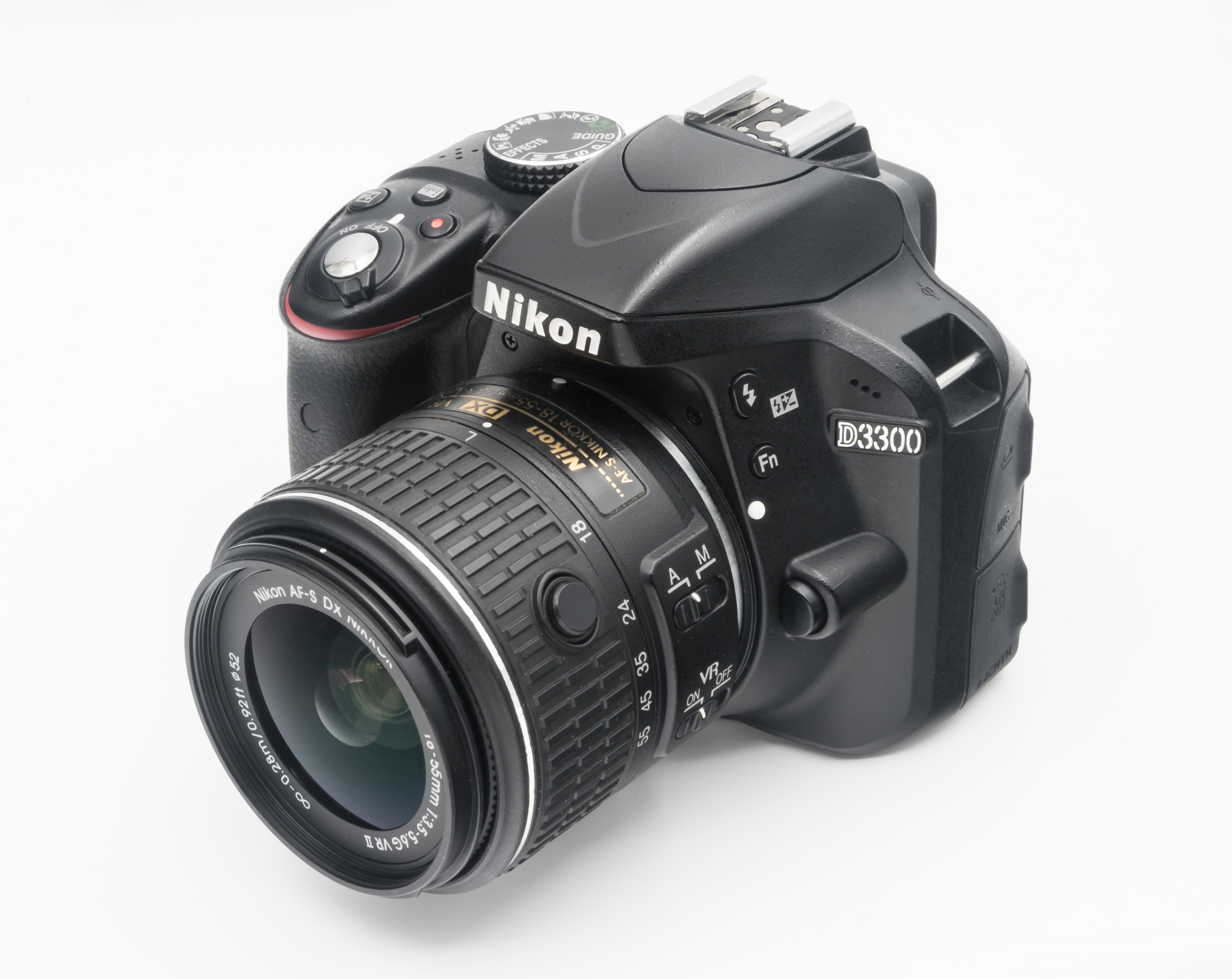

Overview
- Maker: Nikon
- Type: Digital single-lens reflex

Lens
- Lens: Interchangeable, Nikon F-mount

Sensor/medium
- Sensor: 23.5 mm × 15.6 mm Nikon DX format CMOS sensor
- Maximum resolution: 6016 × 4000 pixels (24.2 megapixels)
- Film speed: 100–12800 in 1/3 EV steps, up to 25600 as Hi 1
- Storage media: Secure Digital, SDHC and SDXC compatible, UHS-I bus

Focusing
- Focus areas: 11-area AF system

Exposure/metering
- Exposure metering: TTL 3D Color Matrix Metering II metering with a 420-pixel RGB sensor

Flash
- Flash: Built in Pop-up

Shutter
- Shutter speed range: 30 s to 1/4000 s in 1/2 or 1/3 stops and Bulb, 1/200 s X-sync
- Continuous shooting: 5 frames

Viewfinder
- Viewfinder: Optical 0.85×, 95% Pentamirror

Image processing
- White balance: Auto, incandescent, fluorescent (7 types), direct sunlight, flash, cloudy, shade, preset manual, all except preset manual with fine-tuning

General
- Battery: Nikon EN-EL14a, EN-EL14 rechargeable Lithium-Ion battery
- Weight: 410 g (14 oz) (0.90 lb) without battery, memory card or body cap
- Latest firmware: 1.02 / 8 August 2017; 8 years ago
- Made in: Thailand

Chronology
- Predecessor: Nikon D3200
- Successor: Nikon D3400

The Nikon D3300 is a 24.2-megapixel Nikon DX-format F-mount DSLR camera officially launched on 7 January 2014. It was marketed as an entry-level DSLR camera for beginners (offering tutorial- and improved guide-mode) and experienced DSLR hobbyists who were ready for more advanced specs and performance. It replaced the D3200 as Nikon's entry level DSLR. The D3300 usually came with an 18-55mm VR II kit lens, which is the upgraded model of the older VR (Vibration Reduction) lens. The new kit lens has the ability to retract its barrel, shortening it for easy storage.

The Expeed 4 image-processing engine enables the camera to capture 60 fps 1080p video in MPEG-4 format. And 24.2-megapixel images without optical low-pass filter (OLPF, anti-aliasing (AA) filter) at 5 fps as the fastest for low-entry DSLR. It was Nikon's first DSLR camera with Easy (sweep) Panorama. As in the Nikon D5300, the carbon-fiber-reinforced polymer body and also the new retractable kit lens made it smaller and lighter. The camera body is approx. 124 mm × 98 mm × 75.5 mm and weighs 460 g with and 410 g without battery and memory card.

In April 2014, the D3300 received a Technical Image Press Association (TIPA) award in the category "Best Digital SLR Entry Level".

The D3300 was superseded as Nikon's entry-level camera by the D3400 in late 2016.

== New features ==
- 24.2-megapixel image sensor with 12-bit color depth. Optical low-pass filter removed (OLPF, anti-aliasing (AA) filter) at 5 Frames per second
- Expeed 4 with 1080p video in 60p/50p fps
- New viewfinder with 0.85 magnification
- Panorama mode (Nikon's first DSLR)
- 13 special effects
- New auto flash modes
- Tutorial mode and new, improved guide mode
- Carbon-fiber-reinforced polymer, smaller and lighter body
- EN-EL14a and EN-EL14 batteries with enhanced battery life of 700 shots, also due to the new Expeed 4 processor
- Wi-Fi is an optional extra via the WU-1a adapter, which slides into the left side of the camera
- 3.5 mm mic port
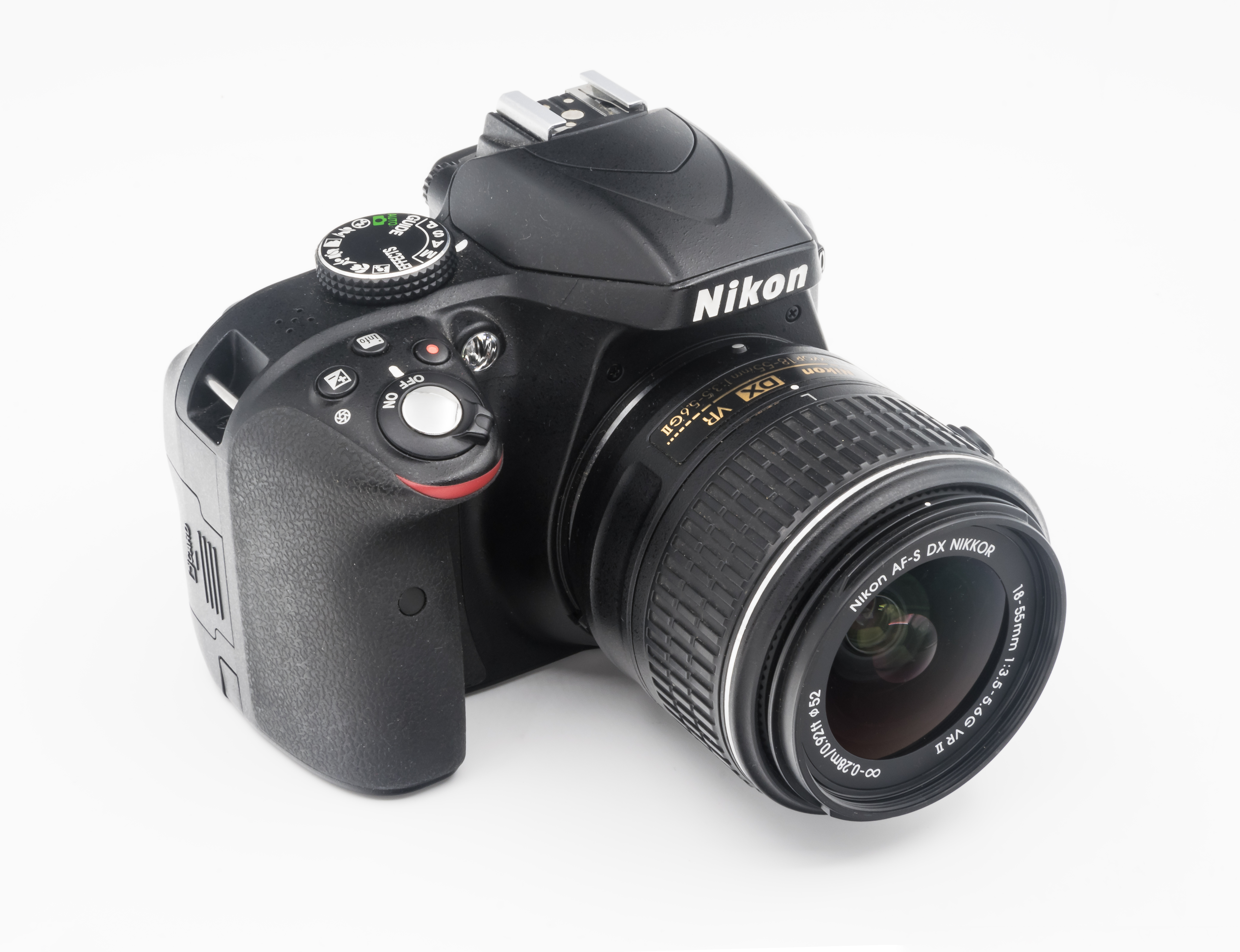
D3300 + Nikkor AF-S DX 18-55mm f/3.5-5.6G VR II

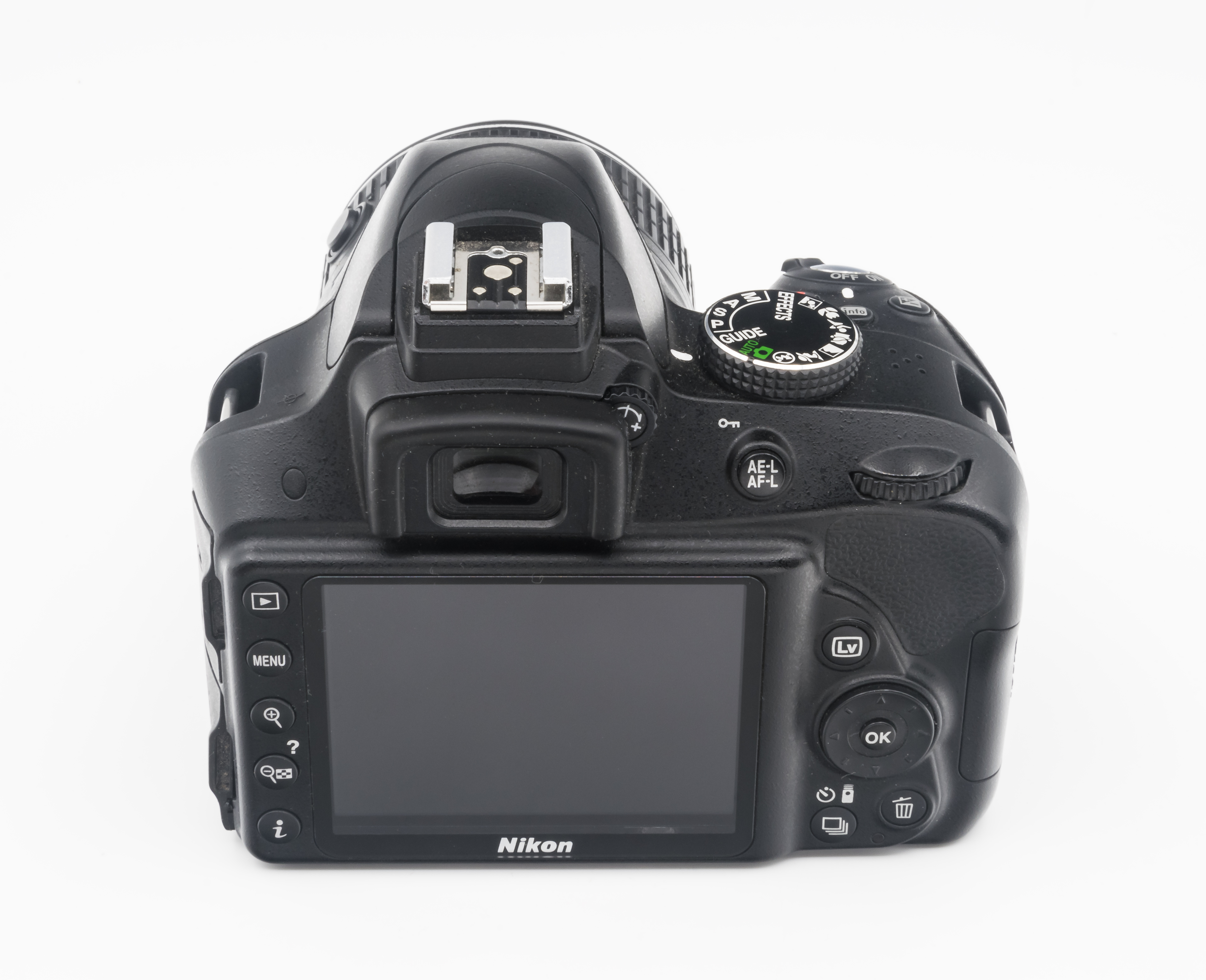
Rear side screen and controls

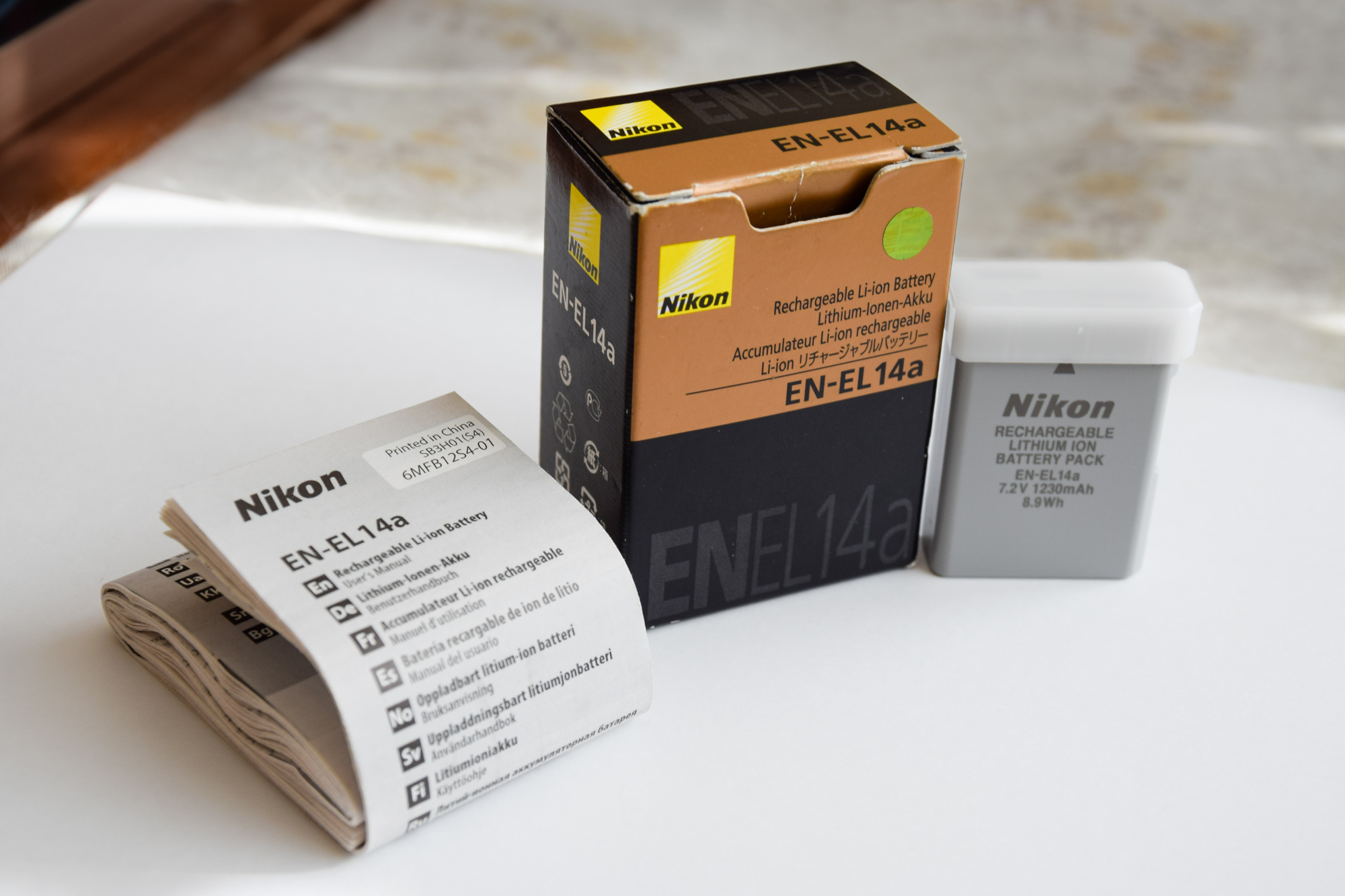
EN-EL14a battery for D3300

== See also ==
- List of Nikon F-mount lenses with integrated autofocus motor – the D3300 lacks an autofocus motor, but includes an electronic rangefinder. Therefore, the D3300 can only autofocus with lenses with integrated autofocus motors (currently 162).

| Sensor | Class | '99 | '00 | '01 | '02 | '03 | '04 | '05 | '06 | '07 | '08 | '09 | '10 | '11 | '12 | '13 | '14 | '15 | '16 | '17 | '18 | '19 | '20 | '21 | '22 | '23 | '24 | '25 | '26 |
|---|---|---|---|---|---|---|---|---|---|---|---|---|---|---|---|---|---|---|---|---|---|---|---|---|---|---|---|---|---|
| FX (Full-frame) | Flagship | | | | | | | | | | | D3X ^{−P} | | | | | | | | | | | | | | | | | |
| FX (Full-frame) | Flagship | | | | | | | | | | D3 ^{−P} | | D3S ^{−P} | | D4 | | D4S | | D5^{T} | | | | | D6^{T} | | | | | |
| FX (Full-frame) | Professional | | | | | | | | | | | D700 ^{−P} | | | D800/D800E | | | D810/D810A | | | D850 ^{AT} | | | | | | | | |
| FX (Full-frame) | Enthusiast | | | | | | | | | | | | | | | | Df | | | | | | | | | | | | |
| FX (Full-frame) | Enthusiast | | | | | | | | | | | | | | | | | D750 ^{A} | | | | | D780 ^{AT} | | | | | | |
| FX (Full-frame) | Enthusiast | | | | | | | | | | | | | | | D600 | D610 | | | | | | | | | | | | |
| DX (APS-C) | Flagship | | D1^{−E} | D1X^{−E} | | | | D2X^{−E} | | D2Xs^{−E} | | | | | | | | | | | | | | | | | | | |
| DX (APS-C) | Flagship | | D1^{−E} | D1H ^{−E} | | | D2H^{−E} | D2Hs^{−E} | | | | | | | | | | | | | | | | | | | | | |
| DX (APS-C) | Professional | | | | D100^{−E} | | | | D200^{−E} | | D300^{−P} | | D300S^{−P} | | | | | | D500 ^{AT} | | | | | | | | | | |
| DX (APS-C) | Enthusiast | | | | | | D70^{−E} | | D70s^{−E} | D80^{−E} | | D90^{−E} | | D7000 ^{−P} | | | D7100 | D7200 | | | D7500 ^{AT} | | | | | | | | |
| DX (APS-C) | Upper-entry | | | | | | | | D50^{−E} | D40X^{−E*} | D60^{−E*} | | D5000^{A−P*} | | D5100^{A−P*} | D5200^{A−P*} | D5300^{A*} | D5500^{AT*} | | D5600 ^{AT*} | | | | | | | | | |
| DX (APS-C) | Entry-level | | | | | | | | | D40^{−E*} | | | D3000^{−E*} | D3100^{−P*} | | D3200^{−P*} | D3300^{*} | | | D3400^{*} | | D3500^{*} | | | | | | | |
| Early models | | SVC (prototype; 1986); QV-1000C (1988); NASA F4 (1991); E2/E2S (1995); E2N/E2NS (1996); E3/E3S (1998) | | | | | | | | | | | | | | | | | | | | | | | | | | | |
| Sensor | Class | | | | | | | | | | | | | | | | | | | | | | | | | | | | |
| Sensor | Class | '99 | '00 | '01 | '02 | '03 | '04 | '05 | '06 | '07 | '08 | '09 | '10 | '11 | '12 | '13 | '14 | '15 | '16 | '17 | '18 | '19 | '20 | '21 | '22 | '23 | '24 | '25 | '26 |
