= Nikon D3200 =

Camera model

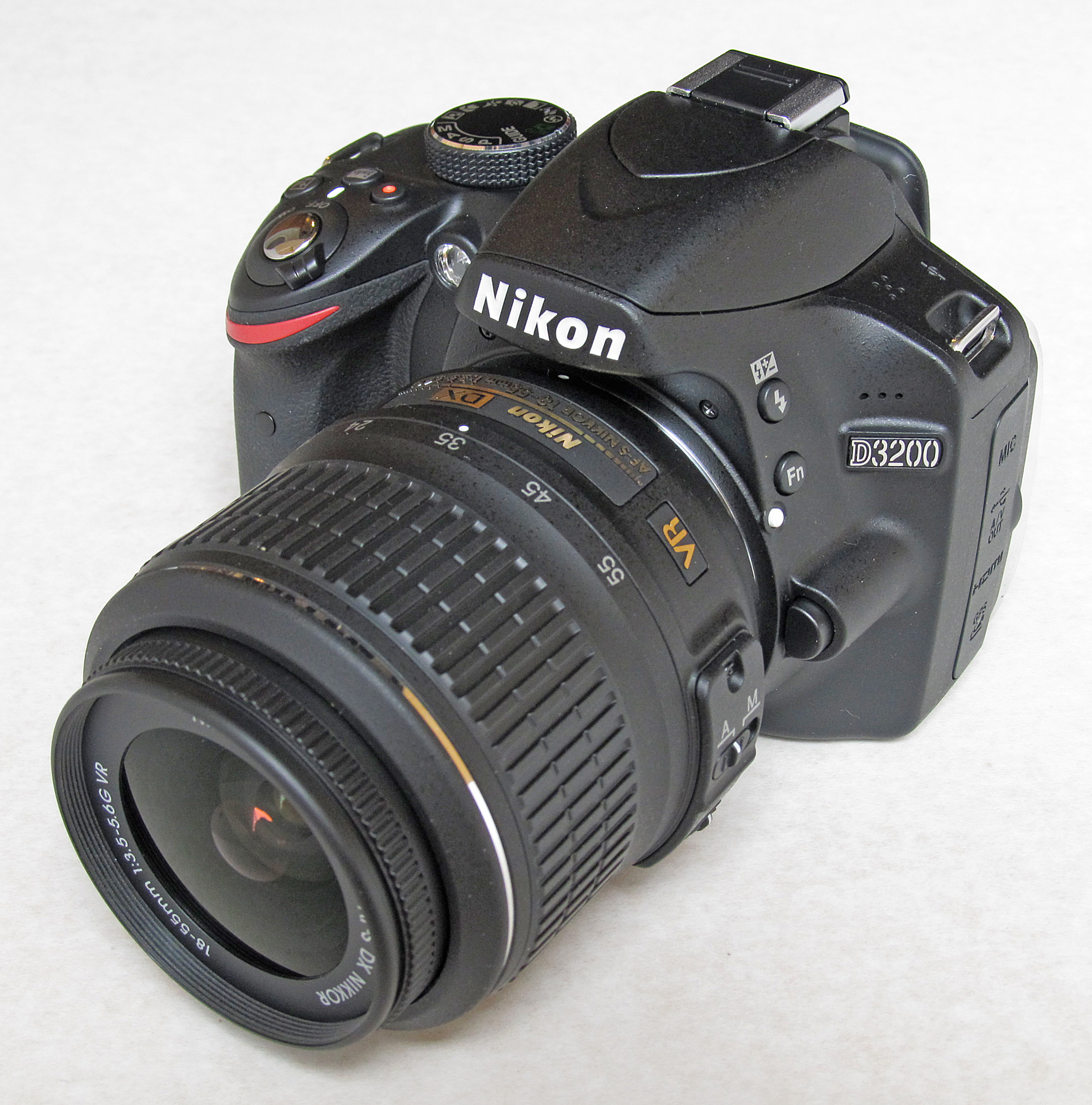

Overview
- Maker: Nikon
- Type: Digital single-lens reflex

Lens
- Lens: Interchangeable, Nikon F-mount

Sensor/medium
- Sensor: 23.2 mm × 15.4 mm Nikon DX format RGB CMOS sensor, 1.5 × FOV crop, 3.85 µm pixel size
- Sensor maker: Nikon
- Maximum resolution: 6,016 × 4,000 (24.2 effective megapixels)
- Film speed: 100–6400 in 1 EV steps, up to 12800 as boost
- Storage media: Secure Digital, SDHC and SDXC compatible, UHS-I bus

Focusing
- Focus modes: Instant single-servo (AF-S); full time-servo (AF-F); auto AF-S/AF-F selection (AF-A); manual (M)
- Focus areas: 11-area AF system, Multi-CAM 1000 AF Sensor Module

Exposure/metering
- Exposure modes: Auto modes (auto, auto [flash off]), Guide Mode, Advanced Scene Modes (Portrait, Landscape, Sports, Close-up, Night Portrait), programmed auto with flexible program (P), shutter-priority auto (S), aperture-priority auto (A), manual (M), (Q) quiet mode.
- Exposure metering: TTL 3D Color Matrix Metering II metering with a 420-pixel RGB sensor
- Metering modes: 3D Color Matrix Metering II, Center-weighted and Spot

Flash
- Flash: Built in Pop-up, Guide number 13 m at ISO 100, Standard ISO hotshoe, Compatible with the Nikon Creative Lighting System
- Flash bracketing: 2 or 3 frames in steps of 1/3, 1/2, 2/3, 1 or 2 EV

Shutter
- Shutter: Electronically-controlled vertical-travel focal-plane shutter
- Shutter speed range: 30 s to 1/4000 s in 1/2 or 1/3 stops and Bulb, 1/200 s X-sync
- Continuous shooting: 4 fps

Viewfinder
- Viewfinder: Optical 0.80x, 95% Pentamirror

Image processing
- White balance: Auto, Incandescent, Fluorescent, Sunlight, Flash, Cloudy, Shade, Kelvin temperature, Preset

General
- LCD screen: 3.0-inch TFT-LCD, 640 × 480 pixel (307,200 pixels), 267 ppi
- Battery: Nikon EN-EL14 rechargeable Lithium-Ion battery
- Weight: Approx. 455 g (1.003 lb) without battery, memory card or body cap
- Latest firmware: 1.04 / 2 June 2015; 10 years ago
- Made in: Thailand

Chronology
- Predecessor: Nikon D3100
- Successor: Nikon D3300

The Nikon D3200 is a 24.2-megapixel DX format DSLR Nikon F-mount camera officially launched by Nikon on April 19, 2012. It is marketed as an entry-level DSLR camera for beginners and experienced DSLR hobbyists who are ready for more advanced specs and performance.

The guide mode, with integrated tutorials, is especially useful for beginners. The D3200 replaces the D3100 as Nikon's entry level DSLR, but its improved image quality has been compared to that of pro DSLRs. Based on DxOMark, the Nikon D3200 entry-level crop DSLR surpassed the DxOMark Overall Sensor Score of the fullframe Canon EOS 5D Mark II, although 5D Mark II was state-of-the-art when it was launched four years before.

Its successor is the Nikon D3300 announced in January 2014 with new Nikon Expeed 4 image processor, without optical low pass filter (OLPF), 5 fps and the Nikon's first DSLR camera with Easy (sweep) Panorama. As in the Nikon D5300, the carbon-fiber-reinforced polymer body and also the new retractable kit lens makes it smaller and lighter.

== Features ==
- 24.2 (total 24.7) megapixel DX-format CMOS sensor with 12 bit resolution, made by Nikon
- 1080p Full HD movie mode
- Nikon Expeed 3 image/video processor
- Active D-Lighting
- Automatic chromatic aberration correction
- Image Sensor Cleaning function by vibrations and Airflow Control System
- Image area Pixels is the DX Format which can be adjusted to (Large) 6,016 × 4,000 (Medium) 4,512 × 3,000 (Small) 3,008 × 2,000
- Storage media is either SD, SDHC or SDXC, UHS-I bus mode, and Eye-Fi Wireless LAN
- GPS interface for direct geotagging supported by Nikon GP-1

=== Wide dynamic range versus automatic exposure bracketing ===
The dynamic range of the Nikon D3200 (Expeed 3 named Expeed 2 type, 14 bits reduced to 12 bits) exceeds even full-frame DSLRs like Nikon D3S (Expeed 2 named Expeed (1) type, 14 bits) or Canon 5D MK3 (DIGIC 5+, 14 bits) at low film speeds (ISO 100 and ISO 200) due to reduced effective resolution of the analog-to-digital converters.

The D3200 does not have automatic exposure bracketing. The very high dynamic range of the Nikon D3200 makes it possible to shoot high dynamic range images (HDR, mostly created by combining multiple images with different exposures) with one shot, especially when using raw image format. The one-shot HDR method also avoids disadvantages like blurring, ghost images or other errors when merging multiple images.

== Reception ==
DxO Labs awarded its sensor an overall score of 81, partly due to a very wide dynamic range. At time of testing the second-highest result of all APS-C DSLRs in the DxO Labs/DxOMark sensor rating was achieved, above that of much more expensive competitors. Digital Photography Review awarded the camera a score of 73% earning it a "silver award", praising the versatility and value while also noting its "slow AF" and lack of in-camera filter effects. TechRadar gave it a score of 4/5, citing the camera's guide mode and sensor as its strong points and its "odd colours" on the LCD screen as its weakest. T3 magazine called the D3200 "one of the best beginner DSLRs around", stating that while "slightly pricey" and with some LCD screen problems, the guide mode and "excellent picture quality" make it "great if you're a DSLR beginner looking for a friendly camera".

== See also ==
- List of Nikon F-mount lenses with integrated autofocus motor – autofocusing is only available with one of these currently 162 lenses, as the D3200 lacks an autofocus motor, but includes an electronic rangefinder.

Sensor	Class	'01	'02	'03	'04	'05	'06	'07	'08	'09	'10	'11	'12	'13	'14	'15	'16	'17	'18	'19	'20	'21	'22	'23	'24	'25	'26
FX (Full-frame)	Flagship									D3X ^{−P}																	
FX (Full-frame)	Flagship								D3 ^{−P}		D3S ^{−P}		D4		D4S		D5^{T}					D6^{T}					
FX (Full-frame)	Professional									D700 ^{−P}			D800/D800E			D810/D810A			D850 ^{AT}								
FX (Full-frame)	Enthusiast														Df												
FX (Full-frame)	Enthusiast															D750 ^{A}					D780 ^{AT}						
FX (Full-frame)	Enthusiast													D600	D610												
DX (APS-C)	Flagship	D1X^{−E}				D2X^{−E}		D2Xs^{−E}																			
DX (APS-C)	Flagship	D1H ^{−E}			D2H^{−E}	D2Hs^{−E}																					
DX (APS-C)	Professional		D100^{−E}				D200^{−E}		D300^{−P}		D300S^{−P}						D500 ^{AT}										
DX (APS-C)	Enthusiast				D70^{−E}		D70s^{−E}	D80^{−E}		D90^{−E}		D7000 ^{−P}			D7100	D7200			D7500 ^{AT}								
DX (APS-C)	Upper-entry						D50^{−E}	D40X^{−E*}	D60^{−E*}		D5000^{A−P*}		D5100^{A−P*}	D5200^{A−P*}	D5300^{A*}	D5500^{AT*}		D5600 ^{AT*}									
DX (APS-C)	Entry-level							D40^{−E*}			D3000^{−E*}	D3100^{−P*}		D3200^{−P*}	D3300^{*}			D3400^{*}		D3500^{*}							
Early models		Nikon SVC (prototype; 1986); Nikon QV-1000C (1988); Nikon NASA F4 (1991); Nikon E2/E2S (1995); Nikon E2N/E2NS (1996); Nikon E3/E3S (1998); D1 (1999)																									
Sensor	Class																										
Sensor	Class	'01	'02	'03	'04	'05	'06	'07	'08	'09	'10	'11	'12	'13	'14	'15	'16	'17	'18	'19	'20	'21	'22	'23	'24	'25	'26
