= Nikon D3400 =

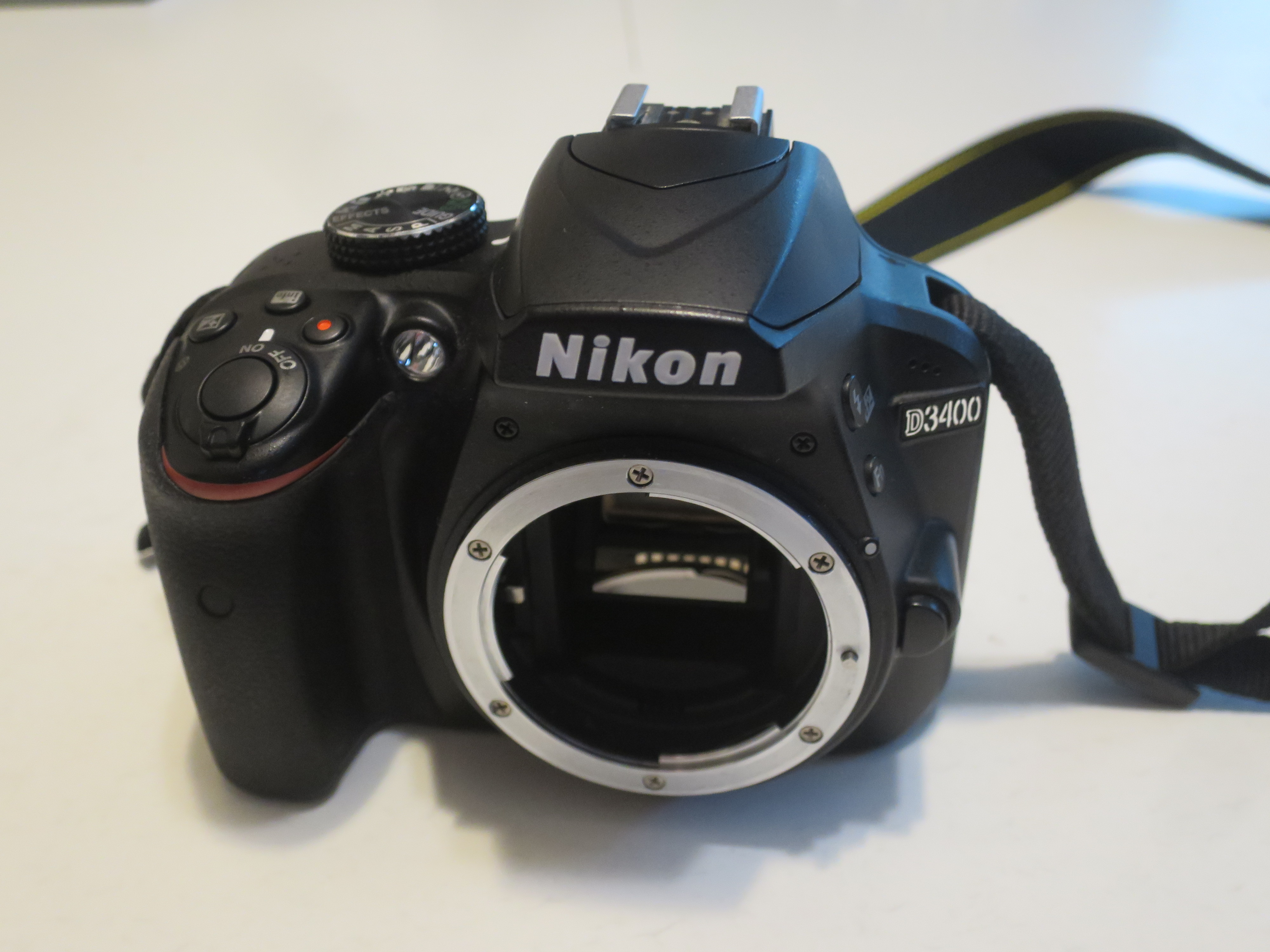

Overview
- Maker: Nikon
- Type: Digital single-lens reflex
- Released: 12 September 2016

Lens
- Lens: Interchangeable, Nikon F-mount

Sensor/medium
- Sensor: 23.5 mm × 15.6 mm Nikon DX format CMOS sensor
- Maximum resolution: 6000 × 4000 pixels (24.2 megapixels)
- Film speed: 100–25,600 in 1/3 EV steps
- Storage media: Secure Digital, SDHC and SDXC compatible, UHS-I bus

Focusing
- Focus modes: Single-servo AF (AF-S), Continuous-servo AF (AF-C), Auto AF-S/AF-C selection (AF-A), predictive focus tracking based on subject, and Manual focus (MF)
- Focus areas: 11-area AF system

Exposure/metering
- Exposure modes: Aperture-priority (A), Auto, Auto (flash off), Manual (M), Programmed Auto with flexible Program (P), Shutter-priority (S) and Scene Modes Auto, Auto (flash off), Child, Close-up, Landscape, Night Portrait, Portrait, Sports, and Special Effects Modes Night Vision, Super Vivid, Pop, Photo Illustration, Toy Camera Effect, Miniature Effect, Selective Color, Silhouette, High Key and Low Key
- Exposure metering: TTL 3D Color Matrix Metering II metering with a 420-pixel RGB sensor

Flash
- Flash: Built in Pop-up

Shutter
- Shutter: Mechanical
- Shutter speed range: 30 s to 1/4000 s in 1/2 or 1/3 stops and Bulb, 1/200 s X-sync
- Continuous shooting: 5 frame/s

Viewfinder
- Viewfinder: Optical 0.85x, 95% Pentamirror

Image processing
- White balance: Auto, incandescent, fluorescent (7 types), direct sunlight, flash, cloudy, shade, preset manual, all except preset manual with fine-tuning

General
- Battery: Nikon EN-EL14a rechargeable Lithium-Ion battery
- Weight: 395 g (14 oz) (0.871 lb) without battery, memory card or body cap
- Latest firmware: 1.13 / 7 June 2018; 8 years ago
- Made in: Thailand

Chronology
- Predecessor: Nikon D3300
- Successor: Nikon D3500

Footnotes
- Announced 17 August 2016

The Nikon D3400 is a 24.2-megapixel DX format DSLR Nikon F-mount camera officially launched by Nikon on August 17, 2016. It is marketed as an entry-level DSLR camera for beginners and experienced DSLR hobbyists. It replaces the D3300 as Nikon's entry level DSLR.

Nikon offers a body/lens kit combinations that varies from country to country. In most countries the D3400 is available with an AF-P 18-55 mm kit lens that includes Nikon's image stabilization (Vibration Reduction, VR). In the US there is an unusual two lens kit option offered only with the black body. The 18–55 mm lens has VR but the second lens being a 70–300 mm is the non-VR variant for a total of US$999.

The D3400 is available in a black or red body.

The D3400 was superseded as Nikon's entry-level camera by the D3500 in August 2018.

The default sensor resolution is 6000x4000

== Changes from D3300 ==
- Added Nikon Snapbridge support via Bluetooth Low Energy, replaced Wi-Fi (note remote control not supported) (GPS geo-tagging added)
- Increased maximum ISO to 25600
- Weaker flash
- Longer battery life
- Infrared receiver repositioned
- Removed 3.5 mm microphone port
- Removed composite video output
- Removed ultrasonic sensor cleaner
- Removed effects Color Sketch, HDR Painting and Easy Panorama
- Removed intervalometer port MC-DC2
- 1/2 ounce (14 g) lighter

Sensor	Class	1999	2000	2001	2002	2003	2004	2005	2006	2007	2008	2009	2010	2011	2012	2013	2014	2015	2016	2017	2018	2019	2020	2021	2022	2023	2024	2025	2026
FX (Full-frame)	Flagship											D3X ^{−P}																	
FX (Full-frame)	Flagship										D3 ^{−P}		D3S ^{−P}		D4		D4S		D5^{T}					D6^{T}					
FX (Full-frame)	Professional											D700 ^{−P}			D800/D800E			D810/D810A			D850 ^{AT}								
FX (Full-frame)	Enthusiast																Df												
FX (Full-frame)	Enthusiast																	D750 ^{A}					D780 ^{AT}						
FX (Full-frame)	Enthusiast															D600	D610												
DX (APS-C)	Flagship		D1^{−E}	D1X^{−E}				D2X^{−E}		D2Xs^{−E}																			
DX (APS-C)	Flagship		D1^{−E}	D1H ^{−E}			D2H^{−E}	D2Hs^{−E}																					
DX (APS-C)	Professional				D100^{−E}				D200^{−E}		D300^{−P}		D300S^{−P}						D500 ^{AT}										
DX (APS-C)	Enthusiast						D70^{−E}		D70s^{−E}	D80^{−E}		D90^{−E}		D7000 ^{−P}			D7100	D7200			D7500 ^{AT}								
DX (APS-C)	Upper-entry								D50^{−E}	D40X^{−E*}	D60^{−E*}		D5000^{A−P*}		D5100^{A−P*}	D5200^{A−P*}	D5300^{A*}	D5500^{AT*}		D5600 ^{AT*}									
DX (APS-C)	Entry-level									D40^{−E*}			D3000^{−E*}	D3100^{−P*}		D3200^{−P*}	D3300^{*}			D3400^{*}		D3500^{*}							
Early models		SVC (prototype; 1986); QV-1000C (1988); NASA F4 (1991); E2/E2S (1995); E2N/E2NS (1996); E3/E3S (1998)																											
Sensor	Class																												
Sensor	Class	1999	2000	2001	2002	2003	2004	2005	2006	2007	2008	2009	2010	2011	2012	2013	2014	2015	2016	2017	2018	2019	2020	2021	2022	2023	2024	2025	2026
