= Pentax Q-S1 =

Digital camera model

Overview
- Maker: Ricoh

Sensor/medium
- Sensor type: BSI-CMOS, stabilized
- Sensor size: 7.44 x 5.58mm (1/1.7 inch type)
- Maximum resolution: 4000 x 3000 (12 megapixels)
- Film speed: 100-12800
- Recording medium: SD, SDHC or SDXC memory card

Shutter
- Shutter speeds: 1/2000s to 30s leaf, 1/8000s to 2s electronic
- Continuous shooting: 5 frames per second

Image processing
- Image processor: Q Engine
- White balance: Yes

General
- LCD screen: 3 inches with 460,000 dots
- Dimensions: 105 x 58 x 34mm (4.13 x 2.28 x 1.34 inches)
- Weight: 203 g (7 oz) including battery

The Pentax Q-S1 is a compact digital mirrorless interchangeable lens camera announced by Ricoh under the Pentax brand on August 4, 2014. It replaces the Pentax Q7, and is part of Pentax' Q system, the most compact digital interchangeable lens camera system as of September 2014, with crop factors ranging from 4.6 (Q7, Q-S1) to 5.6 (Q, Q10).

The Q-S1 has in-body image stabilization as well as a built in flash. It is available in a variety of color combinations. In video mode it can auto focus while shooting with the 01, 02 and 08 lenses.

Discontinued as of January, 2020.

== See also ==
- List of Pentax products
- List of smallest mirrorless cameras

| Type | Sensor | Class | 2003 | 2004 | 2005 | 2006 | | 2007 | 2008 | 2009 | 2010 | 2011 | 2012 | 2013 | 2014 | 2015 | 2016 | 2017 | 2018 | 2019 | 2020 | 2021 | 2022 | 2023 | 2024 | 2025 |
| DSLR | MF | Professional | | | | | | | | | | 645D | | | | 645Z | | | | | | | | | | |
| DSLR | FF | Professional | | | | | | | | | | | | | | | | K-1 | | K-1 II | | | | | | |
| DSLR | APS-C | High-end | | | | | | | | | | | | | | | K-3 II | | | | | | K-3 III | | | |
| DSLR | APS-C | High-end | | | | | | | | | | | | | K-3 | | | | | | | | | | | |
| DSLR | APS-C | Advanced | | | | | | | | | K-7 | K-5 | | K-5 II / K-5 IIs | | | | | | | | | | | | |
| DSLR | APS-C | Advanced | | *ist D | | | K10D | | K20D | | | | | | | | | KP | | | | | | | | |
| DSLR | APS-C | Midrange | | | | | K100D | 100DS | K200D | | | | | K-30 | K-50 | | | K-70 | | | | | | KF | | |
| DSLR | APS-C | Entry-level | | | *ist DS | *ist DS2 | | | | | | K-r | | | K-500 | K-S2 | | | | | | | | | | |
| DSLR | APS-C | Entry-level | | | *ist DL | DL2 | K110D | | | K-m/K2000 | K-x | | | | | K-S1 | | | | | | | | | | |
| MILC | APS-C | K-mount | | | | | | | | | | | K-01 | | | | | | | | | | | | | |
| MILC | 1/1.7" | Q-mount | | | | | | | | | | | | | Q7 | | | | | | | | | | | |
| MILC | 1/1.7" | Q-mount | | | | | | | | | | | | | | Q-S1 | | | | | | | | | | |
| MILC | 1/2.3" | Q-mount | | | | | | | | | | | Q | Q10 | | | | | | | | | | | | |
| DSLR | Prototypes | | MZ-D (2000); 645D Prototype (2006); AP 50th Anniv. (2007) | | | | | | | | | | | | | | | | | | | | | | | |
| Type | Sensor | Class | | | | | | | | | | | | | | | | | | | | | | | | |
| Type | Sensor | Class | 2003 | 2004 | 2005 | 2006 | | 2007 | 2008 | 2009 | 2010 | 2011 | 2012 | 2013 | 2014 | 2015 | 2016 | 2017 | 2018 | 2019 | 2020 | 2021 | 2022 | 2023 | 2024 | 2025 |
