= Pentax Q =

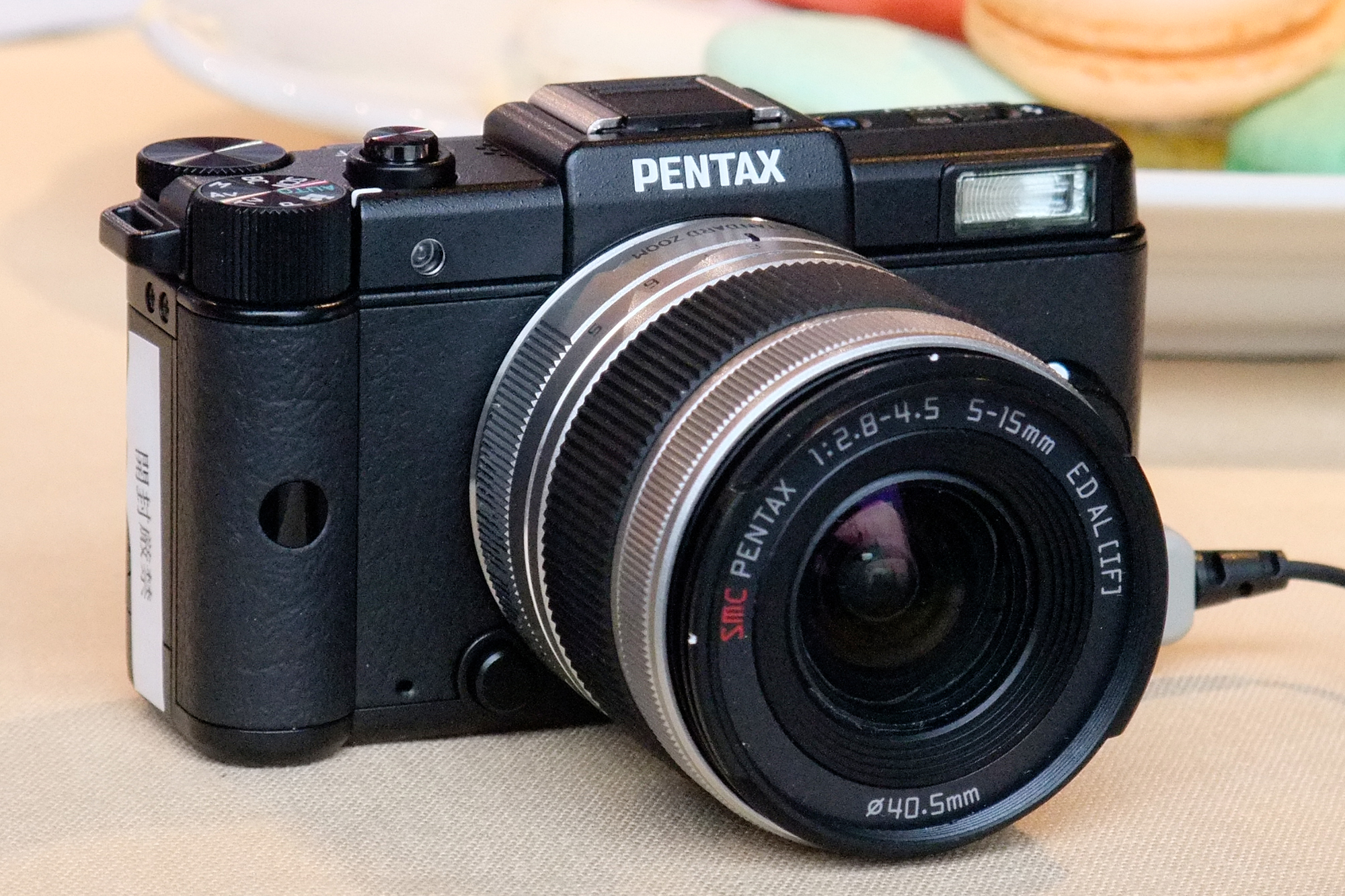
- Pentax Q with zoom lens

Overview
- Maker: Pentax
- Type: Mirrorless

Lens
- Lens mount: Pentax Q-mount, bayonet, stainless steel mount

Sensor/medium
- Sensor type: BSI-CMOS sensor
- Sensor size: 1/2.3 in (6.17 x 4.55 mm) (1/1.7 in for Q7 and Q-S1), 12.4 megapixel
- Maximum resolution: 4:3 native: 4000 x 3000, 3456x2592, 2688x2016, 1920x1440
- Film speed: 125-6400 (Q, Q10), 100-12800 (Q7, Q-S1)
- Recording medium: SD, SDHC, SDXC

Focusing
- Focus: autofocus with manual override

Flash
- Flash: built-in: P-TTL, popup extension, GN 7m, 1/2000 s sync (leaf shutter), 1/13 s (electronic); external P-TTL, 1/250 s sync

Shutter
- Frame rate: 5-frame burst; 1.5fps sustained
- Shutter: electronic, leaf shutter in lens where applicable
- Shutter speeds: 30 s to 1/2000 s mechanical; 2 s to 1/8000 s electronic

Viewfinder
- Viewfinder: optional optical suitable for 8.5 mm f/1.9 lens

Image processing
- White balance: auto, CTE, manual set; presets: daylight, shade, cloudy, fluorescent (D, N, W, L), tungsten, flash; fine adjustment available in all modes

General
- Video recording: 1920x1080 30fps, 1280x720 30fps, 640x480 30fps
- LCD screen: 360x320x4 luminance-R-G-B HVGA; color LCD
- Battery: proprietary, rechargeable li-ion battery, Pentax D-LI68
- Data port: USB 2.0
- Body features: mechanical sensor-shift image stabilization (photography); electronic image stabilization (video)
- Dimensions: 98×57×31 mm (3.9×2.2×1.2 in) (3.86 * 2.24 * 1.22")
- Weight: 180 g (0.40 lb / 6.35 oz)
- Made in: Philippines

The Pentax Q is a mirrorless interchangeable-lens camera introduced by Pentax on June 23, 2011.

== Characteristics ==
Introduced as "The world's smallest interchangeable lens system camera..." The Pentax Q system is composed of four bodies (Q, Q10, Q7, Q-S1) and eight lenses: the 01 prime normal, the 02 wide-tele zoom, 03 fish-eye, the 04 "toy" wide angle, the 05 "toy" telephoto, the 06 telephoto zoom, the 07 "mount shield" lens, and the 08 ultra-wide zoom. The zooms and prime normal lenses have leaf shutters (with built-in neutral density filters) and sync with flash up to 1/2000 of a second. The other lenses use the camera's electronic shutter. The 09 macro lens was prototyped but never released. Modern Pentax K mount lenses can be used on the Q with an adapter that has a mechanical shutter. Other adapted lenses use the electronic shutter.

The camera's small sensor size (1/2.3 inches) means that the Q has a crop factor of 5.6× (compared to full-frame 35mm cameras), as well as a short flange focal distance (FFD). With the 5.6× crop factor, a 100mm macro lens (for example) results in a 35mm equivalent field of view (FOV) of a 560mm telephoto. An additional implication of the 5.6× crop factor and associated optics is that depth of field (DOF) is increased proportionally for a given aperture setting (in comparison to the 35mm equivalent DOF at the same aperture). This means that in some applications the small Pentax Q sensor offers an advantage over larger formats. This also allows the Pentax Q lenses to be proportionally smaller than lenses designed for larger formats.

The short FFD of the Pentax Q enables it to accept manual focus lenses from many manufacturers (via adapters) including Nikon F, Leica M and M39, Olympus OM, Canon FD, Minolta, M42 screw mount, C-mount, D-mount, M12 mount, Pentax K, and Pentax Auto 110.

The Pentax Q has a wide range of digital effects and controls including high dynamic range (HDR), multiple scene modes, and a bokeh function which, when activated, can enable a pseudo shallow-focus effect.

The camera is equipped with sensor-shift image stabilization technology to improve image quality at slow shutter speeds or when using telephoto lenses. It has a focus peaking function as well. Sensor shift and focus peaking functions also work with adapted lenses.

The Q7 and Q-S1 models have a larger sensor size (1/1.7 inches) resulting in a crop factor of 4.6×.

== See also ==
- List of Pentax products
- List of smallest mirrorless cameras

Type	Sensor	Class	2003	2004	2005	2006		2007	2008	2009	2010	2011	2012	2013	2014	2015	2016	2017	2018	2019	2020	2021	2022	2023	2024	2025
DSLR	MF	Professional										645D				645Z										
DSLR	FF	Professional																K-1		K-1 II						
DSLR	APS-C	High-end															K-3 II						K-3 III			
DSLR	APS-C	High-end													K-3											
DSLR	APS-C	Advanced									K-7	K-5		K-5 II / K-5 IIs												
DSLR	APS-C	Advanced		*ist D			K10D		K20D									KP								
DSLR	APS-C	Midrange					K100D	100DS	K200D					K-30	K-50			K-70						KF		
DSLR	APS-C	Entry-level			*ist DS	*ist DS2						K-r			K-500	K-S2										
DSLR	APS-C	Entry-level			*ist DL	DL2	K110D			K-m/K2000	K-x					K-S1										
MILC	APS-C	K-mount											K-01													
MILC	1/1.7"	Q-mount													Q7											
MILC	1/1.7"	Q-mount														Q-S1										
MILC	1/2.3"	Q-mount											Q	Q10												
DSLR	Prototypes		MZ-D (2000); 645D Prototype (2006); AP 50th Anniv. (2007)																							
Type	Sensor	Class																								
Type	Sensor	Class	2003	2004	2005	2006		2007	2008	2009	2010	2011	2012	2013	2014	2015	2016	2017	2018	2019	2020	2021	2022	2023	2024	2025
