= Pentax Q series =

Digital camera product line

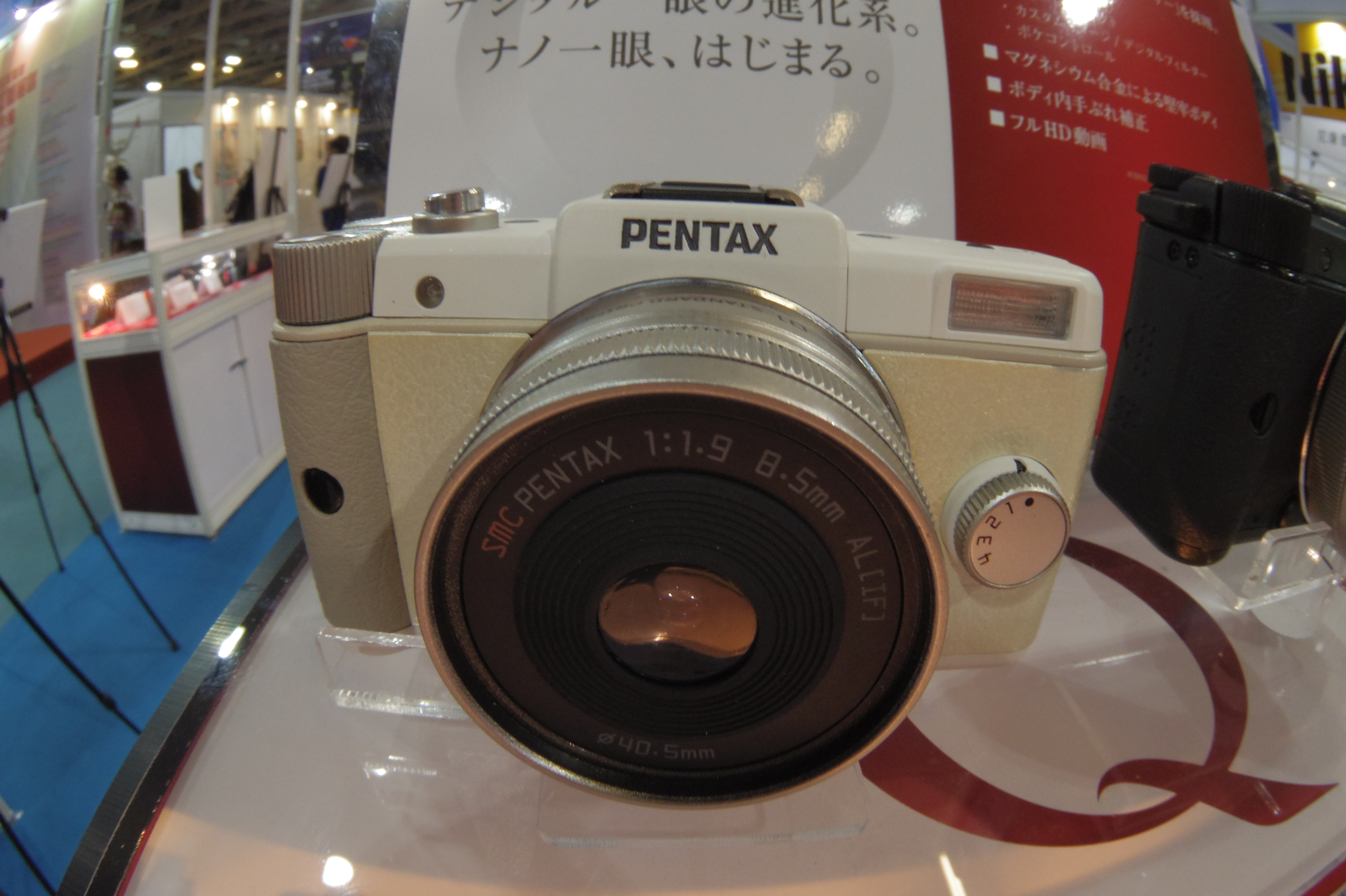
Pentax Q.

The Pentax Q series is a series of mirrorless interchangeable-lens cameras made by Pentax and introduced in 2011 with the initial model Pentax Q. As of September 2012, it was the world's smallest, lightest interchangeable lens digital camera. The first models used a 1/2.3" (6.17 x 4.55 mm) back-illuminated sensor CMOS image sensor. The Q7, introduced in June 2013, uses a larger 1/1.7" type sensor (7.44 x 5.58 mm). The Q system is now discontinued.

== Characteristics ==
The Pentax Q and Q10 sensors have a crop factor of 5.53× while the Pentax Q7 and Q-s1 have a crop factor of 4.65×. The original Pentax Q sensor has a 12.4 megapixels with 1.52 μm pixel pitch. All Pentax Q system cameras have a short flange focal distance (FFD) of 9.2mm. With a 5.53× crop factor, an adapted 100mm lens has the equivalent field of view (FOV) of a 553mm telephoto in the 35mm full-frame format. An additional implication of these relatively large crop factors is that depth of field (DOF) is proportionally increased relative to full-frame systems at the same equivalent focal length and aperture; this puts the Pentax Q system cameras at a distinct advantage when capturing as much as possible with acceptable focus is important.

Pentax Q system cameras do not have a mechanical shutter or neutral density filter in the camera body. Because of this, some lenses and adapters have a built-in mechanical leaf shutter and/or a built-in ND filter.

The short flange focal distance of the Pentax Q series enables lenses from many manufacturers to be adapted to it, including Olympus OM, Canon FD, Minolta, M42 screw mount, M39 Leica, C-Mount, D-Mount, Pentax K, and Pentax 6×7. A Pentax adapter with a synchronized shutter for Pentax K-mount lenses was released in October 2012.

The camera is equipped with "SR" sensor-shift image stabilization technology to improve image quality when using the camera without a tripod. It works with all native and adapted lenses. The Pentax Q also features a "blur control" mode to provide a pseudo shallow focus effect when desired.

== Models ==
=== Pentax Q ===
The initial model was announced in June, 2011.

=== Pentax Q10 ===
Announced in September, 2012, the Q10 has a slightly redesigned body and an improved sensor. Most features and specifications were unchanged.

=== Pentax Q7 ===
The Q7 was announced in June 2013 and has a larger 1/1.7" sensor. It is available in a wide variety of colors.

=== Pentax Q-S1 ===
The Q-S1 was announced August 4, 2014. It has a 1/1.7" sensor. In addition to the Q-7 features, it has auto focusing in the video mode (with the 01, 02 and 08 lenses.)

== Lenses ==
Eight lenses have been released in the Pentax Q system. (AF = Auto Focus, MF = Manual Focus):

| Mfg. | Lens | Type | Focal Length | 35mm Equiv (Q, Q10) | 35mm Equiv (Q7, Q-S1) | Max. Aperture | Min. Aperture | Leaf Shutter | Filter Diameter | Year |
|---|---|---|---|---|---|---|---|---|---|---|
| Pentax | 01 Standard Prime | AF/MF, single-focal | 8.5 mm | 47 mm | 39 mm | 1.9 | 8 | yes | 40.5mm | 2011 |
| Pentax | 02 Standard Zoom | AF/MF, varifocal | 5–15 mm | 27.5–83 mm | 23–69 mm | 2.8-4.5 | 8 | yes | 40.5mm | 2011 |
| Pentax | 03 Fisheye | MF, single-focal | 3.2 mm | 17.5 mm | 16.5 mm | 5.6 | 5.6 | no | n/a | 2011 |
| Pentax | 04 Toy Lens Wide | MF, single-focal | 6.3 mm | 35 mm | 33 mm | 7.1 | 7.1 | no | n/a | 2011 |
| Pentax | 05 Toy Lens Telephoto | MF, single-focal | 18 mm | 100 mm | 94 mm | 8 | 8 | no | n/a | 2011 |
| Pentax | 06 Telephoto Zoom | AF/MF, varifocal | 15–45 mm | 83–249 mm | 69–207 mm | 2.8 | 8.0 | yes | 40.5mm | 2012 |
| Pentax | 07 Mount Shield Lens | Fixed focus, single focal | 11.5 mm | 63.5 mm | 53 mm | 9 | 9 | no | n/a | 2013 |
| Pentax | 08 Wide Zoom | AF/MF, varifocal | 3.8-5.9 mm | 21–32.5 mm | 17.5–27 mm | 3.7 - 4 | 7.1 - 8 | yes | 49.0mm | 2013 |
| Pentax | Adapter Q for K-Mount Lens | n/a* | See below** | Approx. 5.6 times the focal length of lens | Approx. 4.5 times the focal length of lens | See below*** | See below**** | yes | See below** | 2012 |

Notes: *Any lenses adapted to the adapter will function in MF only. Whether it is single or varifocal depends on the optical characteristic of the lens.

**Although the adapter itself cannot have a focal length or filter diameter, the focal length/filter diameter for adapter/lens combination will depend on the lens attached.

***The maximum aperture depends on the lens aperture for most lenses. However, for larger-aperture lenses, since the adapter controls the aperture, the effective f-stop may increase or falloff may become more apparent.

****The minimum aperture depends on the adapter.

== See also ==
- Pentax Auto 110
- List of Pentax products
- List of smallest mirrorless cameras

| Type | Sensor | Class | 2003 | 2004 | 2005 | 2006 | | 2007 | 2008 | 2009 | 2010 | 2011 | 2012 | 2013 | 2014 | 2015 | 2016 | 2017 | 2018 | 2019 | 2020 | 2021 | 2022 | 2023 | 2024 | 2025 |
| DSLR | MF | Professional | | | | | | | | | | 645D | | | | 645Z | | | | | | | | | | |
| DSLR | FF | Professional | | | | | | | | | | | | | | | | K-1 | | K-1 II | | | | | | |
| DSLR | APS-C | High-end | | | | | | | | | | | | | | | K-3 II | | | | | | K-3 III | | | |
| DSLR | APS-C | High-end | | | | | | | | | | | | | K-3 | | | | | | | | | | | |
| DSLR | APS-C | Advanced | | | | | | | | | K-7 | K-5 | | K-5 II / K-5 IIs | | | | | | | | | | | | |
| DSLR | APS-C | Advanced | | *ist D | | | K10D | | K20D | | | | | | | | | KP | | | | | | | | |
| DSLR | APS-C | Midrange | | | | | K100D | 100DS | K200D | | | | | K-30 | K-50 | | | K-70 | | | | | | KF | | |
| DSLR | APS-C | Entry-level | | | *ist DS | *ist DS2 | | | | | | K-r | | | K-500 | K-S2 | | | | | | | | | | |
| DSLR | APS-C | Entry-level | | | *ist DL | DL2 | K110D | | | K-m/K2000 | K-x | | | | | K-S1 | | | | | | | | | | |
| MILC | APS-C | K-mount | | | | | | | | | | | K-01 | | | | | | | | | | | | | |
| MILC | 1/1.7" | Q-mount | | | | | | | | | | | | | Q7 | | | | | | | | | | | |
| MILC | 1/1.7" | Q-mount | | | | | | | | | | | | | | Q-S1 | | | | | | | | | | |
| MILC | 1/2.3" | Q-mount | | | | | | | | | | | Q | Q10 | | | | | | | | | | | | |
| DSLR | Prototypes | | MZ-D (2000); 645D Prototype (2006); AP 50th Anniv. (2007) | | | | | | | | | | | | | | | | | | | | | | | |
| Type | Sensor | Class | | | | | | | | | | | | | | | | | | | | | | | | |
| Type | Sensor | Class | 2003 | 2004 | 2005 | 2006 | | 2007 | 2008 | 2009 | 2010 | 2011 | 2012 | 2013 | 2014 | 2015 | 2016 | 2017 | 2018 | 2019 | 2020 | 2021 | 2022 | 2023 | 2024 | 2025 |
