= Pentax Auto 110 =

Single-lens reflex camera made by Asahi Pentax that use Kodak's 110 film cartridge

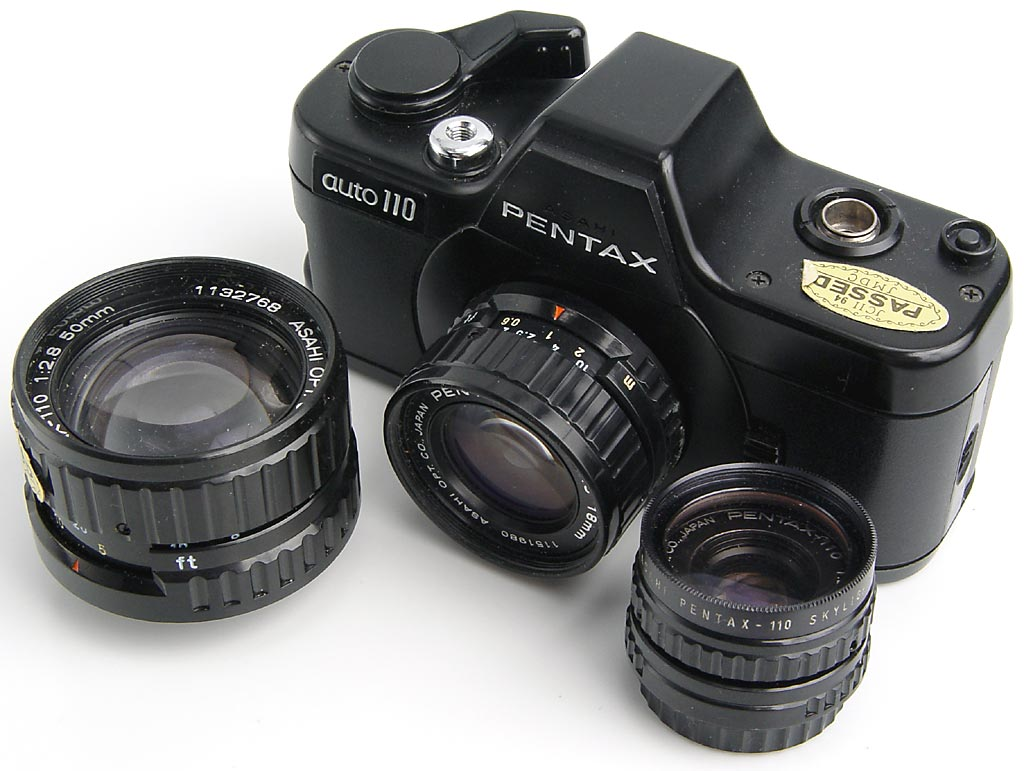
Pentax Auto 110 with the three original lenses.

The Pentax Auto 110 and Pentax Auto 110 Super were fully automatic single-lens reflex cameras manufactured by Asahi Pentax for use with Kodak 110 film cartridges. The Auto 110 was introduced with three interchangeable, fixed focal length lenses in 1978. A further three lenses (including one zoom lens) were added in 1981 to coincide with the release of the Auto 110 Super the following year. The camera system was sold until 1985. The complete system is sometimes known as the Pentax System 10, apparently for its official Pentax name, although most Pentax advertising only uses the camera name or Pentax-110. This model represented the only complete ultraminiature SLR system manufactured for the 110 film format, although several fixed-lens 110 SLRs were sold. The camera system also claims to be the smallest interchangeable-lens SLR system ever created.

== Auto 110 ==
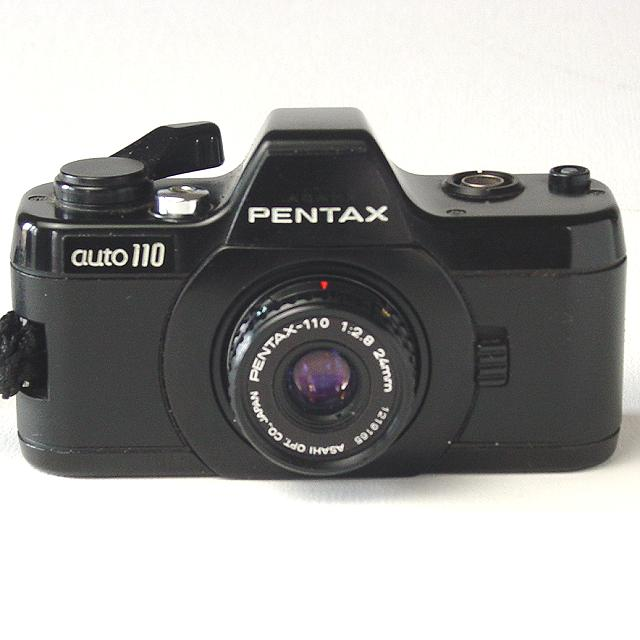
Asahi Pentax Auto 110

The Pentax Auto 110 features fully automatic exposure, with no user-settable exposure compensation or adjustments. Metering is TTL (through-the-lens) and center-weighted. Unlike 35 mm SLRs, the system's lenses do not have a built-in iris to control the aperture. Instead, an iris is mounted inside the camera body, and functions as both an aperture control and a shutter. This mechanism is capable of programmed exposures between 1/750 s at f/13.5; and 1 s at f/2.8. To ensure that light travelling past the diaphragm blades could not get through to the film over time, the camera's mirror system also functions as a light-tight seal when in the viewing and focusing position. Since the iris is part of the camera, all of the system's lenses had to be constructed with an f/2.8 aperture. The lens' designs, based upon the film dimensions, result in the 24 mm lens being the 'normal' focal length (i.e. equivalent angle of view to a 50 mm lens on a 135 format camera), while lenses of wider angles or longer focal lengths were larger.

=== Film speed detection ===
The camera detects the film speed by the presence or absence of a ridge on the cartridge, as specified in the Kodak 110 film standard. Since there is no official specification of what the film speeds should actually be—they were just "low" and "high"—film and camera manufacturers had to decide for themselves the meaning. Pentax chose ISO 80 and 320 as their settings, but commercially available films at ISO 100 and 400 are close enough to work in practice. A film with an ISO 200 speed would result in either under- or over-exposure. The exposure latitude of color print films is about 2 f/stops (meaning that a photographer could expose either 2 f/stops under or 2 f/stops over the exposure set by the camera). Unfortunately, some recently produced 110 film is rated at ISO 400, but is packaged with the ridge indicating "low". If this is the case, the ridge must be removed (by filing or cutting with a sharp blade) for the camera to expose correctly. Since only a few 110 cameras ever supported the ISO auto-selection, this does not affect the majority of cameras using the format but does affect the Pentax Auto 110. In 2012/2013 ISO 100 film has been produced and marketed under the Lomography label, and gives excellent results, without the need to modify the cartridge casing.

The camera was offered in a special edition "Safari" model, identical to the Auto 110 except for the brown-and-tan color scheme.

== Auto 110 Super ==
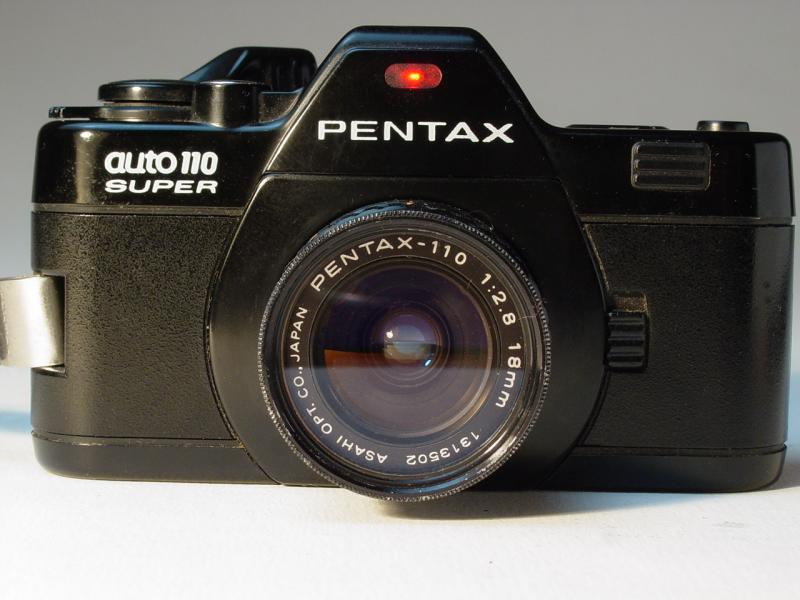
Asahi Pentax Auto 110 Super

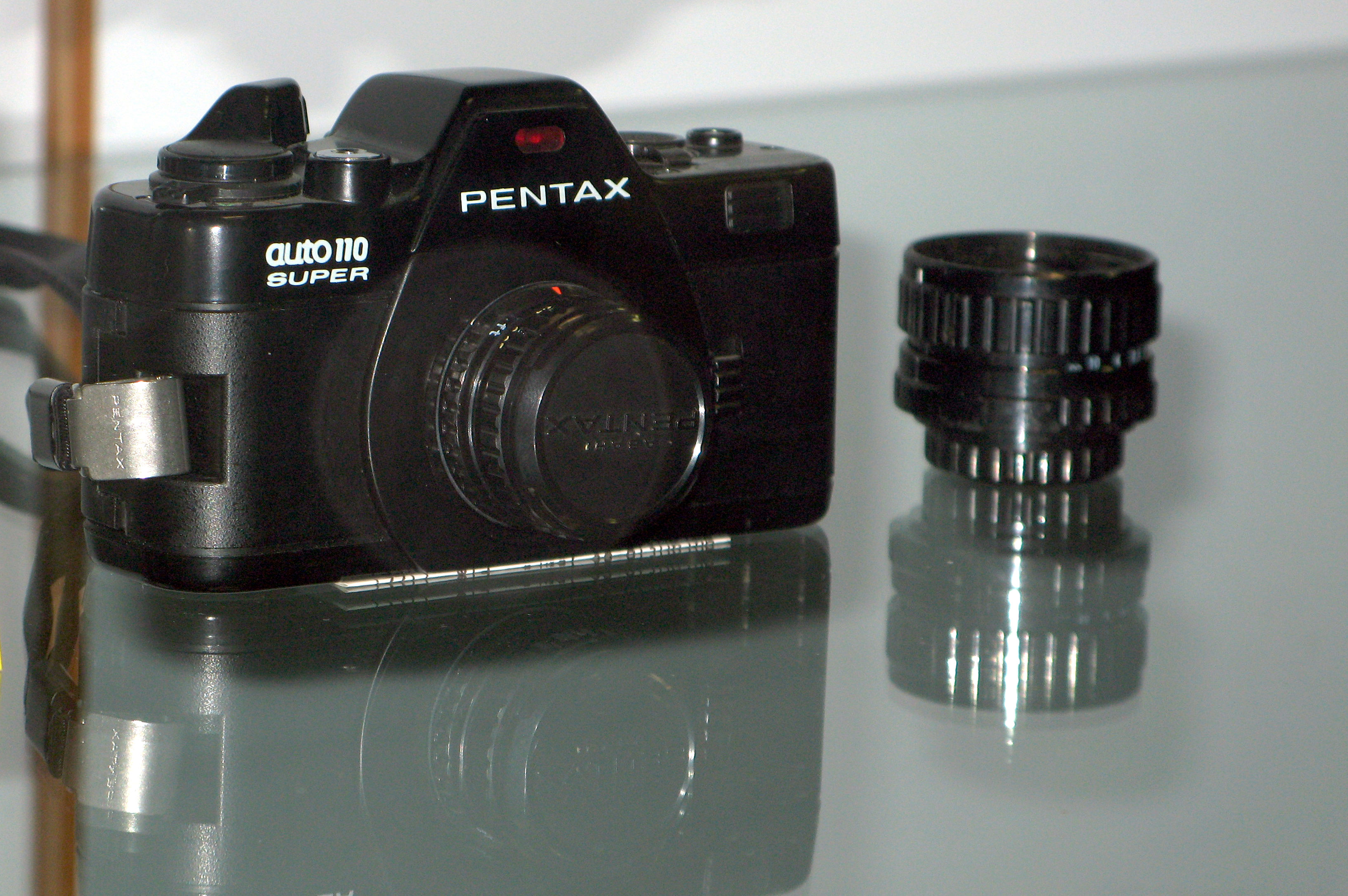
Asahi Pentax Auto 110 Super

Introduced in late 1982, the Super is nearly identical in basic shape and size to the previous model and accepts the same lenses. Many improvements and changes were included to make this model arguably a better camera than the previous Auto 110. Film winding is improved with a single-stroke film advance lever that advances the film and cocks the shutter in one winding (the Auto 110 takes two strokes to advance the film). A switch around the shutter release button enables a new ten-second self-timer mode and a shutter lock; the self-timer activates a red light on the pentaprism housing, which flashes during the 10-second shutter release count-down. A button on the front on the user's left hand side gives a +1.5 EV (exposure value) backlit scene exposure compensation.

The optional winder offers an improved battery cover, a well-known weak component in the Auto 110. The shutter button is protected from accidental tripping by an altered casing around the button. The flash synchronization socket cover on the Super is permanently attached to the camera in an attempt to prevent loss, though many still get lost when the plastic tether breaks.

The viewfinder screen has a split image rangefinder center, surrounded by a microprism collar, whereas the Auto 110 has the split image rangefinder center only. The low light warning activates at 1/45 s (the Auto 110 activates at 1/30 s).

== Lenses ==
The line of lenses consisted of these three at launch:

- 18 mm f/2.8 wide-angle lens (equivalent angle of view to a 35 mm lens on a 135 format camera), (Filter diameter: 30.5 mm).
- 24 mm f/2.8 normal lens (equiv. 50 mm). The optical design meant that this was the smallest lens on the system. (Filter diameter: 25.5 mm)
- 50 mm f/2.8 telephoto lens (equiv. 100 mm), (Filter diameter: 37.5 mm)

In 1981, three more lenses were included:

- 18 mm "Pan Focus" lens was a compact lens of fixed focus set to the hyperfocal distance; the short focal length and wide aperture meant that its depth of field stretched from 1.75 m (5.7 ft) to infinity. The camera aperture needed to be set at f/6.3 for this lens to work as intended,(Filter diameter: 30.5 mm)
- 70 mm f/2.8 telephoto lens (equiv. 140 mm),(Filter diameter: 49 mm)
- 20–40 mm f/2.8 zoom lens (equiv. 40–80 mm). This lens extended for wider focal lengths and shortened towards the telephoto end, (Filter diameter: 49 mm)

The three later lenses are much rarer.

Soligor also made a 1.7x teleconverter.

Lens hoods were available for all of the lenses, and Pentax sold add-on close-up lenses for macro photography and a range of filters.

The 110 lenses have found a new life with the Pentax Q system, which will accept them with an adapter, albeit with a 5.6x crop factor (effective increase in focal length). The lenses can also be mounted on Panasonic/Olympus Micro Four Thirds cameras with an adapter, and the crop factor is only 2x, the same as on the original Pentax 110 body. Wherever adapted, the lenses still require manual focusing.

The 110 lenses can be adapted to APS-C mirrorless cameras, with little vignetting on 24mm, less on 18mm, and no vignetting on 50mm.

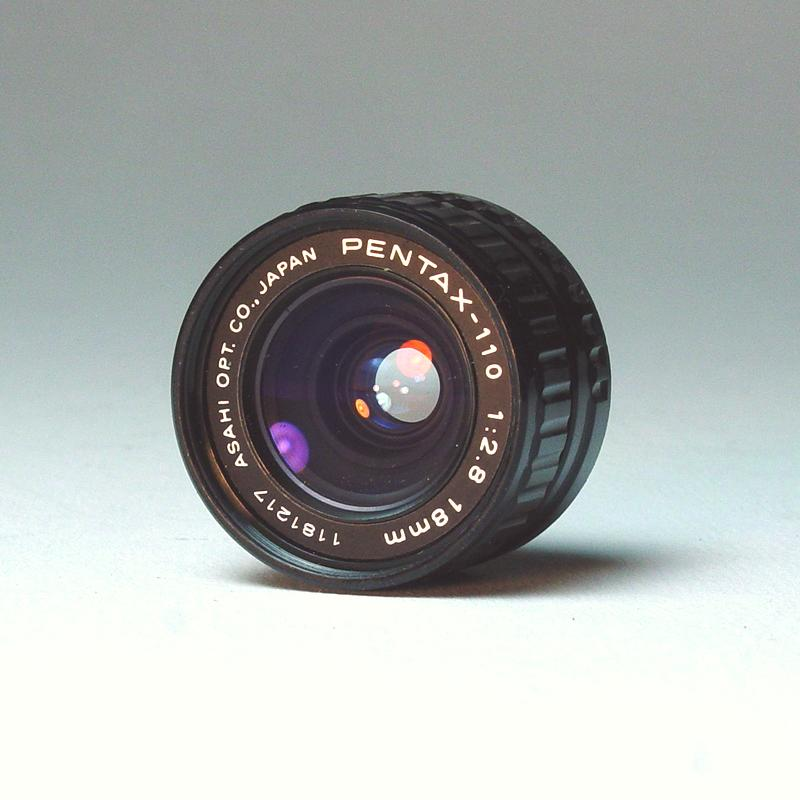
Pentax-110 f/2.8 18 mm

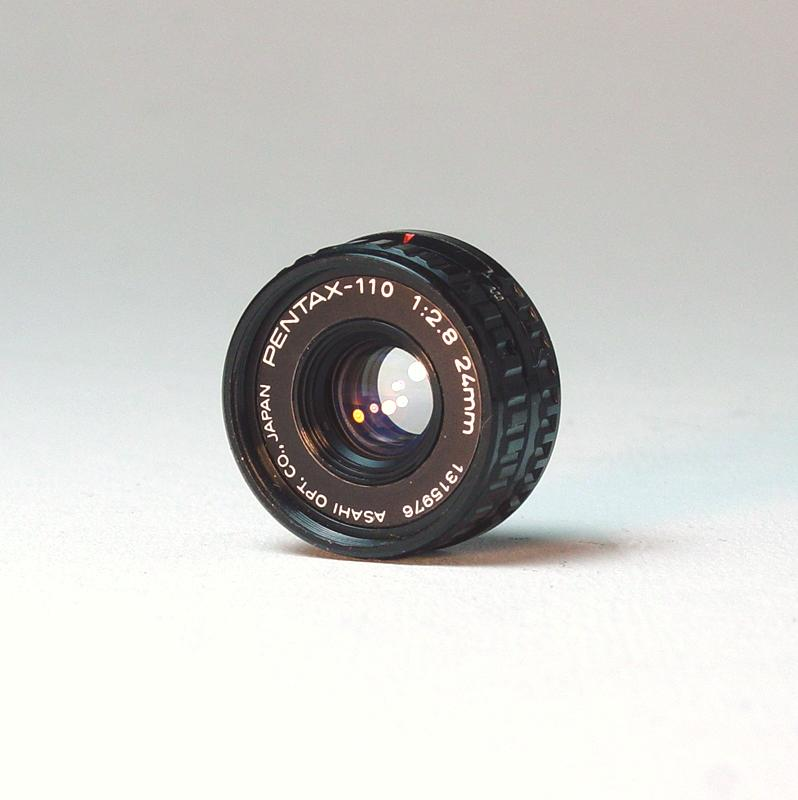
Pentax-110 f/2.8 24 mm

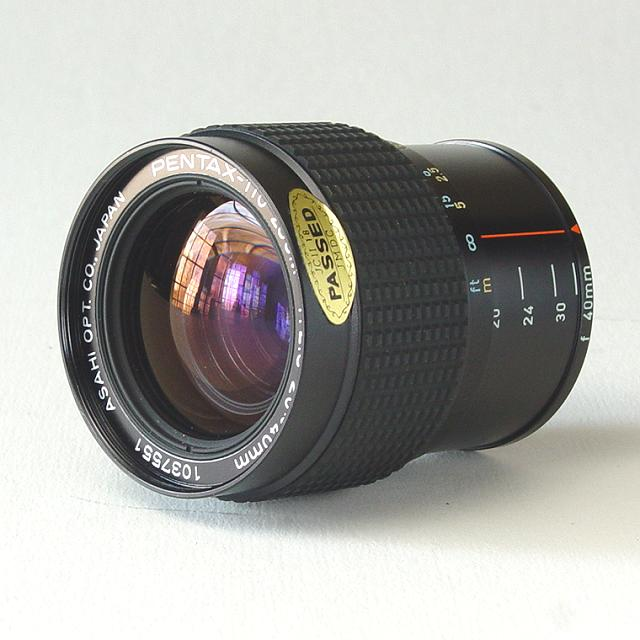
Pentax-110 f/2.8 20~40 mm Zoom

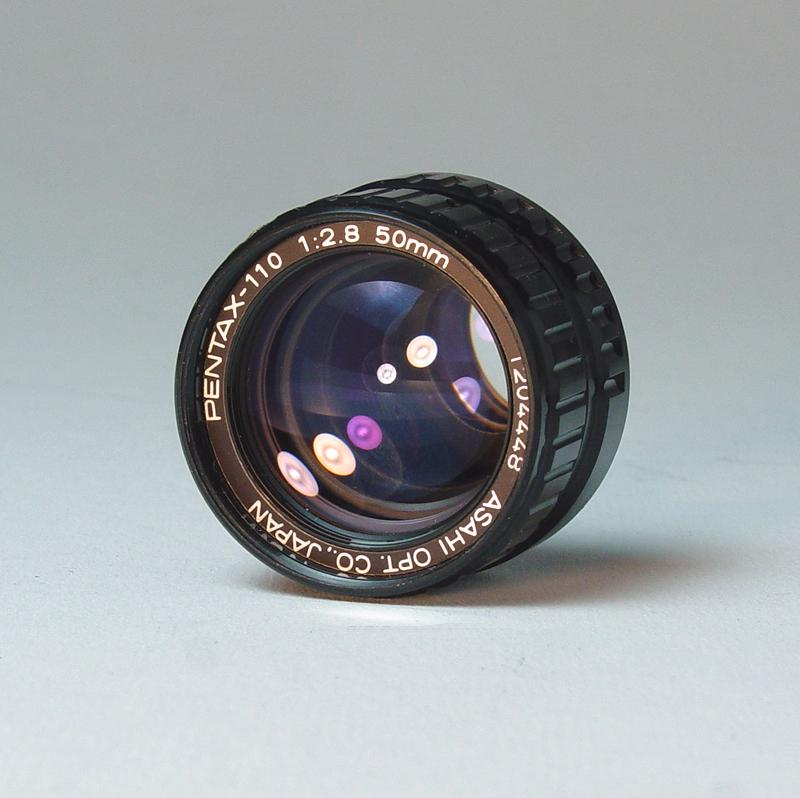
Pentax-110 f/2.8 50 mm

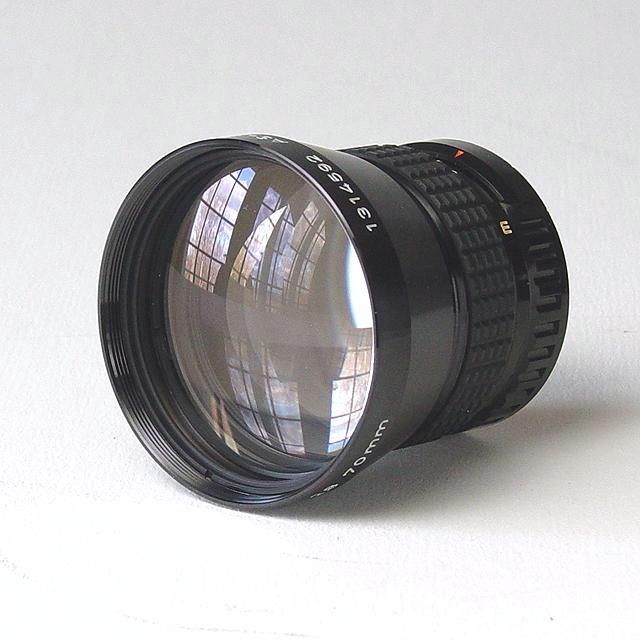
Pentax-110 f/2.8 70 mm

== Winders ==
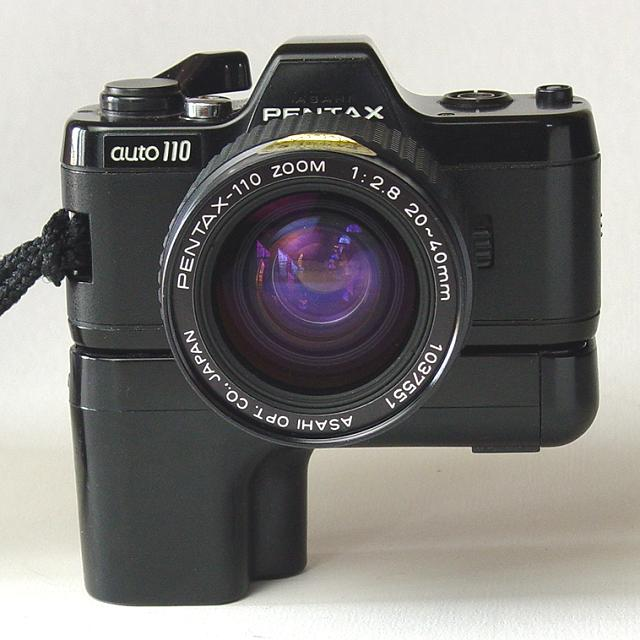
Pentax 110 Winder

Two models of motor winder were produced. The original 110 Winder took 2 AA batteries and could wind through 100 cartridges of 110 film with one set of batteries. It works only in single-shot mode. It takes about 1.5 s to wind a frame. The 110 Winder II, introduced in 1982, adds a continuous shooting mode and improves the battery cover door, which was fragile on the original.

== Flash ==
A custom electronic flash unit, the AF130P, was part of the original Auto 110 system, and was produced until the camera ceased being manufactured. Pentax responded to criticism that this electronic flash unit was too large by introducing the smaller AF100P electronic flash unit in 1980. This unit, however, was never part of the Pentax camera kits and became rare.

== Other accessories ==
Pentax produced a range of various camera-carrying cases and also a belt-clip for the cameras.

== See also ==
- Minolta 110 Zoom SLR
