= Sony Cyber-shot DSC-F717 =

Sony DSC-F717
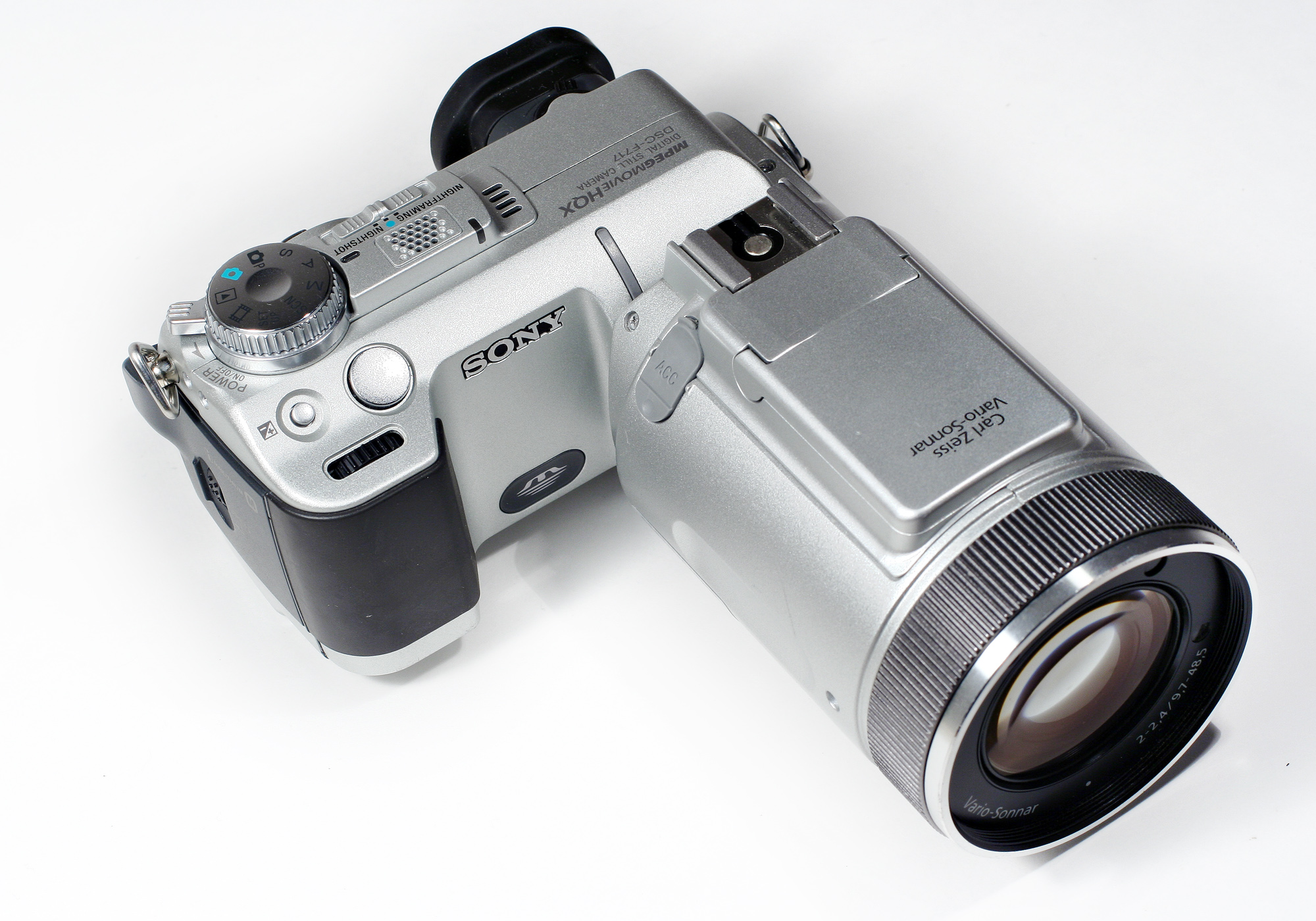

Overview
- Maker: Sony
- Type: Bridge digital camera

Lens
- Lens: Fixed, Carl Zeiss Vario-Sonnar, 38–190 mm equiv. (5× zoom)

Sensor/medium
- Sensor: 8.80 mm × 6.60 mm CCD
- Maximum resolution: 2,560 × 1,920 (5 million)
- Film speed: 100, 200, 400, 800
- Storage media: Memory Stick (PRO)

Focusing
- Focus modes: Single
- Focus areas: AI Multi-Segment

Shutter
- Shutter speed range: 30–1/2000 s
- Continuous shooting: 3 frames @ 2.0 frame/s

Viewfinder
- Viewfinder: Electronic with dioptre adjustment, TFT-LCD

General
- LCD screen: 1.8" / 123,000 pixels
- Weight: 659 g (23 oz) (including battery)

The Sony Cybershot DSC-F717 is a bridge digital camera, introduced by Sony in September 2002.

== Overview ==
F717 features the same 5.0 megapixel CCD sensor and 38–190 mm equiv. Carl Zeiss Vario-Sonnar lens as its predecessor, the 2001 DSC-F707. Major changes / improvements over the F707 include:

- Analog focus ring can now double as a zoom ring
- Addition of a "P" mode, ISO 800 option, and (with constraints) 1/2000 shutter speed
- Better Noise Reduction Algorithm; NR automatically applies for slower than 1/30 shots
- More natural color rendition (in particular, less "red overshoot")
- Quick Review: The last photo can be reviewed by holding on the shutter button after the photo is taken.
- USB 2.0 for faster file transfer to a PC or a printer
- Supports Memory Stick Pro with capacity of 256MB and up (original Memory Stick has a maximum capacity of 128MB per side)

F717 retained all distinctive features from F707, such as:

- Swivel body design: the lens can be rotated from 36 degrees down to 77 degrees up.
- Hologram AF Assist: projects a laser grid to help acquire AF lock in low-light environments.
- NightShot and NightFraming: In these modes, infrared cut-off filter is temporarily lifted away from CCD, enabling IR detection, which practically allows the camera to "see in the dark". Two infrared LEDs provide short-range active IR illumination in both Night modes. In NightShot mode, Aperture and shutter parameters are forced to "auto", because of potential "see through clothing" concerns.
- LCD/EVF switchable via a hard switch on the rear

The F717 was succeeded by DSC-F828 in August 2003.

== Defective batches ==
Some very early production units may experience inaccurate focus with Laser Hologram on. Sony admitted the problem as a minor design flaw, and offered free examination and repair service. Serial numbers of potentially affected units were also announced. According to Sony, it is fixable by correcting a wrong parameter with Sony factory adjustment software. The fix was only performed at Sony service centers.

Around 2004–05, many F717 users reported CCD-related defects. It was later confirmed that many Sony CCDs made from late 2002 to early 2004 suffer from a large-scale manufacturing defect. Interestingly, the aforementioned first-run units seem to be immune to this failure, as they used CCDs built from old production techniques. As a remedy, Sony offered free CCD replacements for affected units until 2007, and in some countries, until 2010. This recall would cover units with expired warranty.
