= Sony Cyber-shot DSC-F828 =

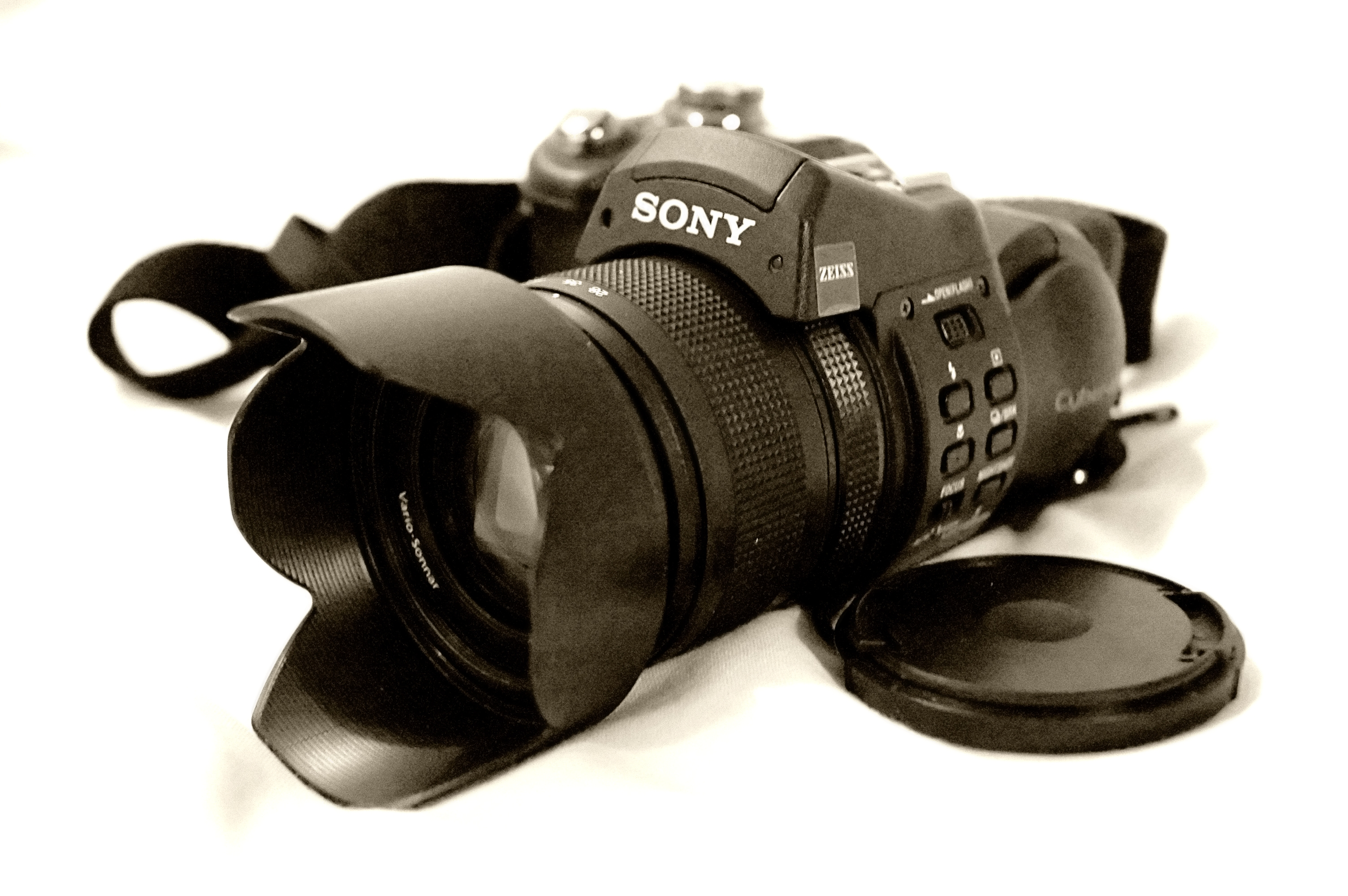

Overview
- Maker: Sony

Lens
- Lens: 28-200mm equivalent
- F-numbers: f/2.0-f/2.8 at the widest

Sensor/medium
- Sensor type: RGBE CCD
- Sensor size: 8.8 x 6.6mm (2/3 inch type)
- Maximum resolution: 3264 x 2448 (8 megapixels)
- Recording medium: Memory Stick or Memory Stick Pro or Compact Flash (Type I or II)

Focusing
- Focus areas: 5 focus points

Shutter
- Shutter speeds: 1/3200s to 30s

Image processing
- White balance: Yes

General
- LCD screen: 1.8 inches with 134,000 dots
- Dimensions: 134 x 91 x 156mm (5.28 x 3.58 x 6.14 inches)
- Weight: 906 g (32 oz) including battery

The Sony Cyber-shot DSC-F828 is a 8.0 megapixel digital bridge camera announced by Sony on August 15, 2003.

== Overview ==
As successor of the DSC-F717, F828 was widely considered "revolutionary" at launch. Major changes / improvements over its predecessor, the 2002 F717 include:

- "Carl Zeiss T*" lens with 7x (28-200mm) zoom range, wider compared to F717's 5x (38-190mm)
- Mechanically-linked zoom ring
- 8.0 megapixel, 2/3 inch, 4-color RGBE CCDs, highest pixel counts in any consumer camera sensors at launch.
- Upgraded electronics for faster focus and post-processing. Continuous AF, and VGA-quality (640x480) filming were made possible.
- Addition of a CompactFlash slot as an alternative to Sony's proprietary Memory Sticks. Although, a Memory Stick Pro is required for VGA-quality filming.
- Shutter speed up to 1/3200s

The F828, along with the "Cyber-shot F" series designation, was discontinued in 2005.

== Reception ==
Despite having attractive on-paper specs, F828 did not fare as well as its predecessor among camera reviewers and photographers. F828 received a "Recommended / Above average" rating from DPReview, in contrast to a "Highly recommended" given to F717.

Visible picture noise, associated with increased pixel density and underdeveloped noise reduction algorithm, was of primary concern. Moreover, the novel RGBE sensor did not bring in much improved color accuracy as expected; this led Sony to drop any further development on such sensors, making F828 the last commercial camera ever to use a 4-color sensor. Many photographers also noted more severe purple fringing on F828s than on its predecessors.

== See also ==
- List of digital cameras with CCD sensors
