= Pentax Q7 =

Overview
- Maker: Pentax

Sensor/medium
- Sensor type: BSI-CMOS, stabilized
- Sensor size: 7.44 x 5.58 mm (1/1.7 inch type)
- Maximum resolution: 4000 x 3000 (12 megapixels)
- Recording medium: SD, SDHC, SDXC or Eye-Fi card

Shutter
- Shutter speeds: 1/2000s to 30s leaf, 1/8000 to 2s electronic
- Continuous shooting: 5 frames per second

Image processing
- White balance: Yes

General
- LCD screen: 3 inches with 460,000 dots
- Dimensions: 102 x 58 x 34 mm (4.02 x 2.28 x 1.34 inches)
- Weight: 200 g (7 oz) including battery

The Pentax Q7 is a compact digital mirrorless interchangeable lens camera announced by Pentax on June 12, 2013. While the camera has a larger sensor than its predecessors, the Q and Q10, it is compatible with existing Q series lenses.

== See also ==
- List of Pentax products
- List of smallest mirrorless cameras

Type	Sensor	Class	2003	2004	2005	2006		2007	2008	2009	2010	2011	2012	2013	2014	2015	2016	2017	2018	2019	2020	2021	2022	2023	2024	2025
DSLR	MF	Professional										645D				645Z										
DSLR	FF	Professional																K-1		K-1 II						
DSLR	APS-C	High-end															K-3 II						K-3 III			
DSLR	APS-C	High-end													K-3											
DSLR	APS-C	Advanced									K-7	K-5		K-5 II / K-5 IIs												
DSLR	APS-C	Advanced		*ist D			K10D		K20D									KP								
DSLR	APS-C	Midrange					K100D	100DS	K200D					K-30	K-50			K-70						KF		
DSLR	APS-C	Entry-level			*ist DS	*ist DS2						K-r			K-500	K-S2										
DSLR	APS-C	Entry-level			*ist DL	DL2	K110D			K-m/K2000	K-x					K-S1										
MILC	APS-C	K-mount											K-01													
MILC	1/1.7"	Q-mount													Q7											
MILC	1/1.7"	Q-mount														Q-S1										
MILC	1/2.3"	Q-mount											Q	Q10												
DSLR	Prototypes		MZ-D (2000); 645D Prototype (2006); AP 50th Anniv. (2007)																							
Type	Sensor	Class																								
Type	Sensor	Class	2003	2004	2005	2006		2007	2008	2009	2010	2011	2012	2013	2014	2015	2016	2017	2018	2019	2020	2021	2022	2023	2024	2025
