= Mirrorless camera =

Compact digital system camera without a reflex mirror

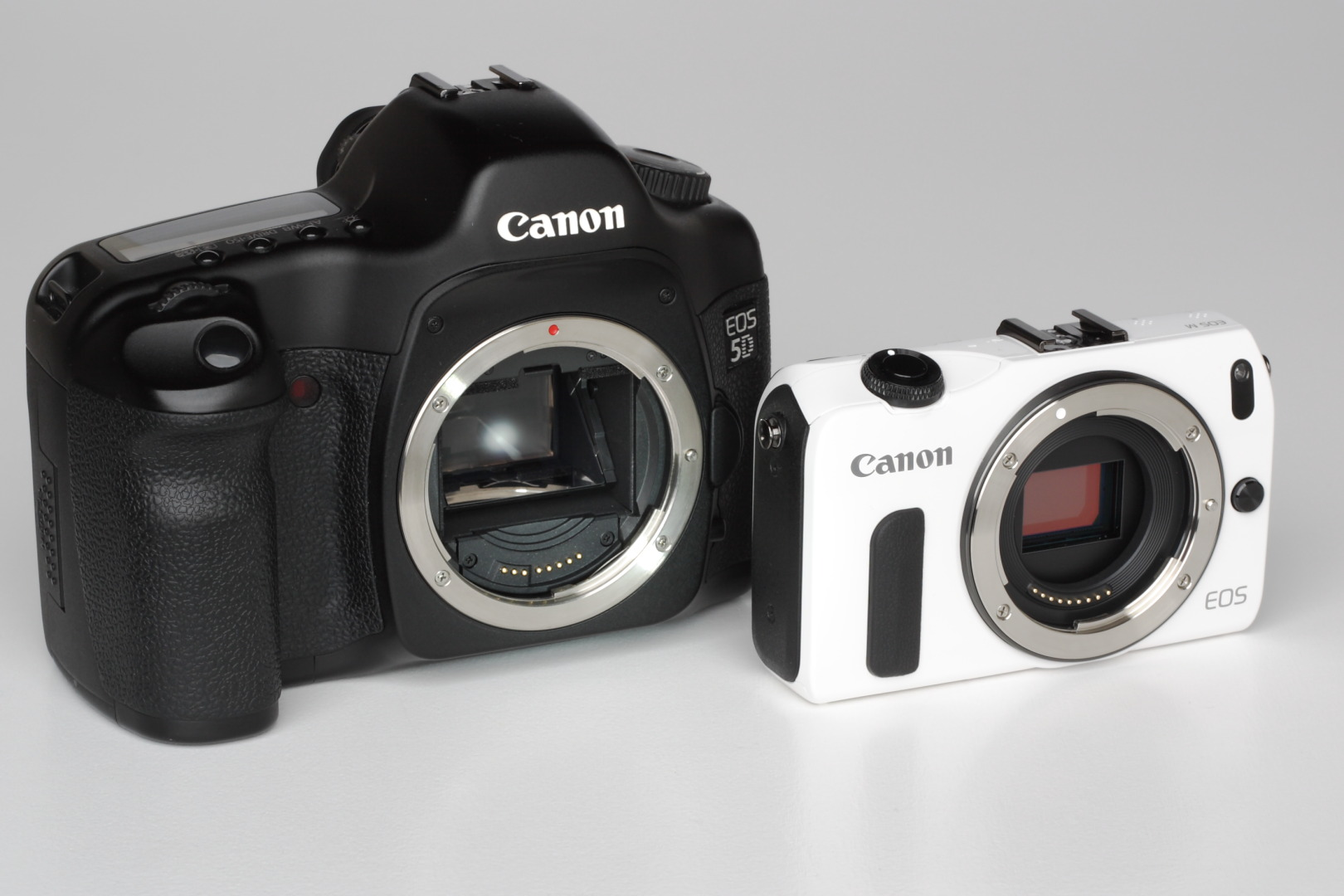
A mirrorless camera (right) with an exposed sensor, next to a DSLR camera (left), which has a mirror in front of the sensor

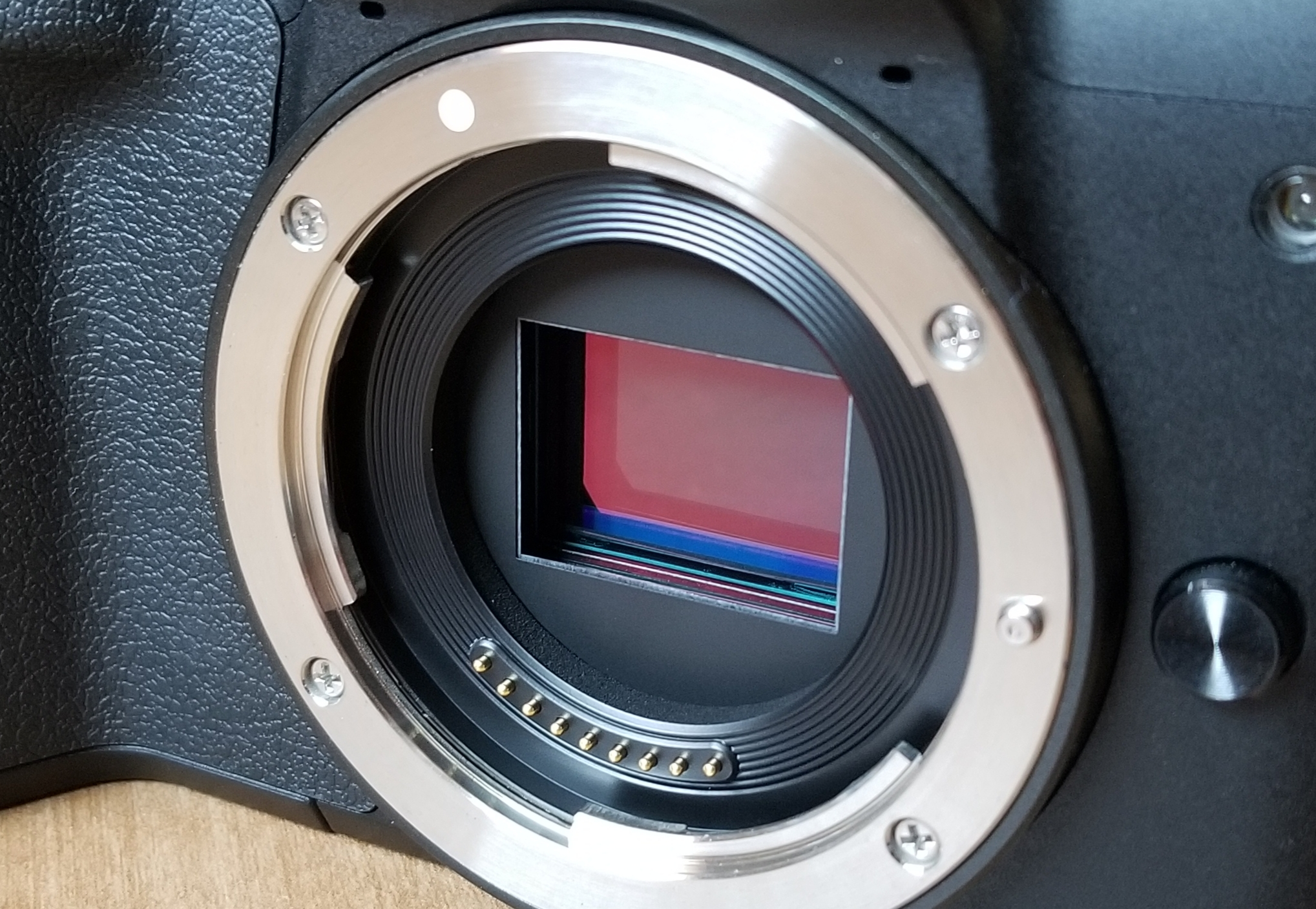
Close-up of the lens mount (silver) and image sensor (red) in a mirrorless camera, showing the small gap between the lens and the sensor, with no mirror assembly

A mirrorless camera is a type of digital camera. Most cameras, including smartphones, lack mirrors, but the term mirrorless is primarily used to describe digital interchangeable lens cameras.

Mirrorless cameras have become the most popular kind of interchangeable lens camera in both professional and amateur use, surpassing DSLRs, which use a mirror system. Lacking mirrors allows mirrorless cameras to be smaller, lighter, and quieter than equivalent DSLRs, but may decrease battery life because of the need to constantly power the sensor and electronic viewfinder (EVF) during use.

In a mirrorless camera, the lens always shines light onto the image sensor, and the picture from the sensor is displayed on a screen for the photographer. Many cameras utilize one or more electronic displays to simulate a traditional viewfinder. In contrast, DSLRs use a mechanical movable mirror sitting behind the lens to direct light to the viewfinder, then redirect it to the image sensor at the moment that a photograph is taken.

Other terms for these cameras include mirrorless interchangeable-lens camera (MILC), electronic viewfinder interchangeable lens (EVIL), compact system camera (CSC), and digital single-lens mirrorless (DSLM).

== Design ==
Mirrorless cameras are mechanically simpler than DSLR cameras, and are smaller, lighter, and quieter due to the elimination of the moving mirror. While nearly all mirrorless cameras have a mechanical shutter, many also have an electronic shutter, allowing completely silent operation.

As the image from the lens is always projected onto the image sensor, features can be available which are only possible in DSLRs when the mirror is locked up into "live view" mode.

Since the viewfinder is a screen, it can display anything, including overlaid graphics that would be impossible in a traditional optical viewfinder. For example, it can show a focus-peaking display, zebra patterning, and face or eye tracking. The electronic viewfinder can provide live previews of depth of field, exposure, white balance and picture style settings, as well as offer a real-time view of camera settings even in extremely low or bright light levels, making it easier to view the results. These features are only available in DSLRs if they use a "live view" mode, in which the mirror locks up and light always shines onto the image sensor, making it act like a mirrorless camera.

With the latest AI autofocus available on newer mirrorless cameras, the autofocus speed and accuracy of newer models has been shown to be better than DSLRs. But mirrorless cameras have shorter battery life than DSLRs due to prolonged use of LCD and/or OLED viewfinder displays. On-sensor autofocus is free of the adjustment requirements of the indirect focusing system of the DSLR (which relies on a separate autofocus sensor located below the reflex mirror), and as of 2025 mirrorless cameras could shoot with AI autofocus at up to 40 frames per second using up to 759 focus points —a number far exceeding what was possible on any DSLR. However, some older mirrorless cameras with on-sensor phase detection autofocus (except for Canon's Dual Pixel Autofocus) repurposes pixel sites for autofocus acquisition, so that image data is partially or entirely missing for the autofocus "pixels", which can cause banding artifacts in the final image.

== History ==
=== Early 2000s: Digital rangefinder origins ===
The first digital rangefinder camera commercially marketed was the Epson R-D1 (released in 2004), followed by the Leica M8 in 2006. They were some of the first digital lens-interchangeable cameras without a reflex mirror, but they are not considered mirrorless cameras because they did not use an electronic viewfinder for live preview, but, rather, an optical viewfinder. Compact cameras with large sensors, technically akin to the current mirrorless cameras, were also marketed in this period. Cameras like Sony Cyber-shot DSC-R1 and Sigma DP1 proved that live preview operation is possible, and useful with APS-C sized sensors.

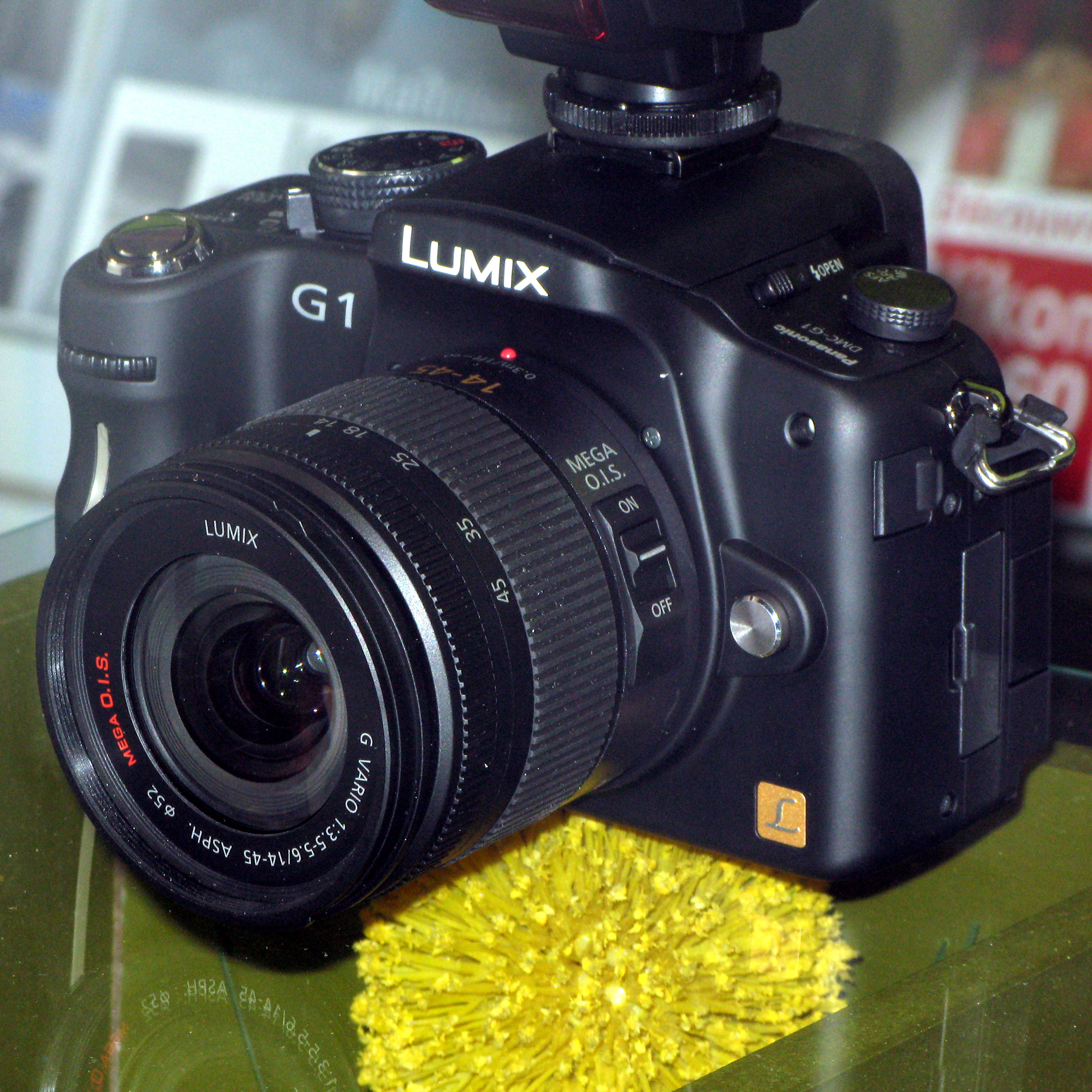
Panasonic Lumix DMC-G1

=== Late 2000s: Micro Four Thirds system ===
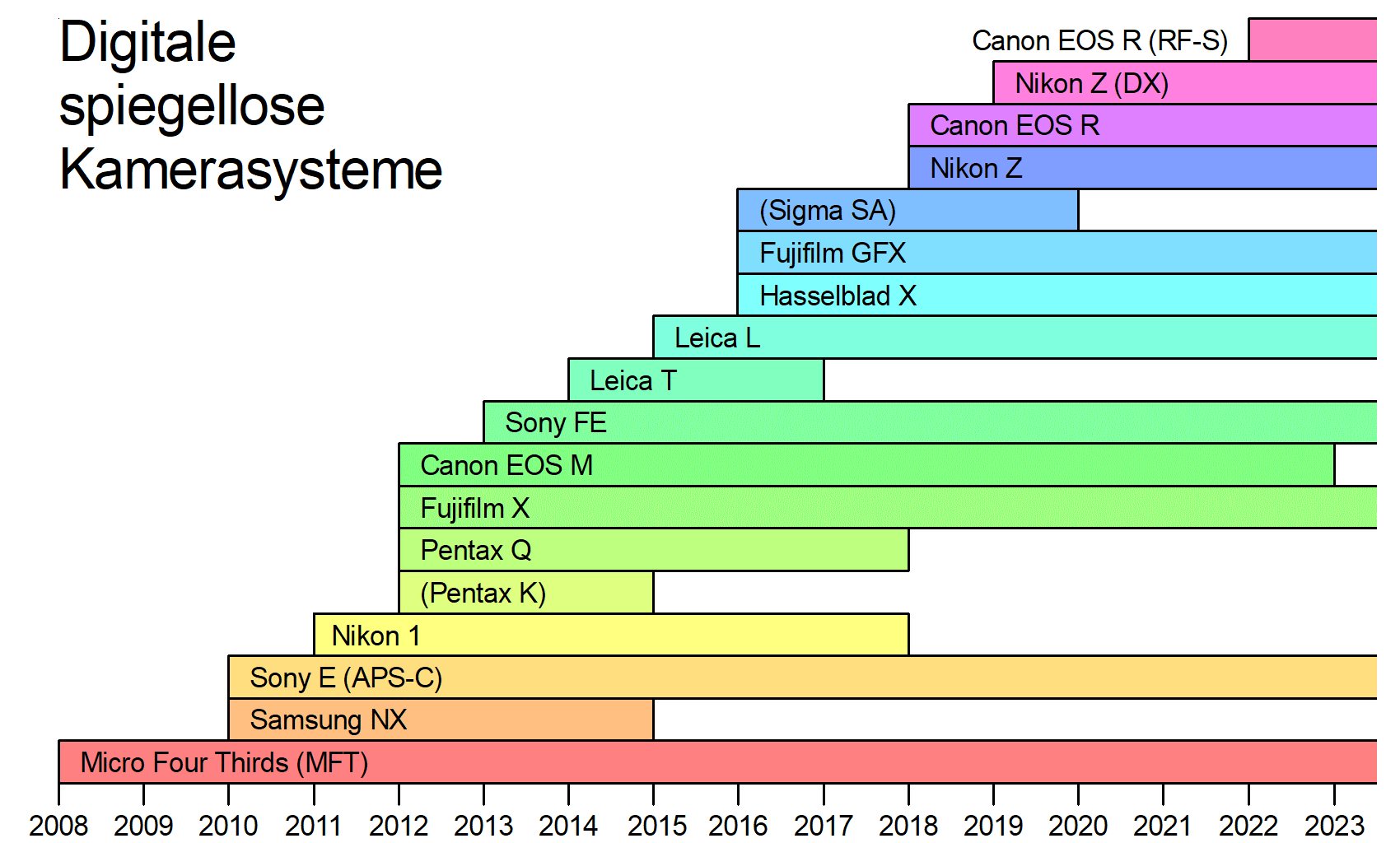
Digital mirrorless camera systems since 2008

The first mirrorless camera commercially marketed was the Panasonic Lumix DMC-G1, released in Japan in October 2008. It was also the first camera of Micro Four Thirds system, developed exclusively for the mirrorless ILC system. The term mirrorless came into use in order to describe Micro Four Thirds cameras when they were announced in 2008, especially as the first Micro Four Thirds camera, the Lumix G1, was designed to be as similar to a DSLR as possible. There are other terms that were created, too, but mirrorless became the most popular.

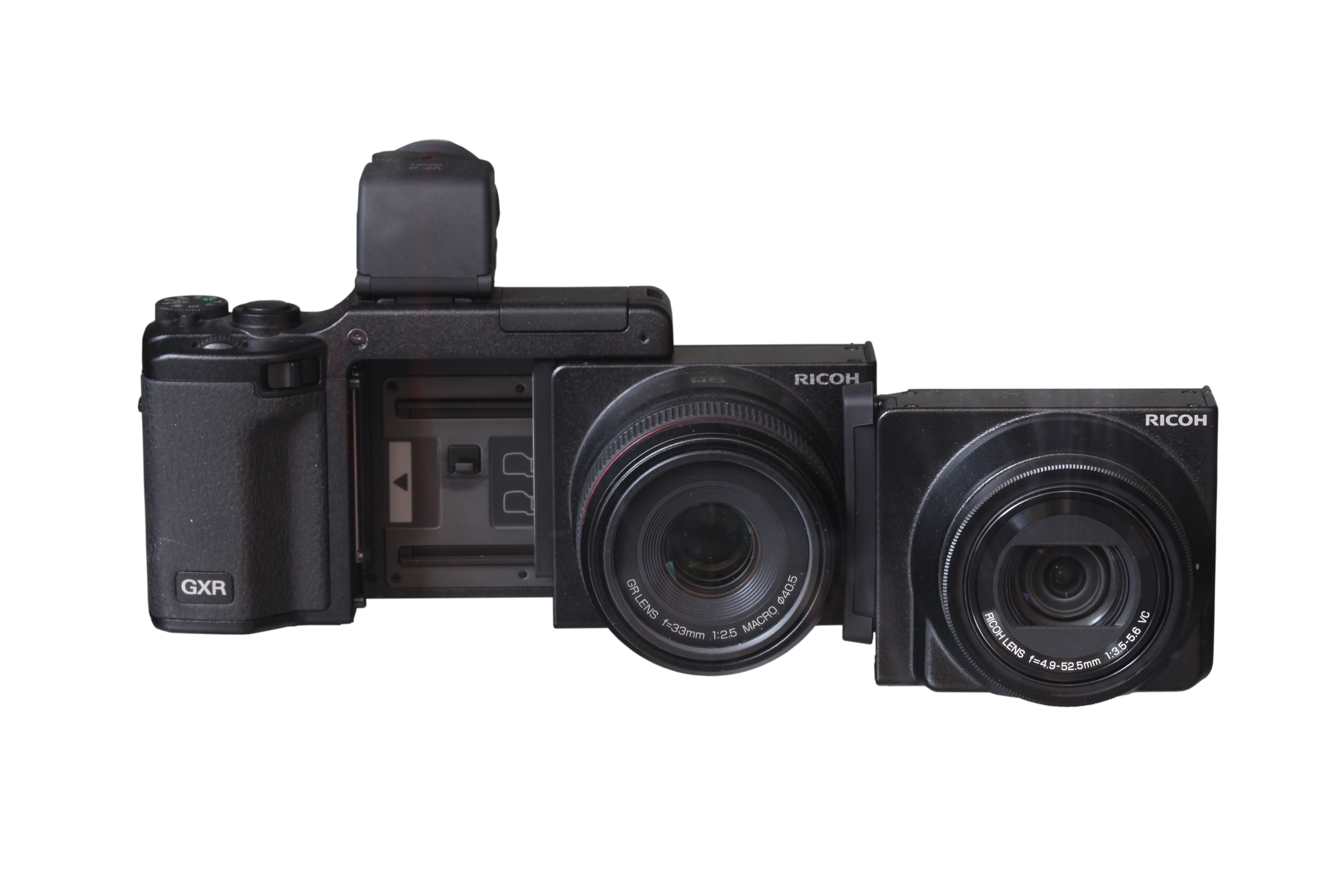
Ricoh GXR

The Ricoh GXR (November 2009) had a radically different design. The mirrorless camera featured interchangeable lens units – a sealed unit of a lens and sensor, instead of the lens only being interchangeable. This design was different from other mirrorless cameras, and received mixed reviews, primarily due to its higher cost.

=== 2010s: Pocket mirrorless cameras ===
Following the introduction of the Micro Four Thirds system, several other cameras were released by Panasonic and Olympus, with the Olympus PEN E-P1 (announced June 2009) being the first mirrorless camera in a compact size (pocketable with a small lens). The Samsung NX10 (announced January 2010) was the first camera in this class not using the Micro Four Thirds system, instead utilizing a new, proprietary lens mount (Samsung NX-mount). The Sony Alpha NEX-3 and NEX-5 (announced May 14, 2010, and released in July 2010) saw Sony enter the market with a new, proprietary lens mount (the Sony E-mount), though the camera included LA-EA1 and LA-EA2 adapters for the legacy Minolta A-mount.

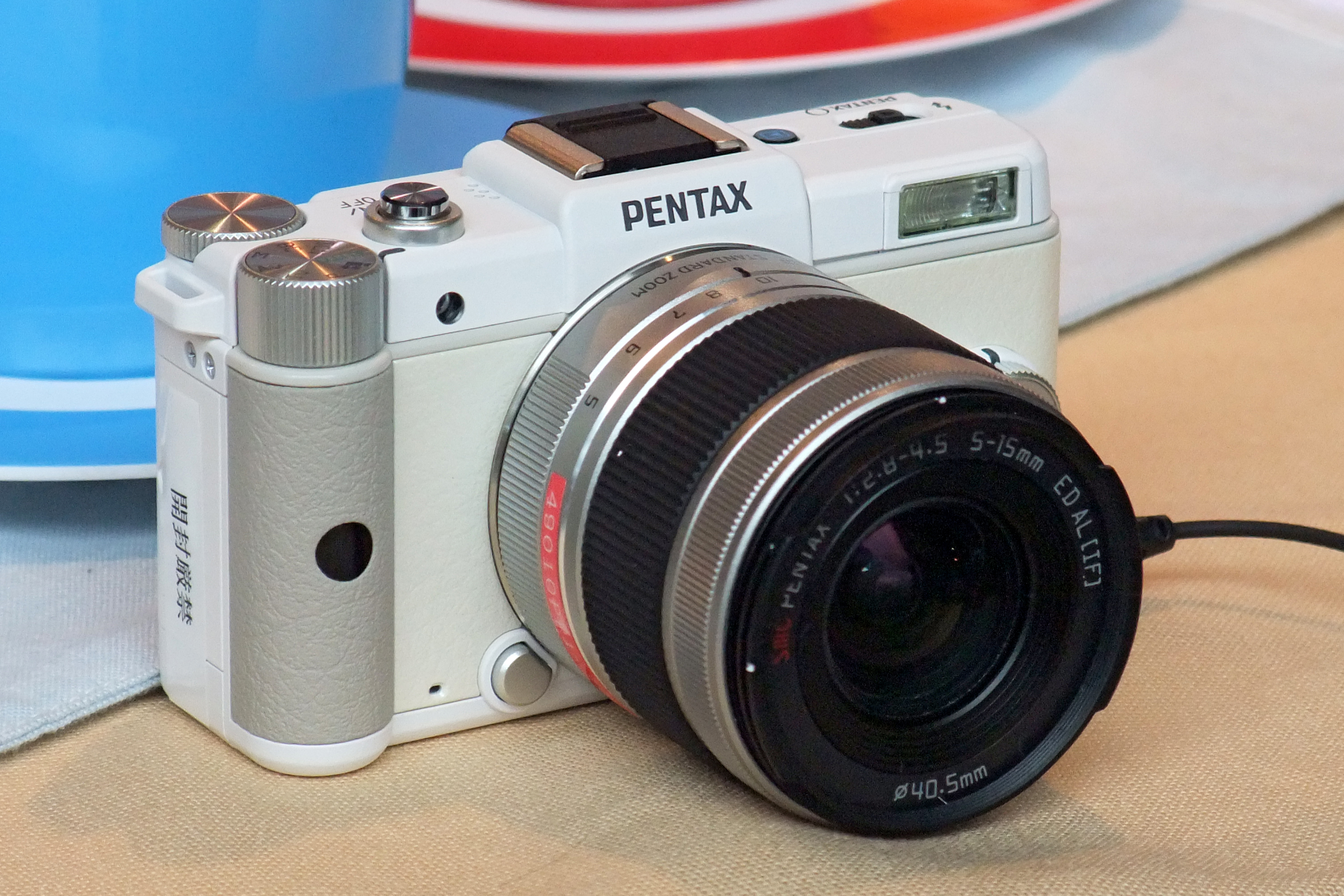
Pentax Q

In June 2011, Pentax announced the 'Q' mirrorless interchangeable lens camera and the 'Q-mount' lens system. The original Q series featured a smaller 1/2.3 inch 12.4 megapixel CMOS sensor. The Q7, introduced in 2013, has a slightly larger 1/1.7 inch CMOS sensor with the same megapixel count.

In September 2011, Nikon announced their Nikon 1 system which consists of the Nikon 1 J1 and Nikon 1 V1 cameras and lenses. The V1 features an electronic viewfinder. The series includes high-speed mirrorless cameras which, according to Nikon, had the fastest autofocus and the fastest continuous shooting speed (60 fps) of any camera with interchangeable lenses, including DSLRs.

The Fujifilm X-Pro1, announced in January 2012, was the first non-rangefinder mirrorless with a built-in optical viewfinder. Its hybrid viewfinder overlaid electronic information, including shifting frame-lines, to compensate for the parallax effect. Its 2016 successor, the X-Pro2, had an updated version of this viewfinder.

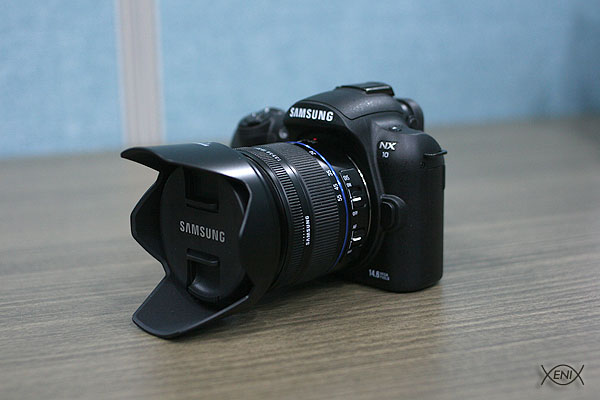
Samsung NX10

Beyond just consumer interest, mirrorless lens systems created significant interest from camera manufacturers as a possible alternative to high-end camera manufacturing. Mirrorless cameras have fewer moving parts than DSLRs, and are more electronic, which is an advantage to electronic manufacturers (such as Panasonic, and Samsung), while reducing the advantage that dedicated camera manufacturers have in precision mechanical engineering. Sony's entry level full frame mirrorless α7 II camera has a 24-megapixel 5-axis stabilised sensor, but is more compact and less expensive than any full-frame sensor DSLR.

Canon was the last of the major manufacturer of DSLRs to announce their own mirrorless camera, announcing the Canon EOS M in 2012 with an APS-C sensor and 18 mm registration distance similar to the one used by NEX.

In the longer term Olympus decided that mirrorless may replace DSLRs entirely in some categories; Olympus America's DSLR product manager speculated that by 2012, Olympus DSLRs (the Olympus E system) might become mirrorless, though still using the Four Thirds System (not Micro Four Thirds).

Panasonic UK's Lumix G product manager John Mitchell, speaking to the Press at the 2011 "Focus on Imaging" show in Birmingham, reported that Panasonic "G" camera market share was almost doubling each year, and that the UK Panasonic "G" captured over 11% of all interchangeable camera sales in the UK in 2010, and that the UK "CSC" sales made up 23% of the interchangeable lens market in the UK, and 40% in Japan.

Sony announced their 2011 sales statistics in September 2012, which showed that mirrorless lenses had 50% of the interchangeable lens market in Japan, 18% in Europe, and 23% worldwide. Since then, Nikon and others entered the mirrorless market.

Due to the downward trend of the world camera market, mirrorless camera sales suffered, but not as drastically and was compensated with increase by about 12 percent in the Japanese mirrorless camera market. However, mirrorless cameras took longer to catch on in Europe and North America. According to Japanese photo industry sources, mirrorless made up only 11.2% of interchangeable-lens cameras shipped to Europe in the first nine months of 2013, and 10.5% of those shipped to the U.S. in the same period. An industry researcher found that mirrorless camera sales in the U.S. fell by about 20% in the three weeks leading up to December 14, 2013—which included the key Black Friday shopping week; in the same period, DSLR sales went up 1%. Looking ahead, the APS-C sensor segment is projected to retain a substantial 47.2% share of mirrorless camera market.

In 2013, mirrorless system cameras constituted about five percent of total camera shipments. In 2015, they accounted for 26 percent of system camera sales outside of the Americas, and 16 percent within the United States. As of 2023, mirrorless cameras have come to overtake DSLRs as the dominant kind of interchangeable lens camera, with them gaining market share over DSLRs, and nearly all camera manufactures have switched entirely and exclusively to making mirrorless cameras and lenses.

Until the mid 2010s, mirrorless cameras were dismissed by many photographers, because of their laggy and low resolution screens, when compared with the clarity and responsiveness of the optical viewfinders used on DSLRs, especially under strong sunlight or when photographing the sky at night. In addition, mirrorless cameras were known for having worse autofocus performance compared to DSLRs, and much worse battery life. This negative perception of mirrorless cameras began to change around 2013, when the Sony α7 was released. It was the first professional, full-frame mirrorless camera, and, although not the first with depth aware autofocus, included small additional sensors on the main sensor to detect depth in the scene, for fast autofocus ("phase-detect").

2015 sales statistics showed that overall camera sales have fallen to one third of those of 2010, due to compact cameras being substituted by camera-capable mobile phones. Within camera sales, mirrorless ILCs have seen their market share increasing, with ILCs being 30% of overall camera sales, of which DSLRs were 77% and mirrorless cameras were 23%. In the Americas in 2015, DSLR annual sales fell by 16% per annum, while mirrorless sales over the same 12-month period have increased by 17%. In Japan, mirrorless cameras outsold DSLRs during some parts of the year. In 2015, mirrorless-cameras accounted for 26 percent of interchangeable-lens camera sales outside the Americas, although a lesser share of 26 percent was in the U.S.

In late 2016, Olympus announced their OM-D E-M1 Mark II camera, a successor to the earlier and successful Mark I. The Mark II model retains a Micro Four Thirds image sensor of 17.3x13 mm and features a 20.4 megapixel resolution sensor, representing a new generation of mirrorless cameras competitive with and in many respects superior to DSLR cameras.

=== Late 2010s: development of full-frame mirrorless ===
The late 2010s saw increased adoption of mirrorless designs on full frame cameras, with Sony, Nikon and Canon all releasing multiple high-end models. Sony's 2017 α7R3 and α9 featured more than 450 PDAF autofocus points, with the latter supporting continuous shooting at 20 frames per second. Nikon and Canon followed by releasing their first full frames in 2018, with both adopting a new lens mount designed for mirrorless systems: the Nikon Z6 and Z7 with the Z-mount, and the Canon EOS R with the RF mount.

At the NAB Show in April 2018, Blackmagic Design announced and demonstrated the Pocket Cinema Camera 4K at a price of $1,295 USD.

In early 2019, Canon announced their second full-frame mirrorless camera, the entry-level EOS RP, with Nikon announcing their first Z-mount camera with an APS-C sensor, the Nikon Z50, later in the year.

The 2019 a7R IV from Sony featured a 61 megapixel full-frame sensor, the highest-resolution of full-frame cameras at the time. In October 2019, Panasonic's Lumix S1H became the first hybrid full-frame mirrorless camera certified by Netflix for use in its Original productions. This became a giant milestone in the camera industry by showing that it is possible to have a camera that is highly compact and relatively affordable (compared to traditional cinema cameras) while still meeting the high standards of a professional camera for film making.

=== 2020s: Decline of DSLRs ===
In July 2020, Canon announced both the EOS R5 and R6 to bring more mirrorless cameras to their lineup. The EOS R5 was significant at the time as it was the first camera to be capable of 8K RAW video recording at up to 30 fps, positioning it as a leader in hybrid photo-video equipment. The EOS R6 was viewed as the affordable sibling, offering 20 MP stills, 4K 60 fps video, and 8 stops of image stabilization, appealing to enthusiasts and professionals alike.

Also in July 2020, Sony announced the a7S III, which was a much-anticipated camera as it was aimed at professionals, especially videographers, as it retained a focus on low-light performance and video features.

Throughout 2020, significant technical developments were made, including improved low-light shooting capabilities and the ability to record in 8K RAW. These developments introduced new features to both photography and videography.

The year 2021 marked a turning point for mirrorless cameras, as they surpassed DSLRs in shipments, accounting for over 67% of total camera sales. On January 26, 2021, Sony announced the Alpha 1 and it had set the benchmark as it competed with the Canon EOS R5, being able to shoot video in 8K at 30 fps and 4K at 120 fps modes, as well as showcasing a 9.44-million-dot OLED EVF with a 240 Hz refresh rate. The Alpha 1 aimed to unify both photography and videography at a professional level.

A day later, Fujifilm released the GFX 100s, featuring a smaller and lighter body holding a 102 MP medium-format sensor. This camera is compared to the original GFX 100 with 6 stops of in-body image stablization (IBIS) and 4K video recording at 30 fps.

Nikon, towards the end of the year in October, released the Z9, its flagship full frame mirrorless model. It featured Nikon's best autofocus performance with 3D tracking, 8K video, 60 fps RAW shooting as well as offered cutting-edge speed and reliability with its stacked CMOS sensor.

For the year 2021, Sony led the market with a 32% share, followed closely by Canon at 28.2%, reflecting the growing preference for compact, versatile, and professional-grade systems. These cameras catered to both photographers and filmmakers, pushing the boundaries of image quality, autofocus, and video capabilities. Notably, both Sony and Canon announced in 2021 that they would no longer release new DSLR models as they pivoted fully to mirrorless cameras.

Over time, hybrid cameras gained dominance as cameras like the Canon EOS R5 C and Fujifilm X-H2S catered to professionals going for high-resolution photo performance alongside 8K recording and internal ProRes capabilities. Additionally, the APS-C format had become a focus of innovation—cameras like the Canon EOS R7 and R10, alongside Fujifilm's X-H2S and X-H2, highlighted how APS-C cameras could offer professional-grade specs like high burst rates and advanced autofocus while remaining compact and more affordable than full-frame systems. These systems have leaned more on an emphasis on content creators such as vloggers and YouTubers.

In 2022, mirrorless systems continued to dominate the digital camera market, accounting for 69% of interchangeable lens camera shipments—a 31% increase from the previous year, as reported by Camera & Imaging Products Association (CIPA). This year also saw Nikon join Canon and Sony in ceasing development of new DSLR models.

Among the most impactful releases of the year were the Canon EOS R7 (June 2022), and the Sony FX30 (September 2022), both of which offer 4K video up to 60 fps but the FX30 to it further to 120 fps. The R7 featured one of the highest performing APS-C sensors of the year, with 32 megapixels only slightly surpassed by the Fujifilm X-T5 (November 2022) with 40 megapixels. The X-T5 was also a top performer in video quality with 6.2K at 30 fps and 7 stops of IBIS. Nikon's Z30 catered to content creators with its user-friendly video-centric design. The OM System OM-1 pushed the boundaries of Micro Four Thirds with a stacked BSI Live MOS sensor and up to 50 fps of continuous shooting, appealing to wildlife and action photographers.

In March 2022, the Panasonic Lumix BS1H earned Netflix approval, further highlighting the growing acceptance of mirrorless cameras in high-end filmmaking. Additionally, the Nikon Z9 was honored with the prestigious "Camera of the Year Award" and "Readers Award" at the Camera Grand Prix 2022, recognizing its groundbreaking performance and impact on the camera industry.

In 2023, according to CIPA, global shipments of mirrorless cameras reached approximately $17 billion in the first half of 2023, marking a 20% year-over-year increase and setting a record high for the third consecutive year.

In April 2023, Canon released the EOS R8, and it contains various autofocus capabilities for recognizing subjects and 4K video from a 6K capture at up to 60p. Nikon then released the Z8 in May 2023, which has the same CMOS sensor, 8K video, and 20–30 fps shooting rate modes as the Z9 in a smaller body. Meanwhile, Sony announced the a9 III in November 2023, the first modern mirrorless camera with a global shutter. The shutter allows for distortion-free motion capture by reading out each pixel of the image at the same time. The 24-megapixel CMOS full-frame shutter can also shoot at 120 frames per second, while being able to capture at shutter speeds as fast as 1/80000 second.

Regionally, China led the surge with a 44% increase in sales, followed by Japan at 30%, and Europe at 9%. This uptick is closely linked to the revival of international travel, with the United Nations World Tourism Organization reporting that the number of international travelers in the first quarter of 2023 more than doubled compared to the previous year, reaching about 80% of pre-pandemic levels.

In November 2024, Nikon refreshed its APS-C line with the announcement of the Z50II as a major upgrade of the Z50; it became the first APS-C camera to use the Expeed 7 processor introduced with the Z9.

As of 2025, over 85% of new interchangeable-lens cameras sold are mirrorless systems; additionally, all major camera and lens manufacturers—with the exception of Pentax—have discontinued their DSLR models and fully committed to mirrorless cameras. However, while mirrorless cameras have established clear dominance in new units shipped, millions of DSLRs still remain in active use among both professionals and hobbyists.

== Sensor size ==
A full-frame camera is a digital camera with a digital sensor having a size equivalent to 35 mm format (36 mm × 24 mm) film. Cameras that have a smaller sensor than full-frame (such as APS-C and Micro Four Thirds) differ in having a crop factor. Digital cameras with a larger sensor than full-frame are called medium format, named after medium format film cameras that use the 120 and 220 film formats (although their sensors are generally much smaller than the frame size of medium format film cameras).

Sony was the first to introduce a full-frame mirrorless camera, the α7, in 2013. It was followed by the Leica SL (Typ 601) in 2015.

Nikon (with the Z6 and Z7) and Canon (with the EOS R) each launched full-frame mirrorless cameras in September 2018. Panasonic and Sigma, under the L-Mount Alliance, announced that they would be using the Leica L-Mount for their own full-frame mirrorless cameras. Panasonic announced its S1R and S1 cameras, and Sigma announced a then-unnamed camera, later called the fp, all to be launched in 2019 along with lenses from Panasonic and Sigma.

== Systems comparison ==
System Lens mount	Crop factor / sensor size		Throat diameter	Flange focal distance	Stabilization	Focus system	Release date, system status
Canon EF‑M	1.6	APS-C (22×15 mm)	47 mm	18 mm	Lens-based	Hybrid autofocus (Phase and contrast detection)	October 2012; Discontinued in 2023
Canon RF	1.0	Full-frame	54 mm	20 mm	Lens-based (all), IBIS (depends on model)	Hybrid autofocus	September 2018
Canon RF	1.6	APS-C (R7, Rxx, Rxxx)	54 mm	20 mm	Lens-based (all), IBIS (depends on model)	Hybrid autofocus	May 2022
Fujifilm G‑mount	0.79	44×33 mm Medium format	65 mm	26.7 mm	Lens-based, IBIS (depends on model)	Hybrid autofocus on GFX100*; Contrast-detection autofocus on other models	January 2017
Fujifilm X‑mount	1.5	APS-C (24×16 mm)	44 mm	17.7 mm	Lens-based; X-H*, X-S*, X-T4, X-T5: Sensor-based (5-axis IBIS)	Hybrid autofocus on X-H*, X-S*, X-T*, X-Pro2 & up, X-E2 & up, X-A5 & up; Contrast-detection autofocus on other models	January 2012
Hasselblad XCD mount	0.79	44×33 mm Medium format	61 mm	20 mm	No	Contrast-detection autofocus	June 2016
Leica L‑mount	1.0	Full-frame	51.6 mm	20 mm	Lens-based; IBIS (depends on the model)	Hybrid autofocus	April 2014
Leica L‑mount	1.5	APS-C (Leica T*, CL)	51.6 mm	20 mm	Lens-based; IBIS (depends on the model)	Hybrid autofocus	April 2014
Leica M‑mount	1.0	Full-frame	44 mm	27.80 mm	No	No autofocus, rangefinder	September 2009 (Leica M9)
Leica M‑mount	1.3	APS-H (27×18 mm)	44 mm	27.80 mm	No	No autofocus, rangefinder	September 2006 (Leica M8)
Leica M‑mount	1.5	APS-C	44 mm	27.80 mm	No	No autofocus, rangefinder	March 2004 (Epson R‑D1)
Micro Four Thirds	2.0	17×13 mm 4/3-type	38 mm	20 mm	Lens-based, IBIS (depends on model)	Hybrid autofocus (newer models)	October 2008
Nikon 1‑mount	2.7	13×9 mm 1.0-type Nikon CX	40 mm	17 mm	Lens-based	Hybrid autofocus	October 2011; Discontinued in 2018
Nikon Z‑mount	1.0	Full-frame (Zx, Zf, ZR)	55 mm	16 mm	Simultaneous sensor- and lens-based stabilization	Hybrid autofocus	August 2018
Nikon Z‑mount	1.5	APS-C (Zxx, Zfc)	55 mm	16 mm	Lens-based	Hybrid autofocus	October 2019
Pentax Q‑mount	4.6	7.4×5.6 mm (1/1.7-type) (Q7, Q-S1)	38 mm	9.2 mm	Sensor-based	Contrast-detection autofocus	June 2011 (Pentax Q); Discontinued in 2017
Pentax Q‑mount	5.6	6.2×4.6 mm (1/2.3-type) (Q, Q10)	38 mm	9.2 mm	Sensor-based	Contrast-detection autofocus	June 2011 (Pentax Q); Discontinued in 2017
Samsung NX-mount	1.53	APS-C	42 mm	25.5 mm	Lens-based	Hybrid autofocus	January 2010; Discontinued in 2015/16
Samsung NX mini	2.7	1"	38 mm	6.95 mm	Lens-based	Hybrid autofocus	January 2010; Discontinued in 2015/16
Sigma SA‑mount	1.35	APS-H (Quattro H)	44 mm	44 mm	Lens-based	Hybrid autofocus	February 2016 (Sigma Quattro); Discontinued in 2018
Sigma SA‑mount	1.54	APS-C (Quattro)	44 mm	44 mm	Lens-based	Hybrid autofocus	February 2016 (Sigma Quattro); Discontinued in 2018
Sony E‑mount	1.0	Full-frame	46.1 mm	18 mm	Depends (lens-based and most models have IBIS and can use both at same time)	Hybrid autofocus (newer models)	October 2013
Sony E‑mount	1.5	APS-C (e.g. αxx00)	46.1 mm	18 mm	Depends (lens-based and most models have IBIS and can use both at same time)	Hybrid autofocus (newer models)	June 2010

== See also ==
- List of smallest mirrorless cameras
