= Crop factor =

Multiplier factor in digital imaging, compared to 35mm film camera focal length

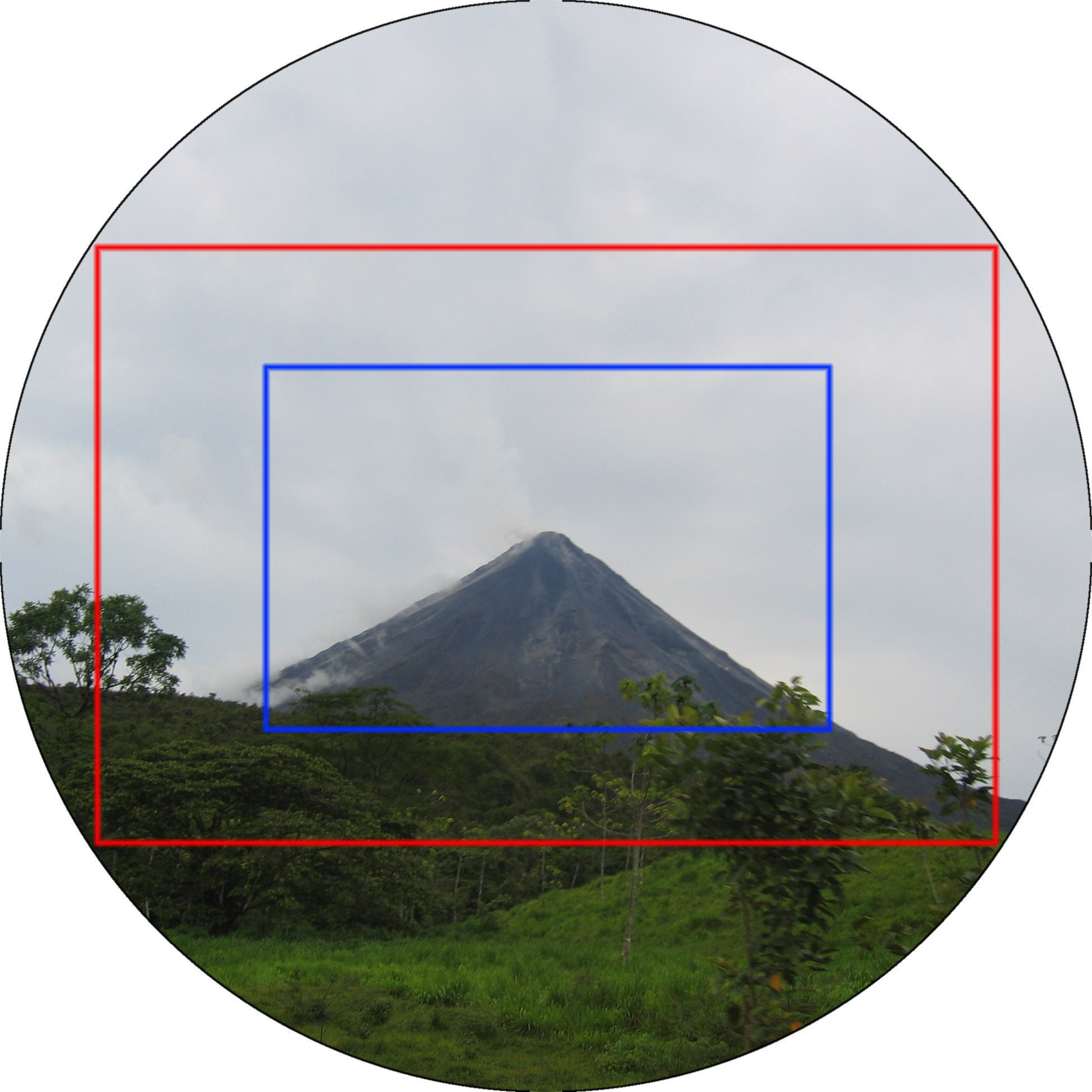
The outer, red box displays what a 24×36 mm sensor would see, the inner, blue box displays what a 15×23 mm sensor would see. (The actual image circle of most lenses designed for 35 mm SLR format would extend further beyond the red box than shown in the above image.)

In digital photography, the crop factor, format factor, or focal length multiplier of an image sensor format is the ratio of the dimensions of a camera's imaging area compared to a reference format; most often, this term is applied to digital cameras, relative to 35 mm film format as a reference. In the case of digital cameras, the imaging device would be a digital image sensor. The most commonly used definition of crop factor is the ratio of a 35 mm frame's diagonal (43.3 mm) to the diagonal of the image sensor in question; that is, $\text{CF} = \text{diag}_{35\text{mm}} / \text{diag}_{\text{sensor}}$. Given the same 3:2 aspect ratio as 35mm's 36 mm × 24 mm area, this is equivalent to the ratio of heights or ratio of widths; the ratio of sensor areas is the square of the crop factor.

The crop factor is sometimes used to compare the field of view and image quality of different cameras with the same lens. The crop factor is sometimes referred to as the focal length multiplier ("Film") since multiplying a lens focal length by the crop factor gives the focal length of a lens that would yield the same field of view if used on the reference format. For example, a lens with a 50 mm focal length on an imaging area with a crop factor of 1.6 with respect to the reference format (usually 35 mm) will yield the same field of view that a lens with an 80 mm focal length will yield on the reference format. (A lens with a higher focal length gives a narrower field of view at the same image sensor or film size, see Angle of view (photography).) If it is desired to capture an image with the same field of view and image quality but different cameras, the aperture and ISO settings also need to be adjusted with respect to the crop factor. The focal length of the lens does not change by using a smaller imaging area; the field of view is correspondingly smaller because a smaller area of the image circle cast by the lens is used by the smaller imaging area.

== Introduction ==
A 50 mm (focal length) lens on an APS-C image sensor format (crop factor 1.6) images a slightly smaller field of view than a 70 mm lens on a 35 mm sensor format camera (full frame sensor). An 80 mm lens (1.6 × 50 mm = 80 mm) with a full frame camera gives the same field of view as this 50 mm lens and APS-C sensor format combination produces.

The terms crop factor and FLM (Focal Length Multiplier) were coined to help 35 mm film format SLR photographers understand how their existing ranges of lenses would perform on newly introduced DSLR cameras which had sensors smaller than the 35 mm film format but often utilized existing 35 mm film format SLR lens mounts. (If the image sensor size in a digital camera is similar to the 35 mm film, then the sensor is called full frame sensor.) Using a DSLR with FLM of 1.5, for example, a photographer might say that a 50 mm lens on the DSLR "acts like" that its focal length has been multiplied by 1.5, which means that it has the same field of view as a 75 mm lens (75 mm = 50 mm × 1.5) on the film camera (with the 35 mm film format) that they are more familiar with. Of course, the actual focal length of a photographic lens is fixed by its optical construction and does not change with the format of the sensor that is put behind it.

Most DSLRs have nominally APS-C-sized image sensors, smaller than the standard 36 × 24 mm (35 mm) film frame. The result is that the image sensor captures image data from a smaller area than a 35 mm film SLR camera would, effectively cropping out the edges of the image that would be captured by the 36 mm × 24 mm 'full-size' film frame.

Because of this crop, the effective field of view (FOV) is reduced by a factor proportional to the ratio between the smaller sensor size and the 35 mm film format (reference) size.

For most DSLR cameras, this factor is 1.3–2.0×. For example, a 28 mm lens delivers a moderately wide-angle FOV on a 35 mm format full-frame camera, but on a camera with a 1.6 crop factor, an image made with the same lens will have the same field of view that a full-frame camera would make with a ~45 mm lens (28 × 1.6 = 44.8). This narrowing of the FOV is a disadvantage to photographers when a wide FOV is desired. Ultra-wide lens designs become merely wide; wide-angle lenses become 'normal'. However, the crop factor can be an advantage to photographers when a narrow FOV is desired. It allows photographers with long-focal-length lenses to fill the frame more easily when the subject is far away. A 300 mm lens on a camera with a 1.6 crop factor delivers images with the same FOV that a 35 mm film format camera would require a 480 mm long focus lens to capture. Canon, for example, describes its RF-S 18–45 mm zoom lens, used on cameras with a 1.6 crop factor, as giving a field of view equivalent to that of a 29–72 mm lens on a full-frame camera.

== Estimating sensor performance ==
For a given exposure, for example for a fixed focal-plane illuminance and exposure time, larger image sensors capture more photons and hence produce images with less image noise and greater dynamic range than smaller sensors. Due to the statistics of photon shot noise, the desirable properties of signal-to-noise ratio (SNR) and sensor unity gain both scale with the square root of pixel area.

Since crop factor is inversely proportional to the square root of sensor area (to within a small aspect ratio-dependent factor), it is useful for estimating image sensor performance. For example, if two different-sized image sensors have the same aspect ratio and a resolution of 10 megapixels, and are made using similar technology, the larger sensor will have better signal-to-noise ratio by a factor equal to the ratio of the two sensors' crop factors. The larger sensor has the smaller crop factor and the higher signal-to-noise ratio.

== Digital lenses ==
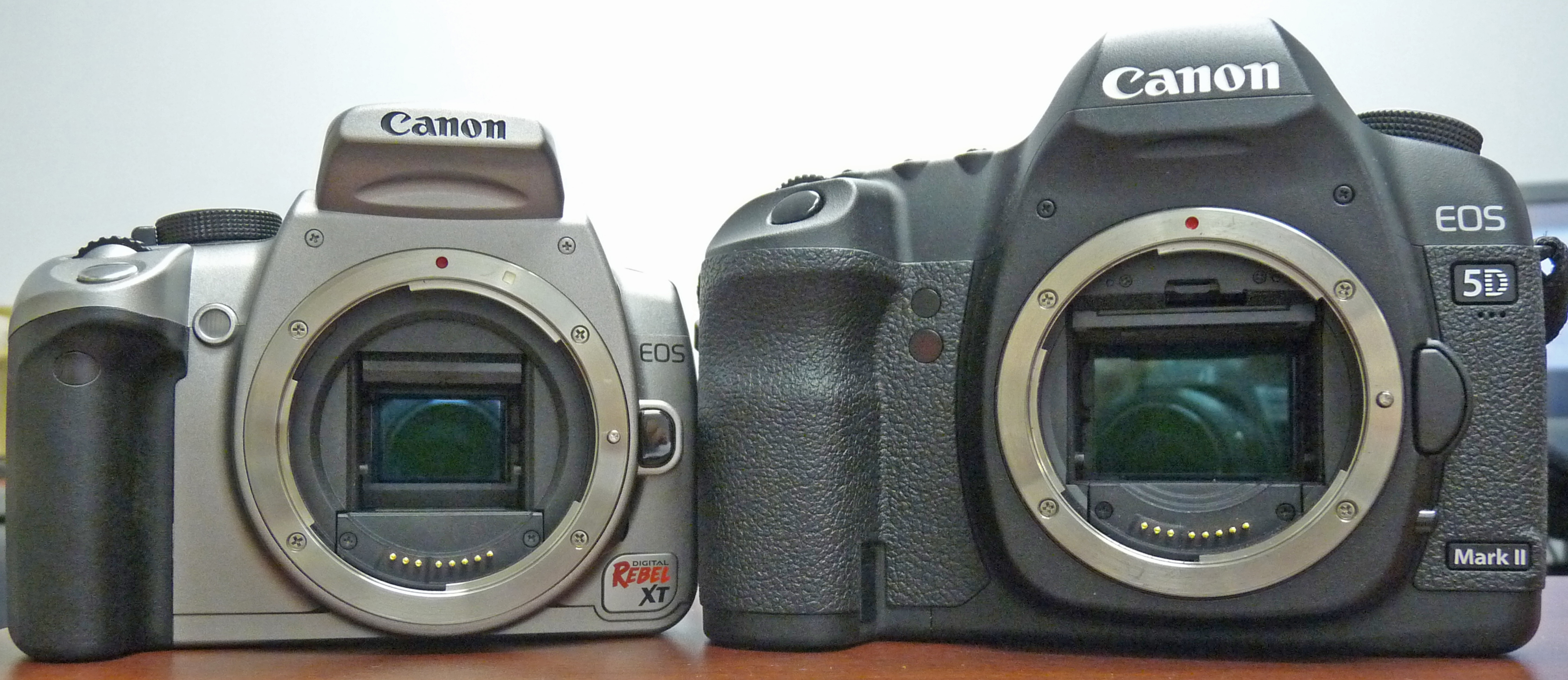
An APS-C format SLR (left) and a full-frame DSLR (right) show the difference in the size of the image sensors.

Most SLR camera and lens manufacturers have addressed the concerns of wide-angle lens users by designing lenses with shorter focal lengths, optimized for the DSLR formats. In most cases, these lenses are designed to cast a smaller image circle that would not cover a 24×36 mm frame but is large enough to cover the smaller 16×24 mm (or smaller) sensor in most DSLRs. Because they cast a smaller image circle, the lenses can be optimized to use less glass and are sometimes physically smaller and lighter than those designed for full-frame cameras.

Lenses designed for the smaller digital formats include Canon EF-S and EF-M lenses, Canon RF-S lenses (introduced in 2022 with the EOS R7 and EOS R10), Nikon DX lenses for both the F and Z mounts (the first Z-mount DX lenses were released with the Z 50 in 2019), Olympus Four Thirds System lenses, Sigma DC lenses, Tamron Di-II lenses, Pentax DA lenses, Fujifilm XF and XC lenses, and Sony Alpha (SAL) DT & E lenses. Such lenses usually project a smaller image circle than lenses that were designed for the full-frame 35 mm format. Nevertheless, the crop factor or FLM of a camera has the same effect on the relationship between field of view and focal length with these lenses as with any other lens, even though the projected image is not as severely "cropped". In this sense, the term crop factor sometimes has confusing implications; the alternative term "focal length multiplier" is sometimes used for this reason.

== Crop factor of point-and-shoot cameras ==
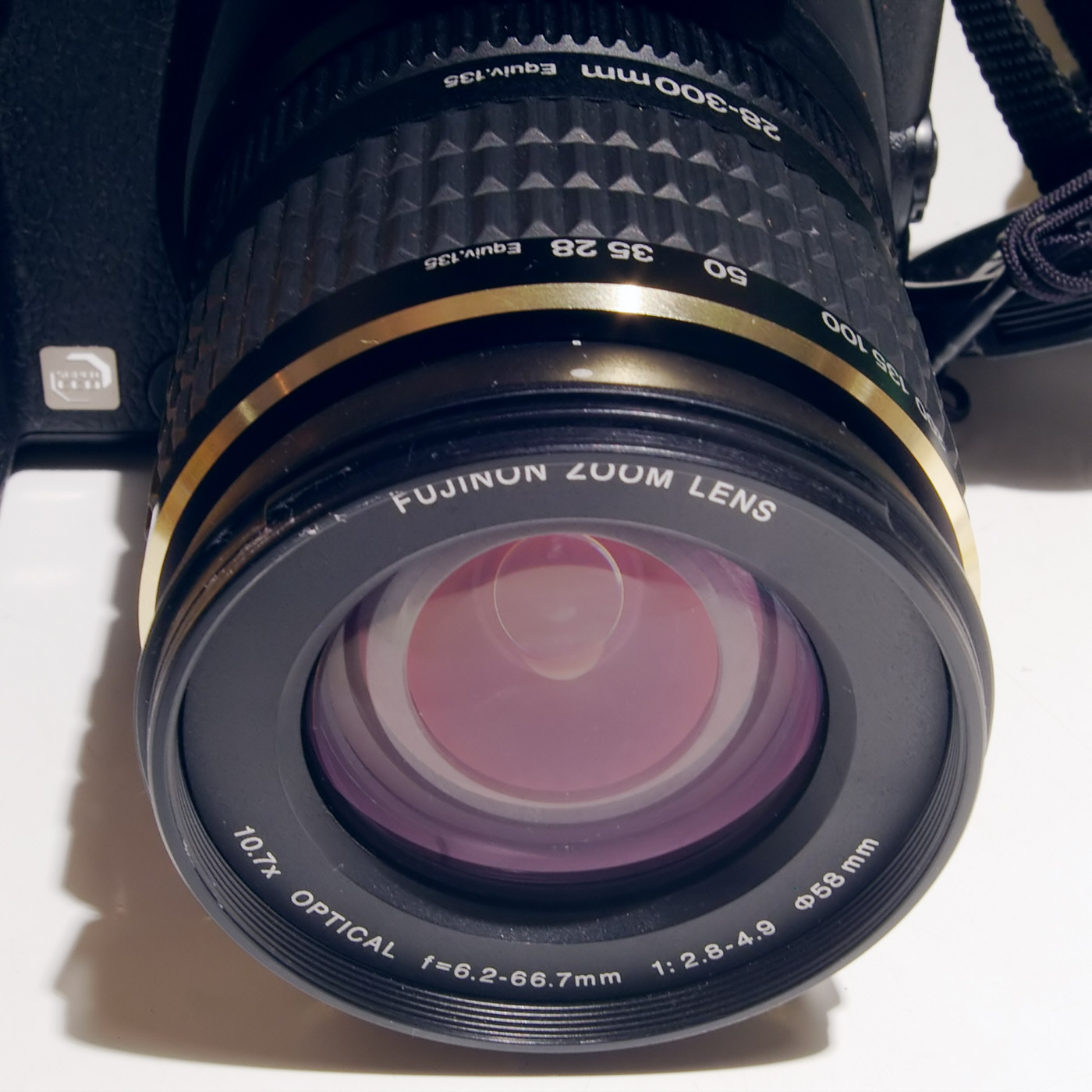
Some manufacturers provide both the real focal length and the 35 mm equivalent focal length

Smaller, non-DSLR, consumer cameras, typically referred to as point-and-shoot cameras, can also be characterized as having a crop factor or FLM relative to 35 mm format, even though they do not use interchangeable lenses or lenses designed for a different format. For example, the so-called "1/1.8-inch" format with a 9 mm sensor diagonal has a crop factor of almost 5 relative to the 43.3 mm diagonal of 35 mm film. Therefore, these cameras are equipped with lenses that are about one-fifth of the focal lengths that would be typical on a 35 mm point-and-shoot film camera. In most cases, manufacturers label their cameras and lenses with their actual focal lengths, but in some cases they have chosen to instead multiply by the crop factor (focal length multiplier) and label the 35 mm equivalent focal length. Reviewers also sometimes use the 35 mm-equivalent focal length as a way to characterize the field of view of a range of cameras in common terms.

For example, the Canon Powershot SD600 lens is labeled with its actual focal length range of 5.8–17.4 mm. But it is sometimes described in reviews as a 35–105 mm lens, since it has a crop factor of about 6 ("1/2.5-inch" format).

== Magnification factor ==
The crop factor is sometimes referred to as "magnification factor", "focal length factor" or "focal length multiplier". This usage reflects the observation that lenses of a given focal length seem to produce greater magnification on crop-factor cameras than they do on full-frame cameras. This is an advantage in, for example, bird photography, where photographers often strive to get the maximum "reach". A camera with a smaller sensor can be preferable to using a teleconverter, because the latter affects the f-number of the lens, and can therefore degrade the performance of the autofocus.

A given lens casts the same image no matter what camera it is attached to. The extra "magnification" occurs when the image is enlarged more to produce output (print or screen) that matches a standard output size. That is, the magnification, as usually defined from subject to focal plane, is unchanged, but the system magnification from subject to final output is increased.

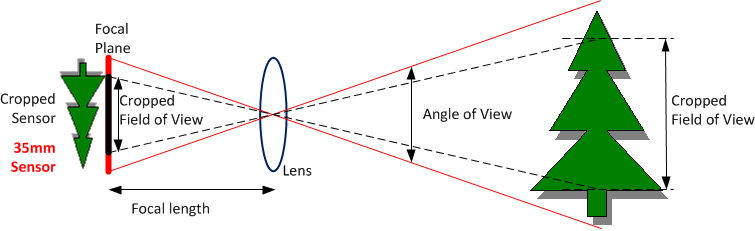
Field-of-view crop in cameras of different sensor size but the same lens focal length.

== Secondary effects ==
When a lens designed for 35 mm format is used on a smaller-format DSLR, besides the obvious reduction in field of view, there may be secondary effects on depth of field, perspective, camera-motion blur, and other photographic parameters.

The depth of field may change, depending on what conditions are compared. Shooting from the same position, with the same lens and same f-number as a non-cropped (full-frame) 35 mm camera, but enlarging the image to a given reference size, will yield a reduced depth of field. On the other hand, using a different lens with the same field of view as the non-cropped camera (matching the 35 mm-equivalent focal length), at same f-number, the smaller camera's depth of field is greater.

Perspective is a property that depends only on viewpoint (camera position). But if moving a lens to a smaller-format camera causes a photographer to move further from the subject, then the perspective will be affected.

The extra amount of enlargement required with smaller-format cameras increases the blur due to defocus, and also increases the blur due to camera motion (shake). As a result, the focal length that can be reliably hand-held at a given shutter speed for a sharp image is reduced by the crop factor. The old rule of thumb that shutter speed should be at least equal to focal length (in millimetres) for hand-holding will work equivalently if the actual focal length is multiplied by the FLM first before applying the rule.

Many photographic lenses produce a better image in the center of the frame than around the edges. When using a lens designed to expose a 35 mm film frame with a smaller-format sensor, only the central "sweet spot" of the image is used; a lens that is unacceptably soft or dark around the edges can give better results on a smaller sensor. However, since the image projected onto the sensor must be magnified more to make a print using a smaller sensor, lenses used on smaller formats must deliver a higher-resolution image to the sensor for acceptable quality and the smaller sensor must have higher SNR in order to compensate the reduced amount of light captured by the lens actually hitting on the sensor.

== Common crop factors ==
Crop factor figures are useful in calculating 35 mm equivalent focal length and 35 mm equivalent magnification. Some common crop factors are:

Comparison of camera sensor formats
Type	Sensor size	Crop factor		
Type	Sensor size	Height	Width	Diag.
1/2.5" (many superzoom and point-and-shoot cameras)	5.76×4.29 mm (0.227×0.169 in)	5.6×	6.3×	6×
1/2.3" (compacts and compact superzooms, earlier Pentax Q)	6.17×4.55 mm (0.243×0.179 in)	5.3×	5.8×	5.6×
1/1.8" (high-end compacts like Canon Powershot G1 - G7/S90)	7.18×5.32 mm (0.283×0.209 in)	4.5×	5×	4.8×
1/1.7" (high-end compacts, later Pentax Q)	7.6×5.7 mm (0.30×0.22 in)	4.2×	4.7×	4.6×
2/3" (Fujifilm X10, Fujifilm X20, Sony F828, Sony F717)	8.8×6.6 mm (0.35×0.26 in)	3.6×	4.1×	3.9×
1" (Nikon 1/CX / Sony RX100-series / Sony RX10 / Canon Powershot G7 X)	13.2×8.8 mm (0.52×0.35 in)	2.7×	2.7×	2.7×
4/3" / Four Thirds (used by Olympus and Panasonic for DSLR and MILC respectively)	17.3×13.0 mm (0.68×0.51 in)	1.8×	2.1×	2×
Sigma Foveon X3 (prior to Merrill cameras)	20.7×13.8 mm (0.81×0.54 in)	1.7×	1.7×	1.7×
Canon APS-C	22.2×14.8 mm (0.87×0.58 in)	1.6×	1.6×	1.6×
General APS-C (Sigma Foveon X3, Fujifilm X-mount, Nikon DX, Pentax K, Ricoh GXR, & Ricoh GR, Samsung NX, Minolta/Sony α DT & E-Mount (NEX))	23.7×15.6 mm (0.93×0.61 in)	1.5×	1.5×	1.5×
APS-H (Canon, Leica M8)	27.9×18.6 mm (1.10×0.73 in)	1.3×	1.3×	1.3×
35mm full frame (Canon EF, Leica M9, Nikon FX, Pentax K-1, Sony α, FE-Mount, Sony RX1)	36×24 mm (1.42×0.94 in)	1.0×		
Medium format (Hasselblad, Leaf, Phase One, Pentax 645D, Fujifilm GFX)	43.8×32.9 mm (1.72×1.30 in)	0.73×	0.82×	0.79×
Medium format (Hasselblad, Leaf, Phase One)	53.9×40.4 mm (2.12×1.59 in)	0.59×	0.67×	0.64×
Medium format (645)	43×56 mm (1.7×2.2 in)	0.43×	0.84×	0.61×
Medium format (6×6)	56×56 mm (2.2×2.2 in)	0.43×	0.64×	0.55×
Medium format (6×7)	68.5×56 mm (2.70×2.20 in)	0.43×	0.53×	0.49×
Medium format (6×9)	84×56 mm (3.3×2.2 in)	0.43×	0.43×	0.43×

== See also ==
- 35 mm equivalent focal length
- Angle of view
- Field of view
- Image sensor format
- Lenses for SLR and DSLR cameras
