= Shallow focus =

Photographic technique

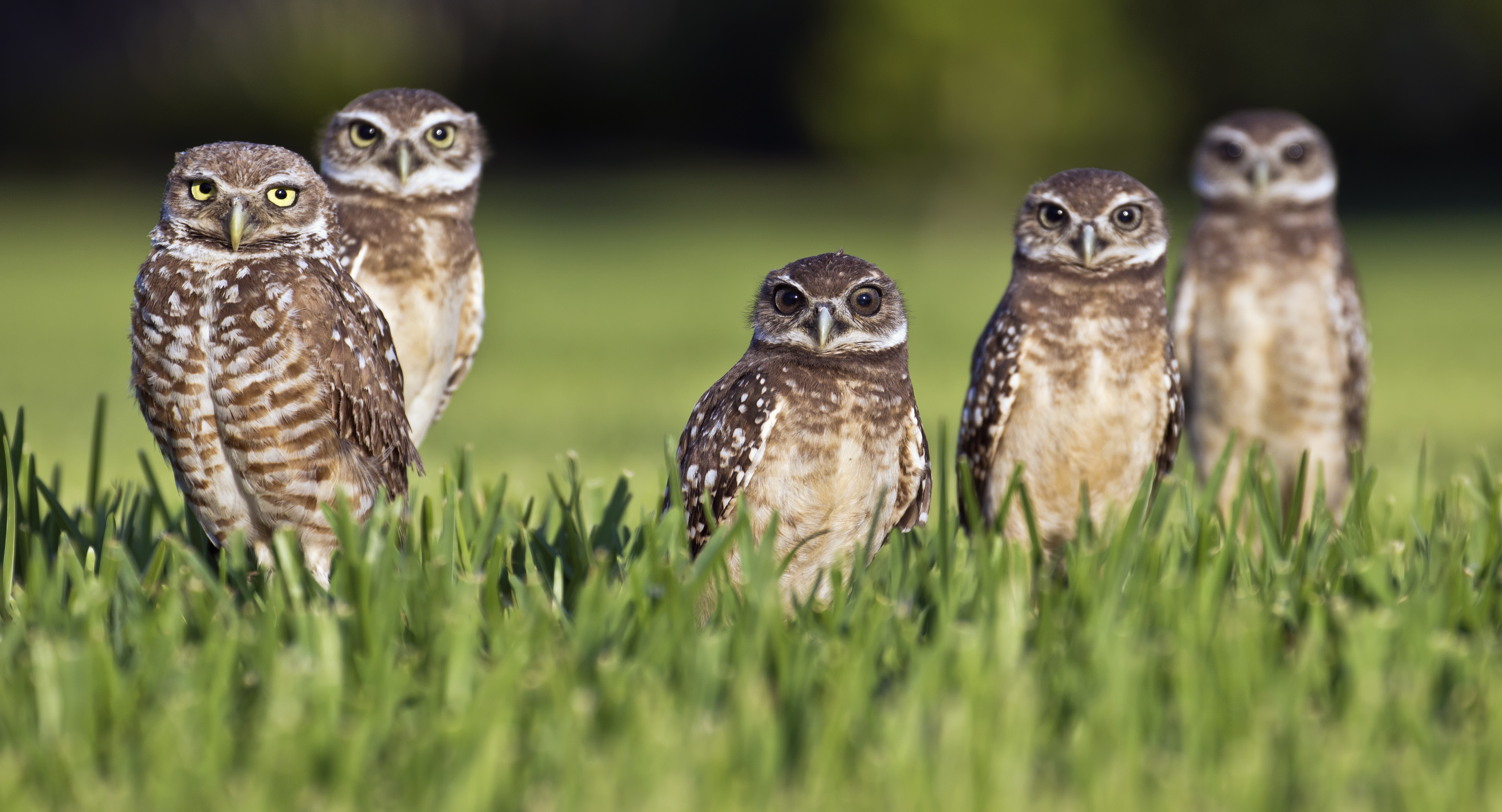
A group of burrowing owls. The leftmost and central owls are inside the plane of focus, the rightmost is outside the plane of focus, and the other two are intermediate.

Shallow focus is a photographic and cinematographic technique incorporating a small depth of field. In shallow focus, one plane of the scene is in focus while the rest is out of focus. Shallow focus is typically used to emphasize one part of the image over another. Photographers sometimes refer to the aesthetic quality of the unfocused area(s) as bokeh.

The opposite of shallow focus is deep focus, in which the entire image is in focus.

== Overview ==
Shallow focus has become more popular in the 2000s and 2010s. It is also a means by which low budget filmmakers use to hide places that would require expensive props. It is often proclaimed by some to being a way to avoid the "video look." Extremely shallow focus – sometimes called bokeh porn – made its debut in cinematography in 2008 with the release of the Canon EOS 5D Mark II and the start of DSLR cinematography.

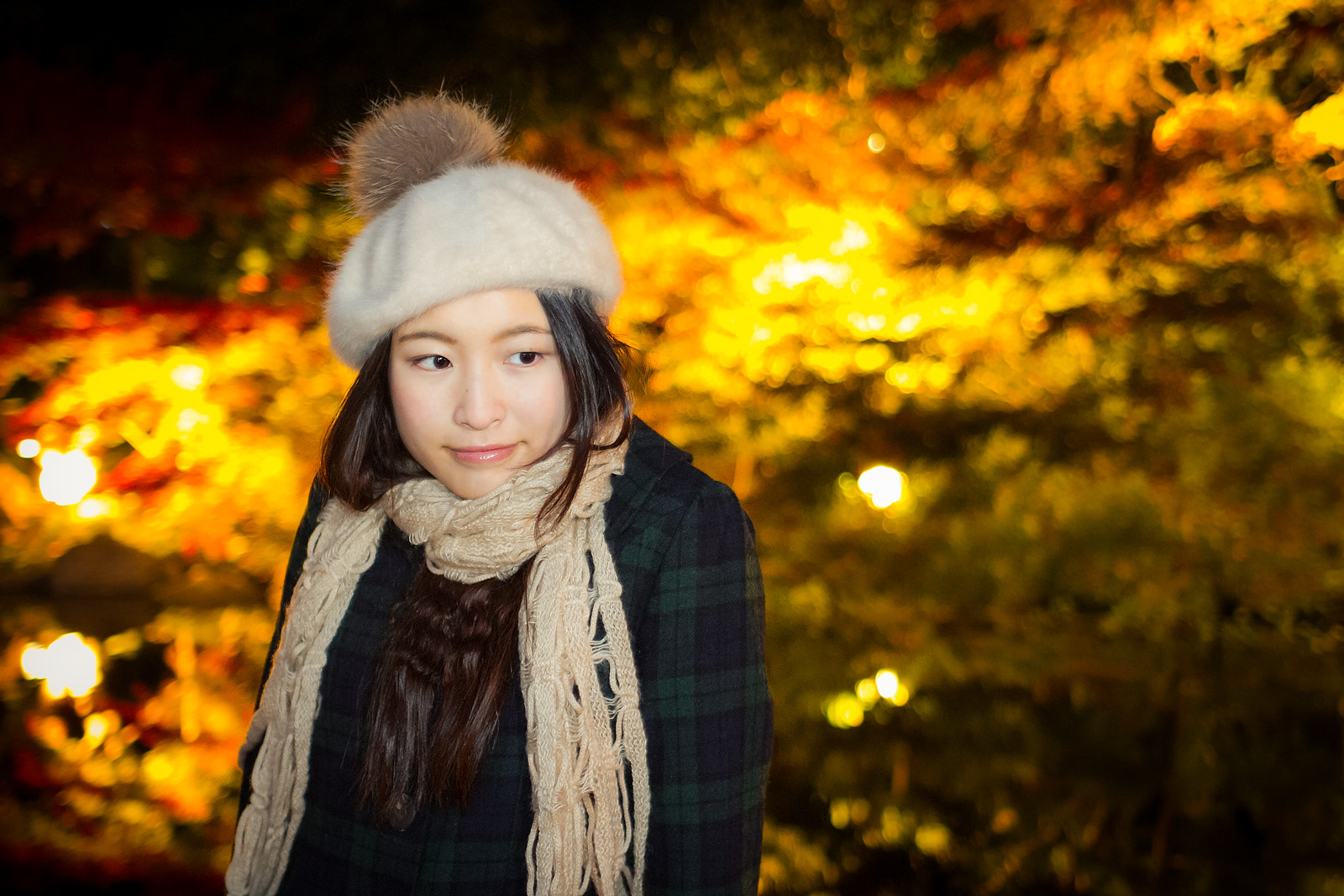
Autumn illumination in Tokugawa Garden, Japan. A wide aperture of f/1.8 allows the background to be out of focus.

== Details ==
The effect can be obtained by a larger aperture, a close viewpoint, a larger image sensor or a longer focal length lens from a smaller distance. A tilt lens can be used, in the opposite way to that used to increase depth of focus.

There are even adapters that allow lenses from 35 mm cine cameras to be used on smaller film and digital formats.

== Examples ==
In the film The Rules of the Game (1939), a couple flirts in the foreground while the woman's husband enters in the background. Director Jean Renoir chose to keep the husband out of focus so that his presence is hinted, but not emphasized.

== See also ==
- Bokeh
- Depth of field
- Portrait
