= Nikon I =

Nikon I may refer to:

== People ==
- Nikon I (Serbian patriarch)
- Patriarch Nikon of Moscow

== Nikon cameras ==
- Nikon I (camera)
- Nikon 1 series, a line of Nikon cameras built around the Nikon 1-mount
