= Nikon mount =

Nikon mount may refer to:

- Nikon 1-mount, a mirrorless digital camera lens mount since 2011
- Nikon F-mount, a 35mm film and digital SLR lens mount since 1959
- Nikon S-mount, a 35mm film rangefinder lens mount between 1948 and 2005
- Nikon Z-mount, a mirrorless digital camera lens mount since 2018

== See also ==
- Kodak F-mount
- Fujifilm F-mount
