= S2 =

S2 or S II may refer to:

== Science and technology ==
- S2 (star), a star in the Milky Way galaxy
- S/2007 S 2, a natural satellite of Saturn
- S2 impact (ie, "Spherules 2"), major impact of early Earth
- S2 map projection, a map projection created at Google
- S2 steel (shock resisting steel)
- S2: Keep out of the reach of children, a safety phrase in chemistry
- Disulfur (S_{2}), an allotrope of sulfur
- Sulfide (S^{2−}) anion

=== Mathematics ===
- S^{2}, the two-dimensional n-sphere
- S_{2}, the permutation group on two elements
- s^{2}, the variance of a variable

=== Biology and medicine ===
- British NVC community S2, a swamps and tall-herb fens community in the British National Vegetation Classification system
- Schneider 2 cells, or S2 cells, a commonly used Drosophila cell line
- Secondary somatosensory cortex, a brain area in the parietal cortex
- Sacral spinal nerve 2, a spinal nerve of the sacral segment
- Schedule 2, an Australian legal category assigned to drugs; See Standard for the Uniform Scheduling of Medicines and Poisons
- S2, the second sacral vertebrae
- S_{2} (heart sound), a sound in cardiac auscultation
- ATC code S02 Otologicals, a subgroup of the Anatomical Therapeutic Chemical Classification System

=== Computing ===
- S2 (programming language)
- S2 Spreadsheet, by IBM in 1984

== Transportation ==
=== Cars ===
- AS S2, a 1927 car manufactured in Poland
- Audi S2, a turbo-charged sports car
- Lotus Elise S2, a Lotus Elise production series of roadster automobile
- Porsche 944 S2, a 3l naturally aspirated Porsche 944 sports car

=== Roads and bus routes ===
- County Route S2 (California)
- Expressway S2 (Poland), a southern bypass of Warsaw
- S2 National Highway, one of the National Highways of Pakistan
- S2 expressway (Shanghai), an expressway in Shanghai also known as the Hulu Expressway
- S2, an abbreviation for a standard single carriageway road, with a single lane going in each direction
- Stagecoach Gold bus route S2, a bus route in Oxfordshire, England

=== Aviation and space ===
- Bangladesh (aircraft registration code)
- JetLite (IATA airline code)
- Focke-Wulf S 2, a 1928 German trainer aircraft
- Grumman S-2 Tracker, a 1952 United States Navy anti-submarine warfare (ASW) aircraft
- SABCA S-2, a 1926 Belgian aircraft
- Short S.2, a Short Brothers aircraft
- Strojnik S-2, motorglider
- S-II or S-2, the second stage of the Saturn V rocket

=== Rail ===
==== Locomotives ====
- Alco S-2, a locomotive
- Pennsylvania Railroad class S2, a unique steam turbine locomotive
- NER Class S2, a class of British steam locomotives

==== Passenger services ====
- S2 (Berlin), an S-Bahn service
- S2 (Dresden), an S-Bahn service
- S2 (Munich), an S-Bahn service
- S2 (Nuremberg), an S-Bahn service
- S2 (RER Vaud), an S-Bahn service in Switzerland
- S2 (Rhine-Main S-Bahn), an S-Bahn service
- S2 (Rhine-Ruhr S-Bahn), an S-Bahn service
- S2 (St. Gallen S-Bahn), an S-Bahn line in Switzerland
- S2 (ZVV), a service of the Zurich S-Bahn in Switzerland
- S2, a Breisgau S-Bahn service in Germany
- S2, a planned Bremen S-Bahn service in Germany
- S2, a Carinthia S-Bahn service in Austria
- S2, a Chur S-Bahn service in Switzerland
- S2, a Hamburg S-Bahn service in Germany
- S2, a Hanover S-Bahn service in Germany
- S2, a RheinNeckar S-Bahn service in Germany
- S2, a Rostock S-Bahn service in Germany
- S2, a Salzburg S-Bahn service in Austria
- S2, a Stuttgart S-Bahn service in Germany
- S2, a Stadtbahn Karlsruhe service in Germany
- S2, a Tyrol S-Bahn service in Austria and Italy (South Tyrol)
- S2, an Upper Austria S-Bahn service in Austria
- S2, a Vienna S-Bahn service in Austria
- S2, a Vorarlberg S-Bahn service in Austria, Liechtenstein and Switzerland
- Line S2 (BCR), a commuter rail service in Beijing, Chian
- Line S2 (Milan suburban railway service), Italy
- Line S2 (Nanjing Metro), a suburban rapid transit line currently under construction in China
- Line S2 (Wenzhou Rail Transit), a suburban rapid transit line currently under construction in China
- Line S2 (Wuxi Metro), China
- FGC line S2, a suburban train service in Barcelona Province, Spain

== Military ==
- Soviet submarine S-2, a Soviet World War II submarine
- Grumman S-2 Tracker, a US Navy aircraft
- Finnish torpedo boat S2, which sank in 1925
- USS S-2 (SS-106), a US Navy submarine
- Göta Signal Corps (designation S2), a 1944–1997 Swedish Army signal unit
- S2 (missile), the first deployed French land-based strategic missile
- S-2, a military intelligence officer on the staff of a regiment or battalion
- HMS Rorqual (S02), a 1956 British Royal Navy Porpoise-class submarine
- ORP S-2, Polish World War II motor gun boat

== Organisations ==
- S2 Records, a subsidiary of Sony Music
- S2 (TV channel), a former Scottish television channel
- S2 Games, a video game developer
- S2 Yachts, a defunct sailboat-building company

== Products ==
- Nintendo Switch 2, a hybrid video game console
- Samsung Galaxy S II, an Android smartphone
- Samsung Gear S2, a Tizen smartwatch
- Samsung Galaxy Tab S2, an Android tablet

=== Cameras ===
- Nikon S2, a 35mm rangefinder camera produced between 1954 and 1958 as part of the Nikon S-mount range
- Nikon 1 S2, a digital mirrorless interchangeable lens camera
- Canon PowerShot S2 IS, a 2005 5.0 megapixel digital camera
- FinePix S2 Pro, a 2002 interchangeable lens digital single-lens reflex camera by Fuji
- Leica S2, a 2009 37 million pixel medium format digital single-lens reflex camera

== Other uses ==
- Seremban 2, a suburb of Seremban, located in Negeri Sembilan, Malaysia
- S2, a version of the racing simulation Live for Speed
- S2, a district of the S postcode area, covering areas of eastern Sheffield
- Seattle Sounders FC 2, nicknamed S2
- Second year, in the Scottish education system
- S2 (classification), used for categorising swimmers based on their level of disability
- Silent Storm, a 2003 video game also known as S2: Silent Storm
- Splatoon 2, a 2017 video game for the Nintendo Switch
- Pitts Special, Two-Seat Aerobatics Biplane

== See also ==
- 2S (disambiguation)
