= Nikon S2 =

35 mm rangefinder camera

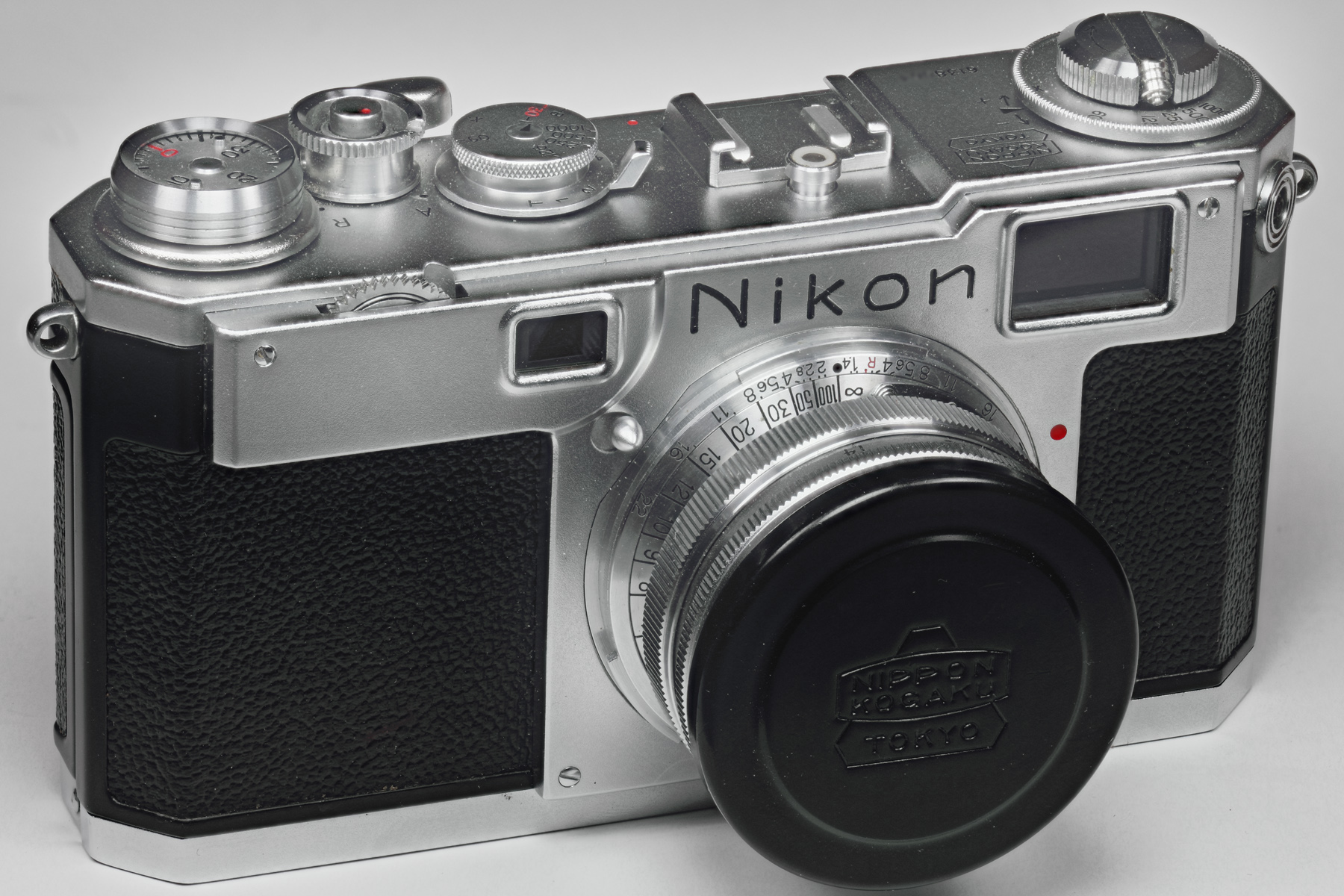
- Nikon S2 Rangefinder (Chrome Dial) with 5cm f-1.4 lens

Overview
- Maker: Nikon
- Type: 35 mm rangefinder camera
- Production: December 1954 through June 1958 (3 years 7 months)
- Intro price: $299.50 (with 50mm f/2) $345 (with 50mm f/1.4)

Lens
- Lens mount: Nikon 'S' bayonet mount
- Lens: interchangeable lens

Sensor/medium
- Film format: 35mm
- Film size: 36mm x 24mm
- Film advance: manual
- Film rewind: manual

Focusing
- Focus modes: Split and superposed-image rangefinder

Exposure/metering
- Exposure modes: Manual (M), and Bulb (B)
- Exposure metering: no integrated meter

Flash
- Flash: PC Sync
- Flash synchronization: 1/60s

Shutter
- Shutter: mechanically timed
- Shutter speed range: 1s to 1/1000s with Bulb and 1/60s flash-sync
- Continuous shooting: 1 FPS manual wind, 3 FPS S2E motordrive

Viewfinder
- Viewfinder: Etched frameline viewfinder
- Viewfinder magnification: 1x

General
- Battery: No
- Optional motor drives: S2E motordrive
- Dimensions: 136×73×42 mm (5.4×2.9×1.7 in)
- Weight: 530 g (19 oz)
- Made in: Japan

The Nikon S2 is a professional-level, interchangeable lens, 35 mm film, rangefinder camera introduced in 1954. It was manufactured by the Japanese optics company Nippon Kogaku K. K. (Nikon Corporation since 1988). It was the best-selling S-series camera, with nearly 60 thousand sold.

In mid-1955, the camera with 50mm f/2 lens sold for $299.50 (equivalent to $3,600 in 2025) and with the 50mm f/1.2 lens sold for $345 (equivalent to $4,146 in 2025).

Improvements over the Nikon S include:

- First Nikon camera to use a standard 24x36mm film format.
- First Nikon camera to be made available in black without special order
- First regular production camera that can be equipped with an electric motor drive.
- Easier to change the film, as it had a single bottom opening key.
- Film chamber had improved flare baffling
- A hot shoe was included, allowing the use of Nikon flash guns
- Easier film advance and rewind via a lever
- Faster maximum shutter speed of 1/1000 seconds (previous models only went to 1/500)

== Specifications ==
- Shutter = Horizontal running rubber coated fabric curtain-type focal plane shutter
- Shutter speeds = T, B and 1, 1/2, 1/4, 1/8, 1/15, 1/30, 1/60, 1/125, 1/250, 1/500, and 1/1000 seconds (regular interval graduation)
- Range marker = M inscription (XXINF - 0.9)
- Self-timer = Connect time variable system (the graduation of 3, 6 and 10 seconds it is attached)
- Pc socket = Time lag variable system, it aligns the synchronizer socket attachment and the speed light/write in 1/60 seconds less than
- Finder = Rangefinder type fixed 1x magnification finder (wide-angle finder for 28mm and 35mm finder)
- Framelines = 50mm
- Film wind = Film advance lever
- Film rewind = Film rewind crank
- Film = 135 Film (35mm film) with 36x24mm image size

== See also ==
- Nikon
- Nikon I, M and S
- Nikon S3
- Nikon SP
- Nikon S4

1948	1949	1950	1951	1952	1953	1954	1955	1956	1957	1958	1959	1960	1961	1962	1963	1964	1965	1966	1967
Nikon^{NF}																			
		M^{NF}																	
			S^{F}																
							S2^{F}												
										S3^{F}									
											SP^{F}								
											S4^{F}								
													S3M^{F}						
Specials		S3 2000 (2000); SP Limited Edition (2005)																	
