= Nikon S3 =

35 mm rangefinder camera

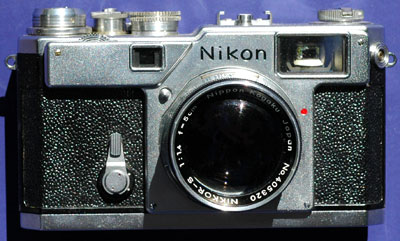

Overview
- Maker: Nikon
- Type: 35 mm rangefinder camera
- Intro price: $239 (with 50mm f/1.4)

Lens
- Lens mount: Nikon 'S' bayonet mount
- Lens: interchangeable lens

Sensor/medium
- Film format: 35mm
- Film size: 36mm x 24mm
- Film advance: manual
- Film rewind: manual

Focusing
- Focus modes: Split and superposed-image rangefinder

Exposure/metering
- Exposure modes: Manual (M), and Bulb (B)
- Exposure metering: no integrated meter

Flash
- Flash: PC Sync
- Flash synchronization: 1/60s

Shutter
- Shutter: mechanically timed
- Shutter speed range: 1s to 1/1000s with Bulb and 1/60s flash-sync
- Continuous shooting: 1 FPS manual wind, 3 FPS S-36 motordrive

Viewfinder
- Viewfinder: Etched frameline viewfinder
- Viewfinder magnification: 1x

General
- Optional motor drives: S-36 motordrive
- Dimensions: 136mm width×81mm height×43mm depth
- Weight: 590 g (21 oz)
- Made in: Japan

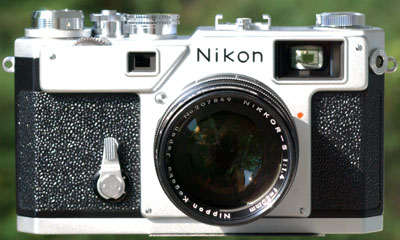
Nikon S3-2000 Millennium model

The Nikon S3 is a professional-level, interchangeable lens, 35 mm film, rangefinder camera introduced in 1958. It was manufactured by the Japanese optics company Nippon Kogaku K. K. (Nikon Corporation since 1988).

The S3 is mechanically similar to the Nikon SP except for a simplified viewfinder system. The viewfinder does not compensate for parallax error and the framelines are fixed (etched).

In 1958, the camera with 50mm f/1.4 lens sold for 86000 Yen ($239), equivalent to $2,667 in 2025.

== Nikon S3M ==
The S3M, derived from the original S3 full-frame camera, was custom modified in a very small production run as a half-frame model using a 18x24mm frame. This gave double the number of exposures per roll. It was produced from 1960–61.

== Nikon S3 2000 ==
In 2000, Nikon introduced an updated, hand-assembled S3 model to celebrate the new millennium, the S3 2000. It was quite a production to produce S3s again, as all the original dies were long gone. The new Nikkor 50mm f/1.4 lens for the new S3 is noticeably larger than original 50mm f/1.4 lenses.

== Specifications ==
- Shutter = Horizontal running rubber coated fabric curtain type focal plane shutter
- Shutter speeds = T, B and 1, 1/2, 1/4, 1/8, 1/15, 1/30, 1/60, 1/125, 1/250, 1/500 and 1/1000 seconds (regular interval graduation)
- Range marker = M inscription (XXINF - 0.9)
- Self-timer = Connect time variable system (the graduation of 3, 6 and 10 seconds it is attached)
- Pc socket = Time lag variable system, it aligns the synchronizer socket attachment and the speed light/write in 1/60 seconds less than
- Finder = Rangefinder type fixed 1x magnification finder (wide angle finder for 28mm and 35mm finder)
- Framelines = 35mm, 50mm, 105mm
- Film wind = Hand operated lever system, 136 degree revolution (multiple winds possible), with 15 degree extra withdrawal angles
- Film rewind = Manual Crank system
- Film = 135 Film (35mm film) with 36x24mm image size

== See also ==
- Nikon
- Nikon I, M and S
- Nikon S2
- Nikon SP
- Nikon S4

1948	1949	1950	1951	1952	1953	1954	1955	1956	1957	1958	1959	1960	1961	1962	1963	1964	1965	1966	1967
Nikon^{NF}																			
		M^{NF}																	
			S^{F}																
							S2^{F}												
										S3^{F}									
											SP^{F}								
											S4^{F}								
													S3M^{F}						
Specials		S3 2000 (2000); SP Limited Edition (2005)																	
