= Galina Kofman =

Russian-American computer programmer and executive

- Born: Soviet Union
- Known for: IBM Kerberos, IBM FTP and NTP, Executive
- Awards: two IBM CEO Outstanding Technical Achievement Awards, 1990 and 1992

Galina Kofman is a computer scientist and business executive. She was the author of the Kerberos protocol for various IBM systems. Kofman also authored FTP for IBM VM/CMS and OS/2. She received two IBM CEO Outstanding Technical Achievements awards and holds a patent on grid applications. Kofman is an executive at Recyclebank, a green company that rewards people for recycling.

== Career at IBM Research ==
While a researcher at Thomas Watson Research Center, Galina Kofman worked in the group of Barry Appelman, a significant Internet notable and the inventor of instant messaging. Kofman was active in Internet protocols development and specifically in TCP/IP since 1983 with her first project of RLSS, a remote login system that was a predecessor of Telnet at IBM. Appelman's group as a whole proved critical in IBM's early embrace of the Internet despite having a competing family of protocols, Systems Network Architecture. Kofman authored Kerberos for OS/2, VM/CMS and AIX. She also authored FTP client and server for VM/CMS and OS/2. Kofman also authored Network Time Protocol for various IBM operating systems. Kofman also was active in algorithms related to processing unstructured text. Kofman was the program manager and the main developer of IBM Magic system in 2006 According to Recyclebank press release, Galina Kofman received 2 IBM CEO Outstanding achievement awards, one in 1990 and another in 1992.

== Career after IBM ==
Galina Kofman is currently an executive at Recyclebank, a green company.
