= Nikon S-mount =

35mm lens mount

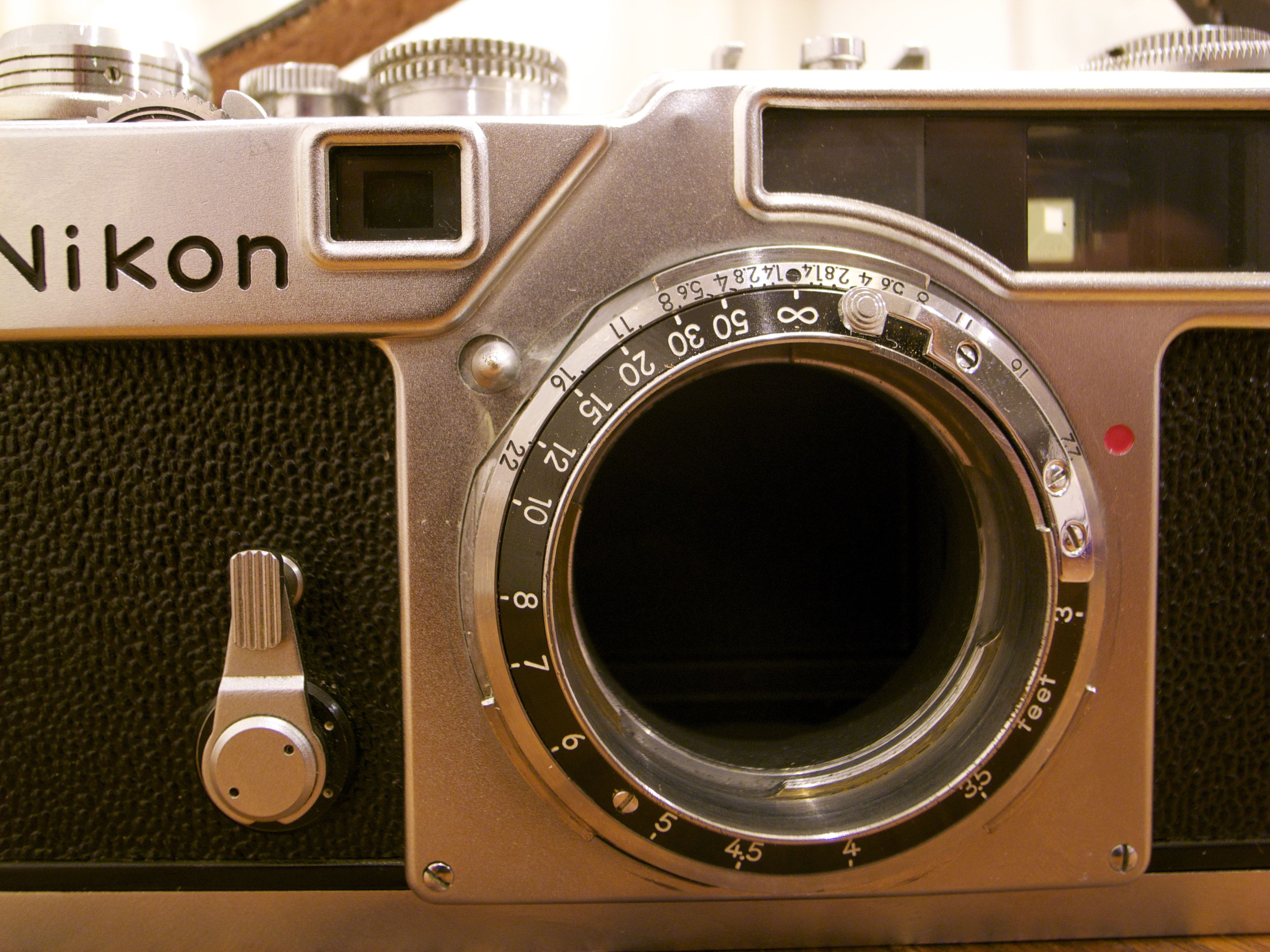
- The Nikon S-mount seen as part of the 1957 Nikon SP. The distance scale is for use with lenses using the internal bayonet.
- Type: Internal and external bayonet
- External diameter: 36.5 mm (internal bayonet) and 49 mm (external bayonet)
- Tabs: 3
- Flange: 34.85 mm
- Introduced: 1948
- Replaced: None - first Nikon interchangeable lens mount
- Discontinued: 1964

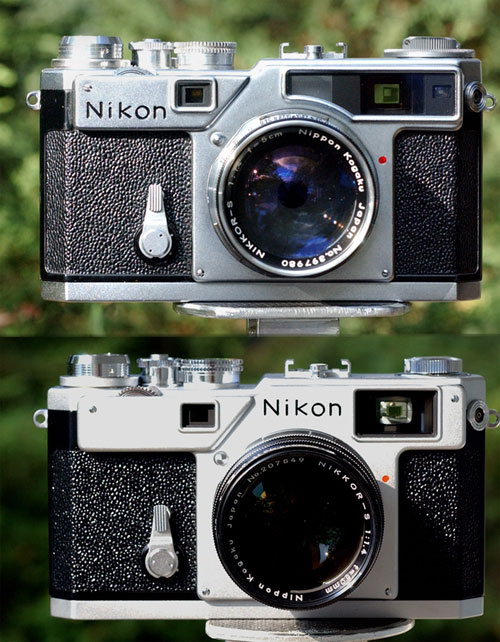
Nikon SP of 1957, above, and Nikon S3 of 1958, below

The Nikon S-mount is a type of interchangeable lens mount used by a series of Nikon 35 mm rangefinder cameras (Nikon I, Nikon M, Nikon S, Nikon S2, Nikon SP, Nikon S3, Nikon S4). The lenses were sold under the name Nikkor. S-mount lenses were produced from 1951 up to 1964.

== Technical details ==
The mount was a mechanical copy of the Zeiss Ikon Contax rangefinder mount; however, small differences between the two mean that although Zeiss wide-angle lenses can be used on the Nikon cameras and vice versa, the longer lenses (50 mm and above), if used, will not be able to focus at both close range and infinity.

Nikon made a small number of longer focal length lenses specifically designed to focus properly when mounted on a Contax. These were the 85 mm, 105 mm, and 135 mm lenses. Each was marked with a "C" on the side of the lens barrel. This is not to be confused with a "C" mark used as a suffix to the serial number, which on some early Nikkors was used to denote that the lenses were coated.

The mount itself has two bayonets (a dual-bayonet), one inside the camera and another outside. The body has a built-in focusing extension for lenses that use the inside bayonet, so these lenses do not need to have a focusing helicoid built into the lens barrel. As a consequence, the 5 cm f/1.4 lens that was normally sold with the body is extremely small (about the size of a golf ball) since the lens contains only the optics and aperture. Focusing of such lenses could be done by rotating the toothed wheel on the top front of the camera body or by rotating the lens barrel itself (the distance scale is on the camera body). The external bayonet is used to mount longer and heavier lenses where the built-in helicoid would not be strong enough to rotate the lens barrel. Such lenses are focused using a focusing ring and distance scale on the lens just like typical interchangeable lenses; the distance scale on the camera body is covered by the lens flange and thus is not visible when the external bayonet is in use.

== Cameras ==
From 1948 to 1968, Nikon produced eight camera bodies for the S-mount:

- Nikon I
- Nikon M
- Nikon S
- Nikon S2
- Nikon S3
- Nikon SP
- Nikon S4
- Nikon S3M

They later produced two commemorative models in the 2000s:

- Nikon S3 2000
- Nikon SP Limited Edition

== Lenses ==
Nikon produced a large range of Nikkor-branded lenses for these cameras with focal lengths ranging from 21 mm to 1000 mm. Several other manufacturers, including Fuji (now Fujifilm), Komura and Zunow, made S-mount lenses at the time, of which the Zunow 5 cm f/1.1 lens is a keenly sought-after collector's item. In 2002, Cosina Voigtländer manufactured a camera with an S-mount, the Bessa R2S, as well as several lenses for the Nikon S-mount.

In general, wide-angle Nikkor lenses with S-mount will mount directly to Contax bodies. The portrait lens (i.e., the 85 mm to 135 mm lenses) were sold with special Contax mounts. In addition, most of the lenses were available as optically identical versions with an M39 lens mount. The 135 mm f/3.5 lens was additionally available in a version with a Kine Exakta mount.

Nikkor S-mount lenses
Name (Note: The name is sometimes marked with a red ".C" suffix, designating the presence of lens coating.)	Basic statistics				Min. focus	Filter (mm) (Note: In the Filter column, "Ser." denotes a Series filter (non-threaded).)	Dimensions		Yr rls	Notes / Refs.
Name	FL (cm)	Aperture	Const.	I/E (Note: In the I/E column, identifies the bayonet used as Internal or External.)	Min. focus	Filter (mm)	Φ×L	Wt.	Yr rls	Notes / Refs.
Ultra wide angle lenses
Nikkor-O	2.1	f/4.0	8e/4g	E	91 cm (36 in)	43	55.8×53.5 mm (2.20×2.11 in)	127.5 g (4.50 oz)	1959	Biogon-type; final S-Mount lens.
Wide angle lenses
W-Nikkor	2.5	f/4–22	4e/4g	E	91 cm (36 in)	Ser.VII	55.8×31.8 mm (2.20×1.25 in)	126 g (4.4 oz)	1953	Topogon-type
W-Nikkor	2.8	f/3.5–22	6e/4g	E	91 cm (36 in)	43 or Ser.VII	55.8×32.4 mm (2.20×1.28 in)	145 g (5.1 oz)	1952	Orthometar-type
W-Nikkor	3.5	f/1.8–22	7e/5g	E	91 cm (36 in)	43	55.83×39.62 mm (2.198×1.560 in)	160 g (5.6 oz)	1956	Double Gauss-type;
W-Nikkor	3.5	f/2.5–22	6e/4g	E	91 cm (36 in)	43 or Ser.VII	55.79×35.10 mm (2.196×1.382 in)	111 g (3.9 oz)	1952	Double Gauss-type
W-Nikkor	3.5	f/3.5–22	4e/3g	E	91 cm (36 in)	43 or Ser.VII	55.8×32.4 mm (2.20×1.28 in)	190 g (6.7 oz)	1948	Tessar-type; early versions stopped down to f/16.
Stereo-Nikkor	3.5	f/3.5–22	4e/3g (×2)	I	91 cm (36 in)	43 or Ser.VII	?	198 g (7.0 oz)	1956	Stereoscopy lens capturing two half-frame (18×24 mm) images per frame.
Normal lenses
Nikkor-N	5	f/1.1–22	9e/6g	I/E	91 cm (36 in)	62	?	?	1956 (I); 1958 (E)	Double Gauss-type;
Nikkor-S	5	f/1.4–16	7e/3g	I	91 cm (36 in)	43 or Ser.VII	?	?	1950	
Nikkor-S	5	f/1.5–11	7e/3g	I	?	40.5	?	?	1950	Short production run
Nikkor-H	5	f/2–16	6e/3g	I	91 cm (36 in)	40.5 or Ser.VI	?	?	1946	Sonnar-type
Micro-Nikkor-P	5	f/3.5–22	5e/4g	I	91 cm (36 in)	34.5 or Ser.VI	?	?	1956	Xenotar-type; min. focus distance reduced to 45 cm (18 in) in extended position.
Nikkor-Q	5	f/3.5–22	4e/3g	I	?	?	?	?	1946	Tessar-type collapsible lens; short production run
Portrait lenses
Nikkor-S	8.5	f/1.5–32	7e/3g	E	107 cm (42 in)	Ser.VIII	70×64 mm (2.8×2.5 in)	564 g (19.9 oz)	1953	Long focus
Nikkor-P	8.5	f/2–32	5e/3g	E	107 cm (42 in)	48 or Ser.VII	?	?	1949	Long focus, Sonnar-type
Nikkor-P	10.5	f/2.5–32	5e/3g	E	120 cm (47 in)	52 or Ser.VII	?	?	1953	Sonnar-type
Nikkor-T	10.5	f/4	3e/3g	E	?	?	?	?	1958	Cooke triplet-type;
Nikkor-Q	13.5	f/3.5–32	4e/3g	E	150 cm (59 in)	43 or Ser.VII	?	?	1950	Early versions stopped down to f/16.
Nikkor-Q	13.5	f/4	4e/3g	E	?	40.5	?	?	1948	Tele-Sonnar-type
Nikkor-Q	13.5	f/4	4e/3g	E	?	43	?	?	1958	Tessar-type; short mount (no focusing helicoid) version
Telephoto lenses
Nikkor-H	18	f/2.5–32	6e/4g	E	2.1 m (6.9 ft)	Ser.IX	90×145 mm (3.5×5.7 in)	1.7 kg (3.7 lb)	1953	Uses prism reflex housing
Nikkor-Q	25	f/4–32	4e/3g	E	3 m (9.8 ft)	Ser.IX	79×133 mm (3.1×5.2 in)	915–1,024 g (2.0–2.3 lb) (Note: Weight depends on the specific production variant and mount version (such as the rangefinder preset or Zenza Bronica versions))	1951	Uses prism reflex housing
Nikkor-T	35	f/4.5–32	3e/3g	E	4 m (13 ft)	Ser.IX	95×300 mm (3.7×11.8 in)	1.7 kg (3.7 lb)	1958	Uses prism reflex housing
Nikkor-T	50	f/5–45	3e/3g	E	7.5 m (25 ft)	110	125×200 mm (4.9×7.9 in)	8.5 kg (19 lb)	1952	Uses prism reflex housing
Reflex-Nikkor	100	f/6.3	3e/2g	E	30 m (98 ft)	52 (Note: Lens featured integrated internal filter turrets/wheels)	125×220 mm (4.9×8.7 in)	9.9 kg (22 lb)	1959	Uses prism reflex housing

== See also ==
- Nikkor
- Nikon F-mount
- Nikon Z-mount
- Nikon 1-mount

1948	1949	1950	1951	1952	1953	1954	1955	1956	1957	1958	1959	1960	1961	1962	1963	1964	1965	1966	1967
Nikon^{NF}																			
		M^{NF}																	
			S^{F}																
							S2^{F}												
										S3^{F}									
											SP^{F}								
											S4^{F}								
													S3M^{F}						
Specials		S3 2000 (2000); SP Limited Edition (2005)																	
