= 2S =

2S or 2s may refer to:

== Science ==
- 2s electron in an atomic orbital
- 2S, a protein-folding intermediate with two disulphide bonds

== Transportation ==
- 2S gondola lift
- 2S, a series of Toyota S engines
- Birdman Chinook 2S, ultralight aircraft
- Southwind Airlines (IATA code), a Turkish airline

== Other uses ==
- Two-spirit, a term used by some indigenous North Americans to describe certain people in their communities who fulfill a traditional third-gender (or other gender-variant) ceremonial role in their cultures
- IIS, a draft status abbreviation for conscription into the United States armed forces

== See also ==
- 2 (disambiguation)
- S2 (disambiguation)
