= Barry Appelman =

American engineer

- Born: US
- Known for: Instant Messaging, TCP/IP
- Awards: IBM CEO Outstanding Technical Achievement Award

Barry Appelman is recognized as being the father of the "buddy list" and AOL instant messenger. Companies had been using crude forms of Instant messaging within their own networks for over forty years, but the idea of presence, i.e. who is logged on at any given time, was non existent. It was not until Appelman, and his colleagues at the Thomas Watson Research Center, first began to write programs on the mainframe system letting each other know when they were actually online, that modern day Instant Messaging was born.

In 1994 while employed at AOL, Appelman hired a single contract programmer, Stephen D. Williams, and for five months they worked together building a prototype system that allowed AOL subscribers to have an early form of the buddy list.

In 1995 AIM was launched internally to AOL employees. It was initially dubbed "the stalker feature" since many employees were uncomfortable having their co-workers know when they were online. AOL decided to make Appelman's system available to its subscribers in March 1996, then to other Internet users in May 1997. Ten years later, there were over 53 million AIM users worldwide.

== Career at AOL ==
Appelman joined AOL in 1993 to head up all of AOL server and host development efforts. He authored many innovations and patents: an instant messaging system, a highly scalable email system, ad servers, TCP/IP enabled browsers, among many others. Barry Appelman and his former colleagues from T.J. Watson, Matt Korn and Mike Connors who also came to AOL, were crucial to taking AOL from a distant third position in online services to that of a formidable leadership within 2–3 years.

== Career at IBM T.W. Watson Research ==
Barry Appelman led IBM's foray into TCP/IP at the Thomas Watson Research Center from 1984 until 1993. Appelman was able to turn complicated IBM politics to the advantage of TCP/IP, open systems and Internet standards. This was not an easy endeavor given that at the time IBM was pushing hard a competing family of internal protocols called Systems Network Architecture. In the end, the work of Barry Appelman proved critical to the IBM's adoption of TCP/IP and its early embrace of the Internet. Mr. Appelman and his group were active in the Internet standardization. Yakov Rekhter authored several Internet RFCs in routing protocols. Mr Appelman's team was also active in SNMP standardization.

Appelman's small team of developers produced TCP/IP stacks for all IBM operating systems. Dean Hiller authored MVS TCP/IP. Jay Elinsky authored TCP/IP for VM/CMS. Yakov Rekhter authored TCP/IP for AIX. Oleg Vishnepolsky authored TCP/IP for OS/2 and IBM POS terminals. Appelman was one of the first in the industry to recognize the importance of security in the world of open systems. He was the first one to make Kerberos security system out of MIT's Project Athena a commercial product by having Galina Kofman port this security software to various OS. Kofman also did FTP for VM/CMS. Dick Ryniker authored NFS for VM/CMS and MVS.

Appelman's innovation included offloading of TCP/IP processing from IBM mainframes to OS/2 servers, graphical TCP/IP clients, SNMP and FTP APIs, fastest terminal emulator MYTE, S2 Spreadsheet that connected via TCP to IBM DB2, and many others. Particularly noteworthy was the innovation by Appelman and one of his development managers Matt Korn to get voice and video flowing over IP back in 1987.

== Patents ==
Barry Appelman authored 77 patents.

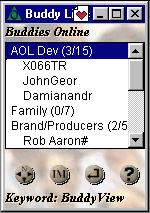
Original Buddylist view
