= S2 Spreadsheet =

- Original author: Oleg Vishnepolsky
- Developer: IBM
- Initial release: 1984; 42 years ago
- Type: spreadsheet

S2 Spreadsheet was a Lotus 1-2-3 compatible spreadsheet developed by IBM in 1984. It had all the features of Lotus 1-2-3, plus it had an ability to connect to IBM mainframes via TCP/IP and pull data from IBM databases such as IBM DB2 and IBM SQL/DS. It also had features that allowed for easy visual connection between formulas and their dependencies - those features were later adopted by Lotus 1-2-3 and Microsoft Excel. S2 was developed almost concurrently with Lotus development of 1-2-3, and matched 1-2-3 feature for feature. The S2 program was used throughout IBM in 1980s and 1990s. In 1986 it caused a legal controversy within IBM because of then current look-and-feel lawsuits between Lotus and other companies, and most importantly because IBM was negotiating a high-profile deal with Lotus to market Lotus 1-2-3.

According to a PC Week article of 1986 and a subsequent one in 2009, the sole author of this program was a developer in Thomas Watson Research Center, Oleg Vishnepolsky. Vishnepolsky developed this program unaware of the brewing deal between IBM and Lotus, and distributed it within IBM community to close to 50,000 users by the time of the controversy. A copy of his program ended up with a reporter of PC Week, who published an article speculating that IBM and Lotus' deal may be coming apart. That article caused a consternation within IBM executive quarters and attorneys.

IBM attorneys and executives in the end decided that the program does not violate the Lotus copyright. Given S2's wide adoption within IBM they decided not to withdraw it from use, and let Vishnepolsky to continue its development. Vishnepolsky however lost interest in further development of S2, moved to another project and later authored TCP/IP for OS/2 and IBM POS terminals. S2 spreadsheet got ported to OS/2 and AIX by other developers and remained in use through the 90s. Vishnepolsky reportedly said that instead of getting fired from IBM he received an outstanding technical achievement award from IBM CEO John Fellows Akers in 1992.

== See also ==
- Barry Appelman
- TCP/IP
