= Nikon S4 =

The Nikon S4 is a rangefinder camera produced by Nikon that was very similar to the Nikon S3 but had a slightly lower price. This was because it used a cloth shutter curtain (rather than titanium foil curtains) and it lacked the self-timer and motor drive lug of the S3. The viewfinder frame-line for 35mm lenses was also omitted. In all other respects, the cameras were identical.

The camera had a short production run of less than 6,000 units from 1958 to 1960 which makes it rare compared to the other Nikon rangefinders; however not as rare as the Nikon 1 or Nikon M models. The Nikon S4 was not exported to the United States.

== See also ==
- Nikon
- Nikon I, M and S
- Nikon SP

| 1948 | 1949 | 1950 | 1951 | 1952 | 1953 | 1954 | 1955 | 1956 | 1957 | 1958 | 1959 | 1960 | 1961 | 1962 | 1963 | 1964 | 1965 | 1966 | 1967 |
|---|---|---|---|---|---|---|---|---|---|---|---|---|---|---|---|---|---|---|---|
| Nikon^{NF} | | | | | | | | | | | | | | | | | | | |
| | | M^{NF} | | | | | | | | | | | | | | | | | |
| | | | S^{F} | | | | | | | | | | | | | | | | |
| | | | | | | | S2^{F} | | | | | | | | | | | | |
| | | | | | | | | | | S3^{F} | | | | | | | | | |
| | | | | | | | | | | | SP^{F} | | | | | | | | |
| | | | | | | | | | | | S4^{F} | | | | | | | | |
| | | | | | | | | | | | | | S3M^{F} | | | | | | |
| Specials | | S3 2000 (2000); SP Limited Edition (2005) | | | | | | | | | | | | | | | | | |
