= Nikkor =

Brand of lenses produced by Nikon

Nikkor ニッコール
- Product type: Camera lenses Industrial optics Enlarger lenses Microscope objectives
- Current owner: Nikon Corporation
- Country: Japan
- Introduced: 1932; 94 years ago
- Markets: Worldwide
- Website: www.nikkor.com

Nikkor is the brand of lenses produced by Nikon Corporation, including camera lenses for the Nikon F-mount and more recently, for the Nikon Z line of mirrorless cameras.

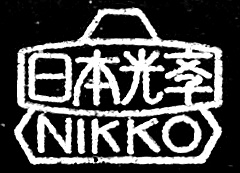
Nikko parent company brand, from which the Nikkor brand evolved.

The Nikkor brand was introduced in 1932, a Westernised rendering of an earlier version Nikkō (日光), an abbreviation of the company's original full name Nippon Kōgaku ("Japan Optics"; 日本光学工業株式会社). (Nikkō also means "sunlight" and is the name of a Japanese town.) In 1933, Nikon marketed its first camera lens under the Nikkor brand name, the "Aero-NIKKOR," for aerial photography.

Nikon originally reserved the Nikkor designation for its highest-quality imaging optics, but in recent history almost all Nikon lenses are so branded.

Notable Nikkor branded optics have included:

- F-mount lenses for 35mm SLR and DSLR photography (for a full list see Nikon F-mount).
- Z-mount lenses for Nikon mirrorless cameras.
- 1-mount lenses for Nikon 1 series cameras.
- S-mount lenses for the Nikon S-series rangefinder cameras.
- Lenses for Zenza Bronica and Plaubel Makina medium format cameras.
- Lenses for Leica rangefinder cameras, as well as very early Canon cameras.
- Amphibious lenses for Nikonos underwater cameras.
- Macro lenses under the Micro-Nikkor designation.
- Lenses for large format photography.
- EL-Nikkor photographic enlarger lenses.
- Microscope objectives.
- Industrial lenses, including lenses in support of the Japanese war effort during World War II.

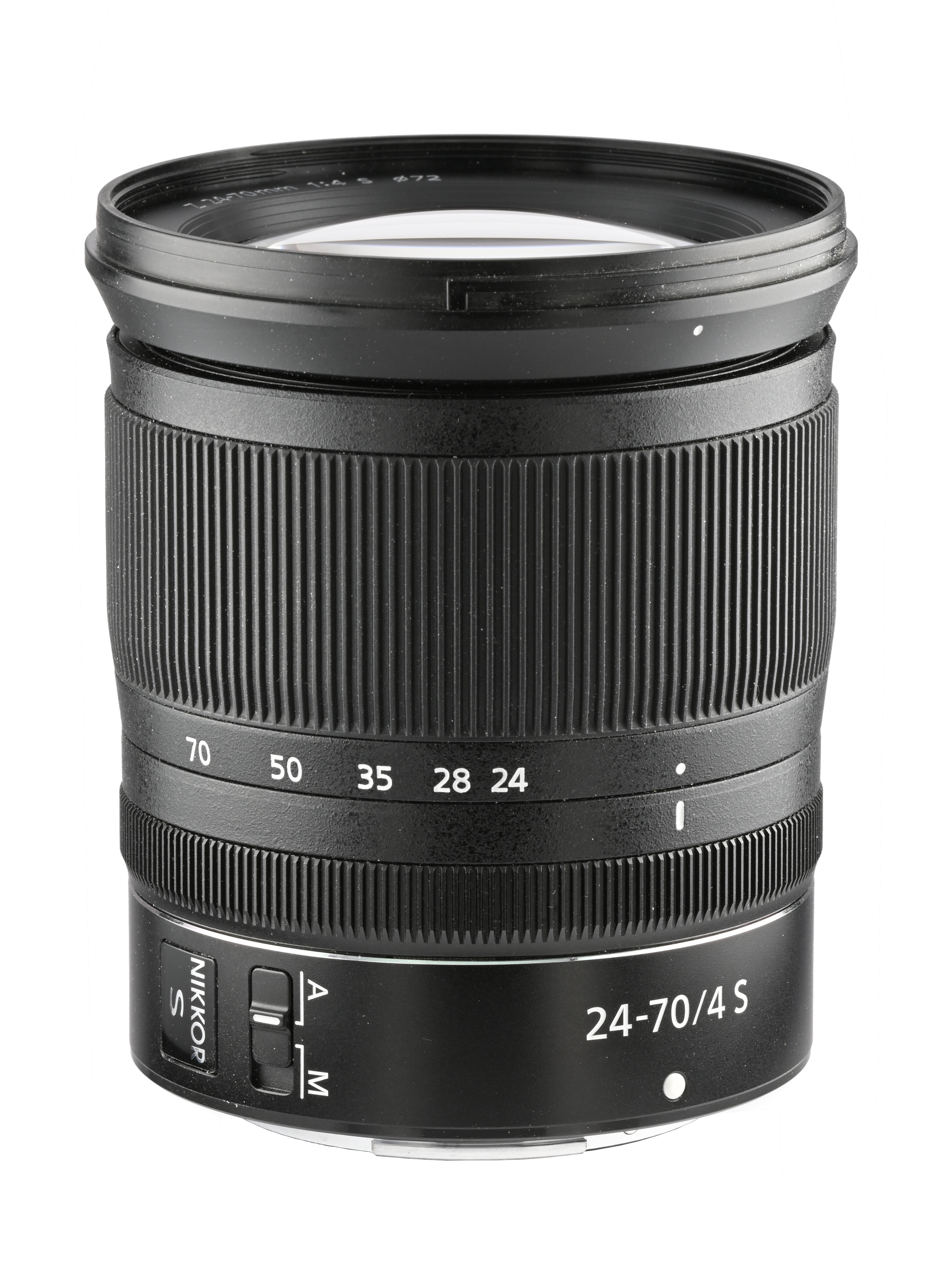
Nikkor Z 24-70 f/4 S lens

== Lenses for Nikon systems ==
=== Nikon Z-mount ===
Nikon introduced the Z-mount in 2018 for their system of digital full-frame (FX) and APS-C (DX) mirrorless cameras. All of Nikon's Z-mount lenses are Nikkors.

=== Nikon F-mount ===
Nikkors constitute the majority of lenses available for the Nikon F-mount, which is itself the largest system of interchangeable flange-mount photographic lenses in history. These lenses are designed for the 135 (35mm) and Nikon DX formats. Over 400 different F-mount Nikkor models are known to exist.

F-mount Nikkor lenses from various decades

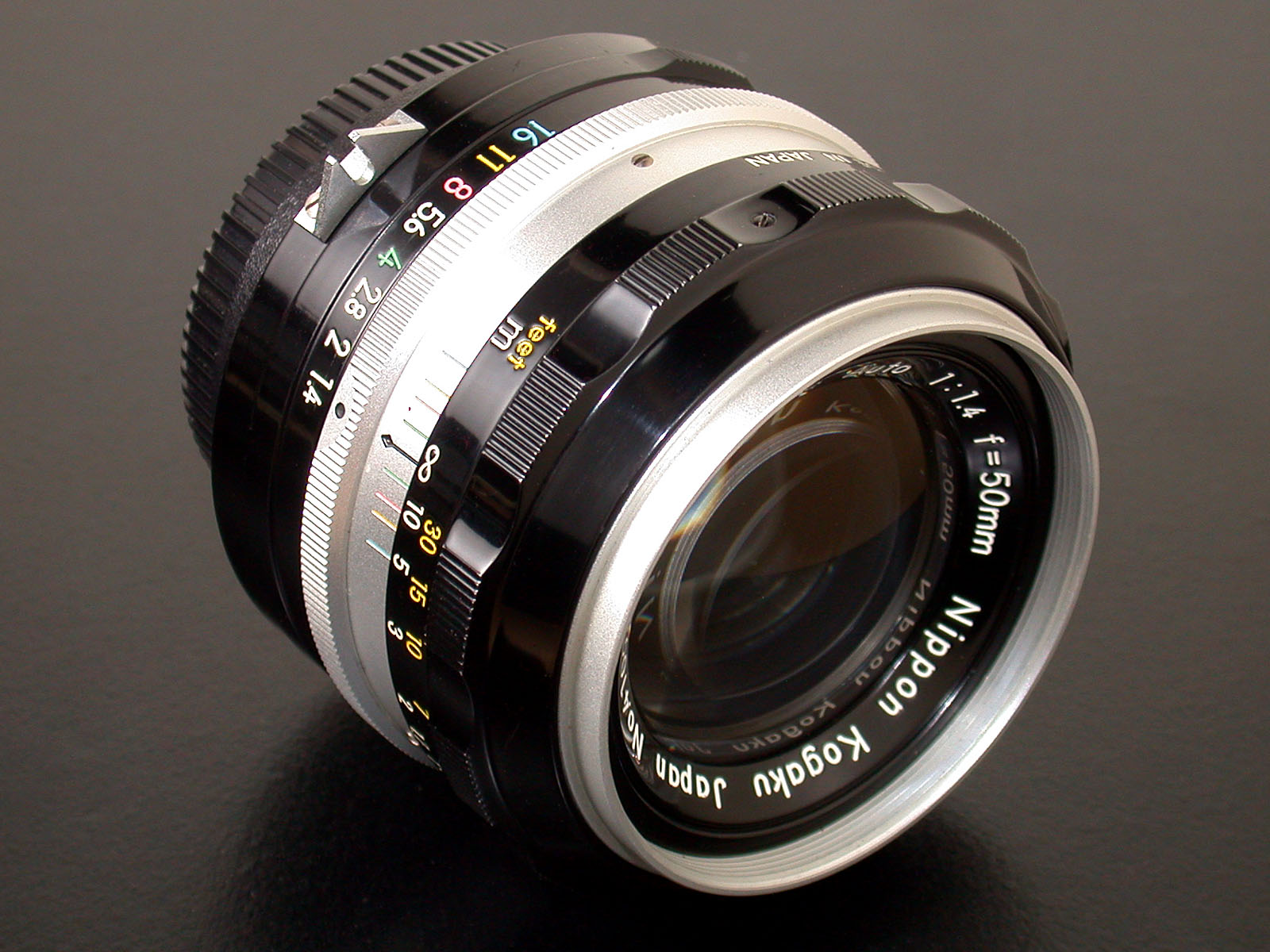
Pre-AI Nikkor-S 50 mm f/1.4
(A-type, 1960s to early 1970s)

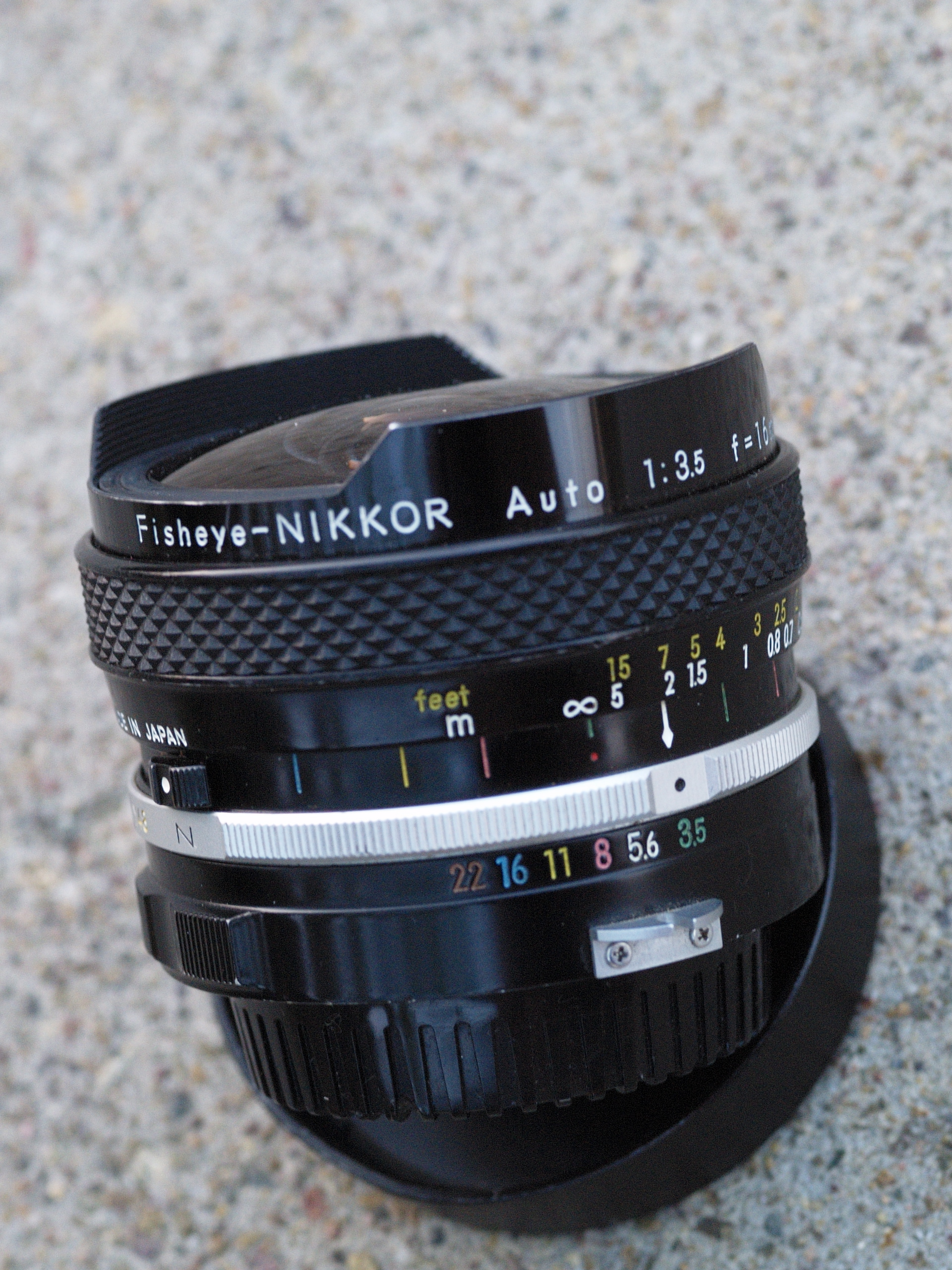
Pre-AI Fisheye-Nikkor 16 mm f/3.5
(K-type, early 1970s)

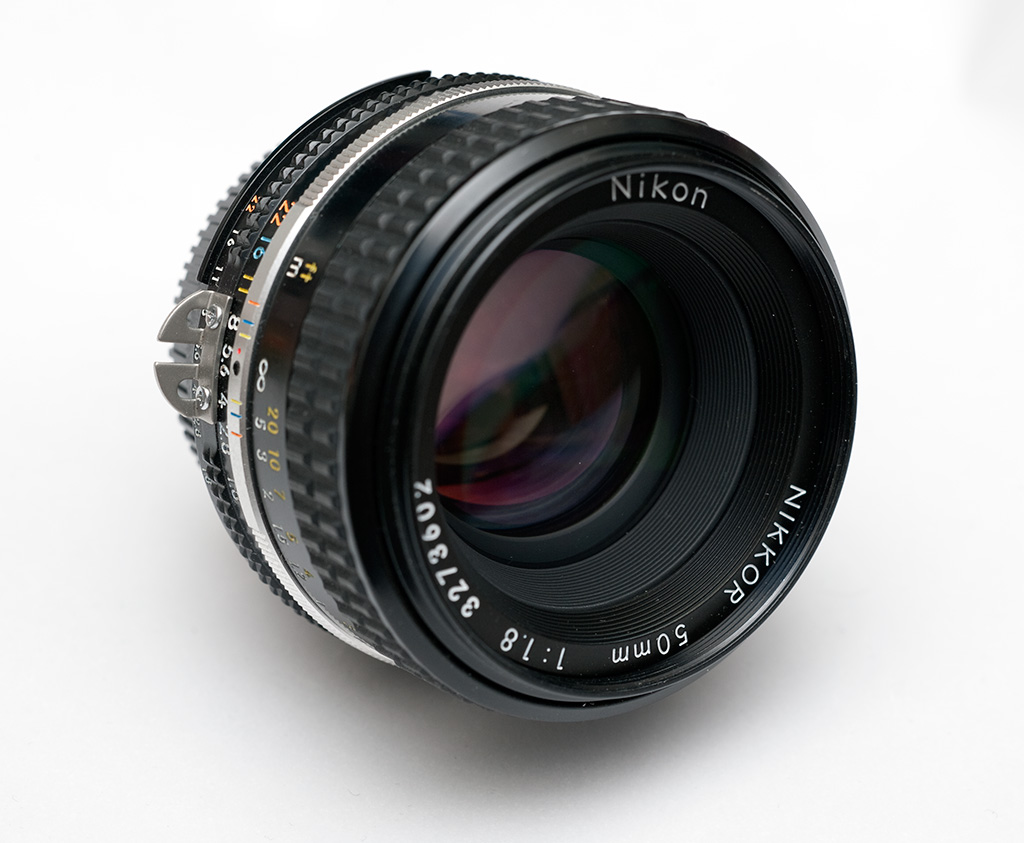
AI-S Nikkor 50 mm f/1.8
(AI/AI-S type, late 1970s to mid-1980s)

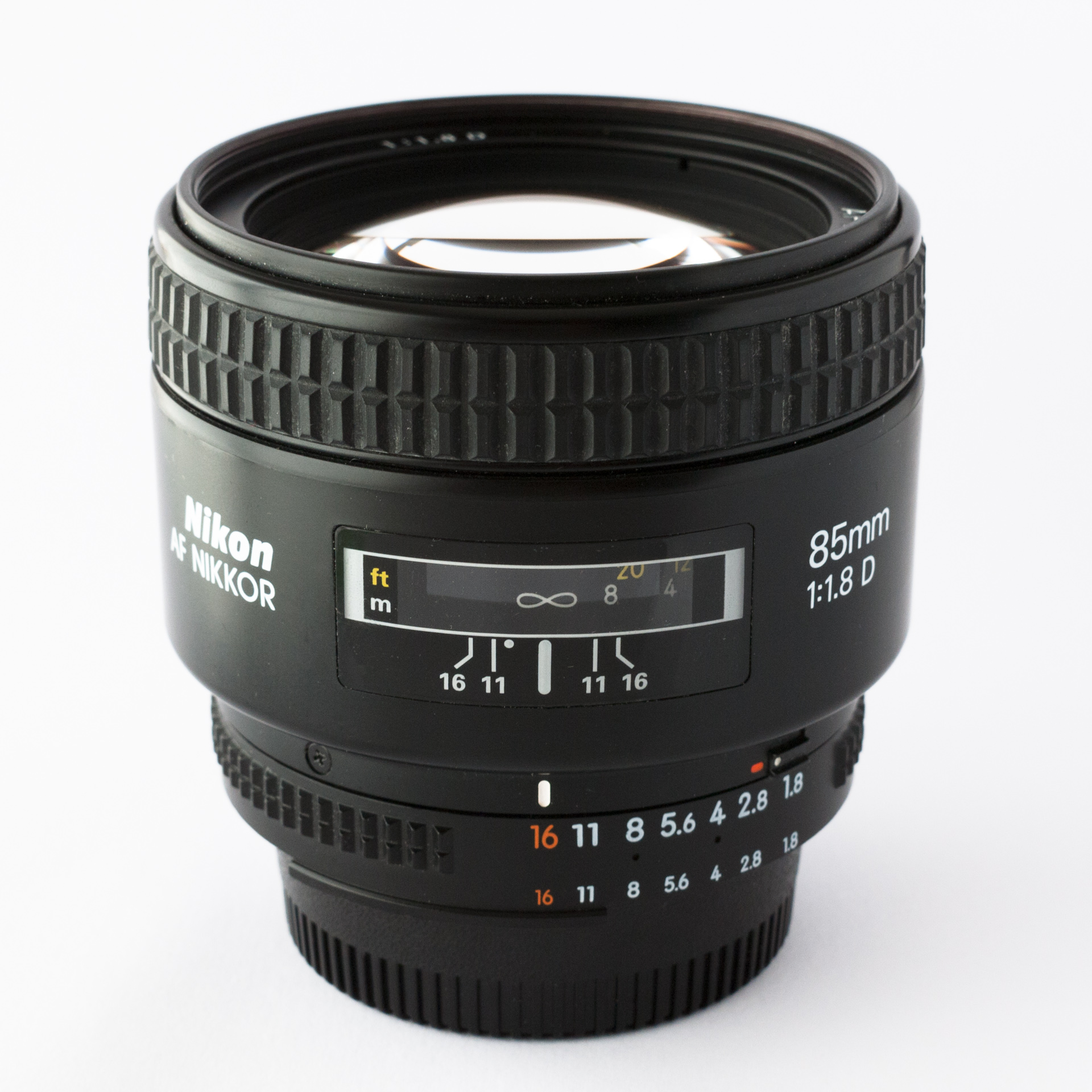
AF Nikkor 85 mm f/1.8
(AF type, mid-1980s to mid-1990s)

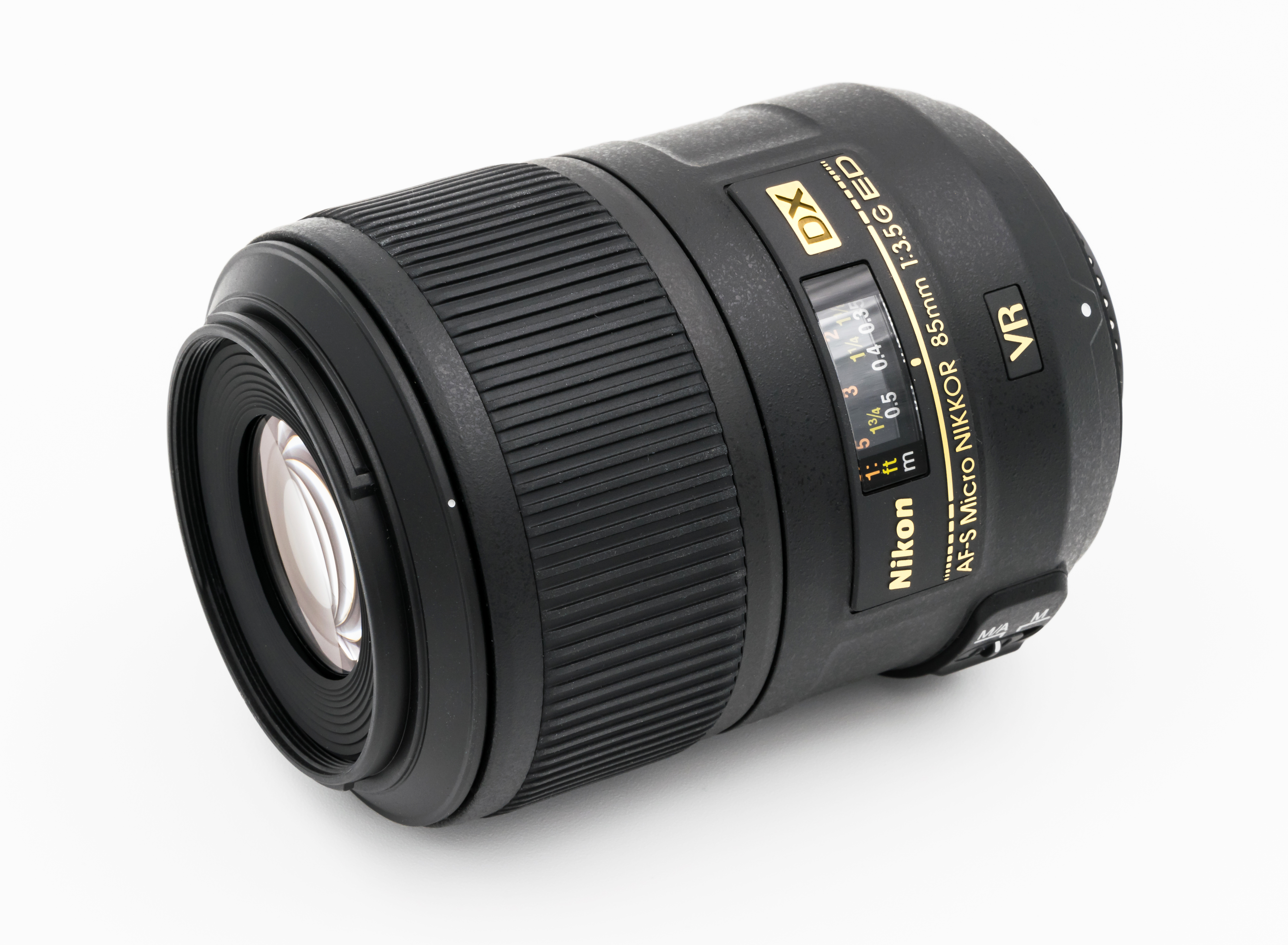
AF-S DX Micro-Nikkor 85 mm f/3.5 VR
(AF-S type, mid-1990s)

=== Nikon 1-mount ===
Nikon introduced the compact mirrorless Nikon 1 camera system using 2.7x-crop sensors in 2011. The Nikon 1 system was effectively discontinued in 2018 with the introduction of the Nikon Z system.

=== Nikonos ===
The original Nikonos system introduced in 1963 is a scale-focus and rangefinder system for underwater photography. The 1992 Nikonos RS system is an underwater autofocus SLR system based on the F-mount.

=== Nikon S-mount ===
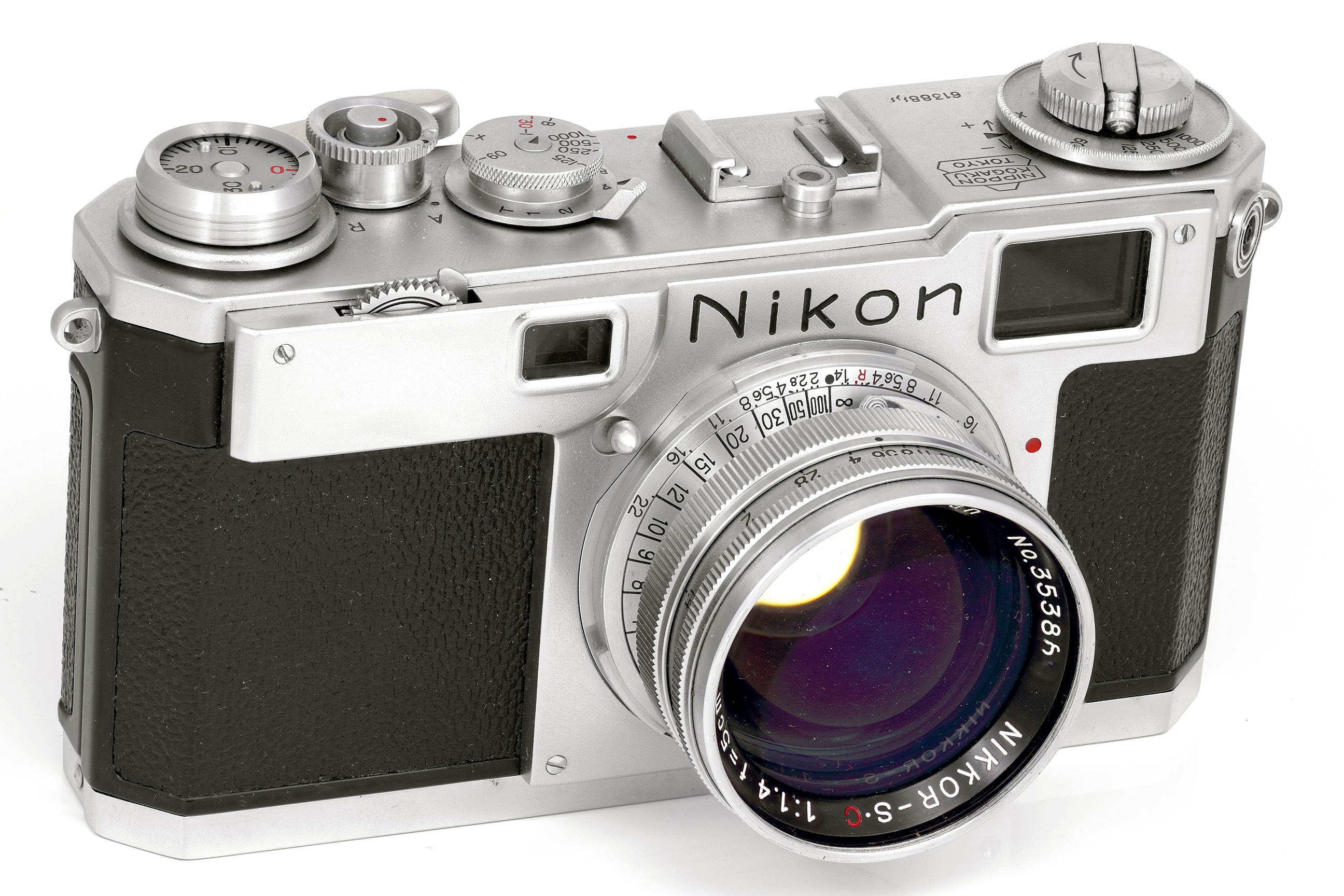
Nikkor-S-C 5 cm f/1.4 on a Nikon S2 camera

Rangefinder camera system dating to the late 1940s which became popular with the 1951 Nikon S.

== Lenses for other camera systems ==
Note: In the case of the Nikkor wides, "W" just means "wide". Prior to approximately 1976, most Nikon lenses had a suffix appended directly after the "Nikkor" name that was used to denote the number of optical elements in the lens design.

No. of Elements	Designator Letter	Origin of Designator
1	U	"Uns"
2	B	"Bini"
3	T	"Tres"
4	Q	"Quatour"
5	P	"Pente"
6	H	"Hex"
7	S	"Septem"
8	O	"Octo"
9	N	"Novem"
10	D	"Decem"
11	UD	"Uns" and "Decem"

For example, a lens with eight elements would be marked "Nikkor-O", and a lens with eleven elements "Nikkor-UD".

=== Zenza Bronica SLR ===
- Nikkor-D 40mmF4
- Nikkor-H 50mmF3.5
- Nikkor-O 50mmF2.8
- Nikkor-P 75mmF2.8 (two versions)
- Nikkor-HC 75mmF2.8
- Nikkor-Q 105mmF3.5 LS
- Nikkor-Q 135mmF3.5
- Nikkor-P 200mmF4 (two versions)
- Nikkor-PC 300mmF5.6
- Nikkor-Q 400mmF4.5
- Nikkor-P 600mmF5.6
- Nikkor-P 800mmF8
- Nikkor-P 1200mmF11

=== Leica "L" rangefinder ===
- W-Nikkor 35mmF1.8
- W-Nikkor 35mmF2.5
- Nikkor-S 50mmF1.4
- Nikkor-H 50mmF2
- Nikkor-Q 50mmF3.5
- Nikkor-P 85mmF2
- Nikkor-P 105mmF2.5
- Nikkor-Q 135mmF3.5
- Nikkor-P 135mmF3.5

=== Plaubel Makina ===
- Nikkor 80mmF2.8 (Makina 67/670)
- Wide Nikkor 55mmF4.5 (Makina W67)

=== Airesflex TLR ===
- Nikkor-Q 7.5 cmF3.5 (taking lens)
- View-Nikkor 7.5 cmF3.2 (viewing lens)

=== Marshal Press ===
- Nikkor-Q 105mmF3.5

=== Hansa Canon rangefinder ===
- "Kasyapa" 50mmF3.5 (origin of this lens uncertain)
- Nikkor 50mmF3.5

== Lenses for large format photography ==
Nikkor lenses for large format cameras
Series	FL	Ap.	Const.	Shutter	Coverage		Dimensions			Notes
Series	FL	Ap.	Const.	Shutter	Min.	Max.	Filt.	FrtΦ × RearΦ × Len.	Wgt.	Notes
Ultra wide angle lenses
SW	65	f/4–45	7e/4g	No. 0	Φ=110 mm (4.3 in), 80° f/4	Φ=170 mm (6.7 in), 105° f/16	67	70×54×67 mm (2.8×2.1×2.6 in)	370 g (13 oz)	
SW	75	f/4.5–45	7e/4g	No. 0	Φ=126 mm (5.0 in), 80° f/4	Φ=200 mm (7.9 in), 106° f/16	67	70×60×73.5 mm (2.76×2.36×2.89 in)	420 g (15 oz)	
SW	90	f/4.5–64	7e/4g	No. 0	Φ=154 mm (6.1 in), 80° f/4.5	Φ=235 mm (9.3 in), 105° f/16	82	85×70×86.7 mm (3.35×2.76×3.41 in)	600 g (21 oz)	
SW	90	f/8–64	8e/4g	No. 0	Φ=154 mm (6.1 in), 80° f/8	Φ=235 mm (9.3 in), 105° f/22	67	70×60×71 mm (2.8×2.4×2.8 in)	360 g (13 oz)	
SW	120	f/8–64	8e/4g	No. 0	Φ=200 mm (7.9 in), 80° f/8	Φ=312 mm (12.3 in), 105° f/22	77	80×80×92.5 mm (3.15×3.15×3.64 in)	610 g (22 oz)	
SW	150	f/8–64	8e/4g	No. 0	Φ=200 mm (7.9 in), 80° f/8	Φ=312 mm (12.3 in), 106° f/22	95	100×100×115.5 mm (3.94×3.94×4.55 in)	1,020 g (36 oz)	
Wide-angle lenses
W	100	f/5.6–45	6e/4g	No. 0	Φ=117 mm (4.6 in), 60° f/5.6	Φ=153 mm (6.0 in), 74° f/22	40.5	42×31.5×37.5 mm (1.65×1.24×1.48 in)	170 g (6.0 oz)	
W	105	f/5.6–45	6e/4g	No. 0	Φ=117 mm (4.6 in), 60° f/5.6	Φ=153 mm (6.0 in), 74° f/22	40.5	42×31.5×37.5 mm (1.65×1.24×1.48 in)	170 g (6.0 oz)	
W(s)	105	f/5.6–45	6e/4g	No. 0	Φ=121 mm (4.8 in), 60° f/5.6	Φ=155 mm (6.1 in), 73° f/22	52	54×42×44 mm (2.1×1.7×1.7 in)	185 g (6.5 oz)	
W	135	f/5.6–64	6e/4g	No. 0	Φ=156 mm (6.1 in), 60° f/5.6	Φ=200 mm (7.9 in), 73° f/22	52	54×42×46 mm (2.1×1.7×1.8 in)	200 g (7.1 oz)	
W	150	f/5.6–64	6e/4g	No. 0	Φ=174 mm (6.9 in), 60° f/5.6	Φ=210 mm (8.3 in), 70° f/22	52	54×42×50 mm (2.1×1.7×2.0 in)	230 g (8.1 oz)	
W	180	f/5.6–64	6e/4g	No. 1	Φ=208 mm (8.2 in), 60° f/5.6	Φ=253 mm (10.0 in), 70° f/22	67	70×54×60.5 mm (2.76×2.13×2.38 in)	380 g (13 oz)	
W	210	f/5.6–64	6e/4g	No. 1	Φ=243 mm (9.6 in), 60° f/5.6	Φ=295 mm (11.6 in), 70° f/22	67	70×60×69 mm (2.8×2.4×2.7 in)	460 g (16 oz)	
W	240	f/5.6–64	6e/4g	No. 3	Φ=278 mm (10.9 in), 60° f/5.6	Φ=336 mm (13.2 in), 70° f/22	82	85×60×77 mm (3.3×2.4×3.0 in)	820 g (29 oz)	
W	300	f/5.6–64	6e/4g	No. 3	Φ=346 mm (13.6 in), 60° f/5.6	Φ=420 mm (17 in), 70° f/22	95	100×80×94.5 mm (3.94×3.15×3.72 in)	1,250 g (44 oz)	
W	360	f/6.5–64	6e/4g	No. 3	Φ=415 mm (16.3 in), 60° f/6.5	Φ=494 mm (19.4 in), 69° f/22	95	100×80×107.5 mm (3.94×3.15×4.23 in)	1,420 g (50 oz)	
Normal lenses
M	105	f/3.5–45	4e/3g	No. 0	Φ=100 mm (3.9 in), 51° f/3.5	Φ=110 mm (4.3 in), 55° f/22	40.5	42×31.5×35.5 mm (1.65×1.24×1.40 in)	170 g (6.0 oz)	
AM*ED	120	f/5.6–45	8e/4g	No. 0	Φ=210 mm (8.3 in), 47° f/3.5	Φ=250 mm (9.8 in), 55° f/22	52	54×42×64 mm (2.1×1.7×2.5 in)	295 g (10.4 oz)	Macro
M	200	f/8–64	4e/3g	No. 0	Φ=166 mm (6.5 in), 45° f/9	Φ=210 mm (8.3 in), 55° f/22	52	54×31.5×43 mm (2.13×1.24×1.69 in)	180 g (6.3 oz)	
AM*ED	210	f/5.6–64	8e/4g	No. 1	Φ=310 mm (12 in), 41° f/3.5	Φ=400 mm (16 in), 51° f/22	67	70×70×104.5 mm (2.76×2.76×4.11 in)	850 g (30 oz)	Macro
M	300	f/9–128	4e/3g	No. 1	Φ=312 mm (12.3 in), 57° f/9	Φ=325 mm (12.8 in), 57° f/22	52	54×42×43 mm (2.1×1.7×1.7 in)	290 g (10 oz)	
M	450	f/9–128	4e/3g	No. 3	Φ=420 mm (17 in), 50° f/9	Φ=440 mm (17 in), 52° f/22	67	70×60×55 mm (2.8×2.4×2.2 in)	640 g (23 oz)	
Portrait lenses
T*ED	270	f/6.3–64	5e/4g	No. 1	Φ=114 mm (4.5 in), 24° f/6.3	Φ=160 mm (6.3 in), 33° f/22	67	70×54×99 mm (2.8×2.1×3.9 in)	810.8 g (28.60 oz)	
T*ED	360	f/8–64	5e/4g	No. 1	Φ=154 mm (6.1 in), 24° f/8	Φ=210 mm (8.3 in), 33° f/22	67	70×60×124 mm (2.8×2.4×4.9 in)	799.5 g (28.20 oz)	Convertible lens, 360/500/720 share front component
T*ED	600	f/9–64	6e/5g	No. 3	Φ=200 mm (7.9 in), 19° f/8	Φ=310 mm (12 in), 29° f/22	95	100×80×175.5 mm (3.94×3.15×6.91 in)	1,650 g (58 oz)	Convertible lens, 600/800/1200 share front component
Telephoto lenses
T*ED	500	f/11–64	6e/4g	No. 1	Φ=154 mm (6.1 in), 17° f/8	Φ=210 mm (8.3 in), 24° f/22	67	70×54×129.5 mm (2.76×2.13×5.10 in)	760 g (27 oz)	Convertible lens, 360/500/720 share front component
T*ED	720	f/16–64	7e/4g	No. 1	Φ=154 mm (6.1 in), 12° f/8	Φ=210 mm (8.3 in), 17° f/22	67	70×54×124.1 mm (2.76×2.13×4.89 in)	780 g (28 oz)	Convertible lens, 360/500/720 share front component
T*ED	800	f/12–64	7e/5g	No. 3	Φ=200 mm (7.9 in), 14° f/8	Φ=310 mm (12 in), 22° f/22	95	100×70×176.5 mm (3.94×2.76×6.95 in)	1,600 g (56 oz)	Convertible lens, 600/800/1200 share front component
T*ED	1200	f/18–64	8e/5g	No. 3	Φ=200 mm (7.9 in), 10° f/8	Φ=310 mm (12 in), 15° f/22	95	100×60×179 mm (3.9×2.4×7.0 in)	1,480 g (52 oz)	Convertible lens, 600/800/1200 share front component

=== Apo-Nikkor ===
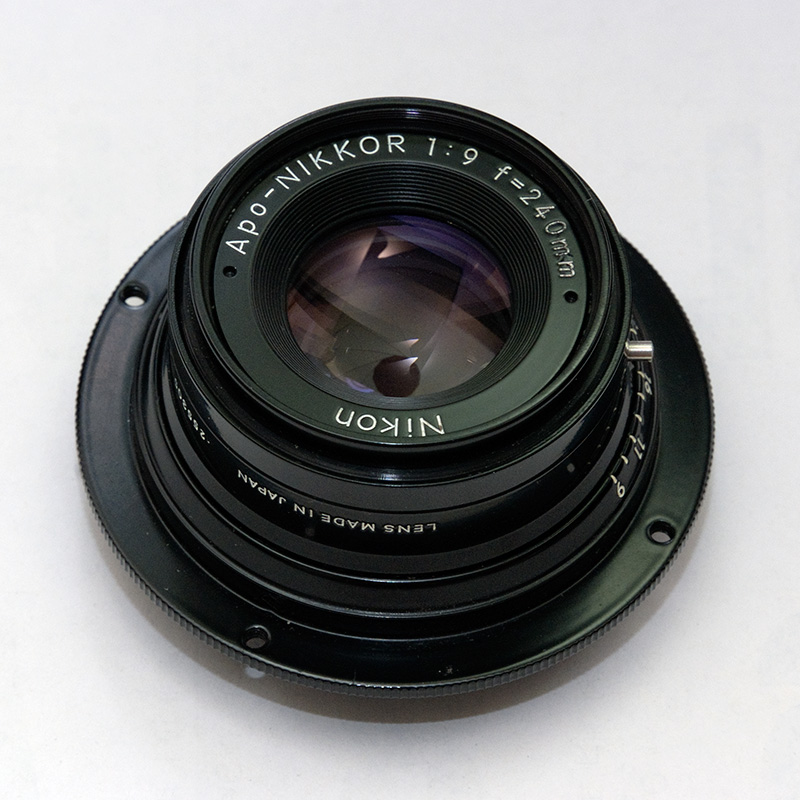
Apo-Nikkor 240mm f/9 lens

true Apochromat series, designed for the printing industry, optimized for 1:1 reproduction.

With Waterhouse type Filter Slot.

==== Apo-Nikkor / Early type ====
Lens Construction 4 elements in 3 groups / Tessar Type Lenses.

- Apo-Nikkor 12cmF9 (Release of drawing Year : 1961)
- Apo-Nikkor 15cmF9 (Release of drawing Year : 1960) - φ53mmP=0.75 Screw Mount
- Apo-Nikkor 18cmF9 (Release of drawing Year : 1962) - Image circle φ250mm。
- Apo-Nikkor 21cmF9 (Release of drawing Year : 1959)
- Apo-Nikkor 24cmF9 - Image circle φ350mm。
- Apo-Nikkor 30cmF9 (Release of drawing Year : 1949)
- Apo-Nikkor 38cmF9 (Manufacture start Year : 1946)
- Apo-Nikkor-Q.C 45cmF9 (Product Year : 1948) - φ72P=1.0mm Screw Mount
- Apo-Nikkor 60cmF9 (Release of drawing Year : 1948)
- Apo-Nikkor 75cmF9 (Release of drawing Year : 1957)
- Apo-Nikkor 90cmF9 (Release of drawing Year : 1953)

==== Apo-Nikkor / Later type ====
Lens Construction 4 elements in 4 groups / Double Gauss Type Lenses.

- Apo-Nikkor 180mmF9 - 7inch. φ53mmP=0.75 Screw Mount. - Image circle φ300mm
- Apo-Nikkor 240mmF9 - 9.5inch. φ53mmP=0.75 Screw Mount. - Image circle φ410mm
- Apo-Nikkor 305mmF9 - 12inch. φ72mmP=1.0mm Screw Mount. - Image circle φ520mm
- Apo-Nikkor 360mmF9 - 14inch. φ72mmP=1.0mm Screw Mount. - Image circle φ600mm
- Apo-Nikkor 420mmF9 - 16.5inch. φ90mmP=1.0mm Screw Mount. - Image circle φ710mm
- Apo-Nikkor 455mmF9 - 18inch. φ90mmP=1.0mm Screw Mount. - Image circle φ770mm
- Apo-Nikkor 480mmF9 - 19inch. φ90mmP=1.0mm Screw Mount. - Image circle φ820mm
- Apo-Nikkor 610mmF11 - 24inch. φ110mmP=1.0mm Screw Mount. - Image circle φ1030mm
- Apo-Nikkor 760mmF11 - 30inch. φ110mmP=1.0mm Screw Mount. - Image circle φ1170mm
- Apo-Nikkor 890mmF11 - 35inch. φ162mmP=1.5mm Screw Mount. - Image circle φ1360mm
- Apo-Nikkor 1210mmF12.5 - 47.5inch. φ162mmP=1.5mm Screw Mount. - Image circle φ1750mm
- Apo-Nikkor 1780mmF14 - 70inch. φ213mmP=1.5mm Screw Mount. - Image circle φ2310mm

==== Wide-Angle-Apo-Nikkor ====
Lens Construction 6 elements in 4 groups / Orthometar Type Lenses. The wide angle version Apo-Nikkor lens was developed for small-scale platemaking cameras.

- W.A.Apo-Nikkor 150mmF8 - φ53mmP=0.75 Screw Mount. - Image circle φ350mm。
- W.A.Apo-Nikkor 210mmF8 - φ72mmP=1.0mm Screw Mount. - Image circle φ460mm。
- W.A.Apo-Nikkor 240mmF10
- W.A.Apo-Nikkor 300mmF9 - φ90mmP=1.0mm Screw Mount. - Image circle φ610mm。
- W.A.Apo-Nikkor 360mmF9 - φ90mmP=1.0mm Screw Mount. - Image circle φ730mm

== Photographic enlarging lenses ==
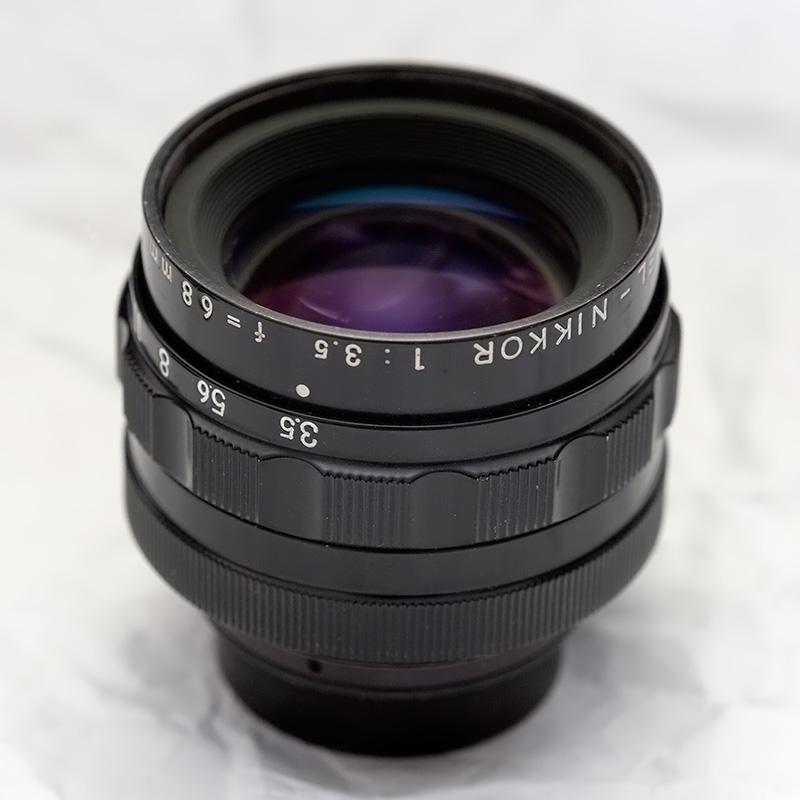
EL-Nikkor 68mm f/3.5 lens

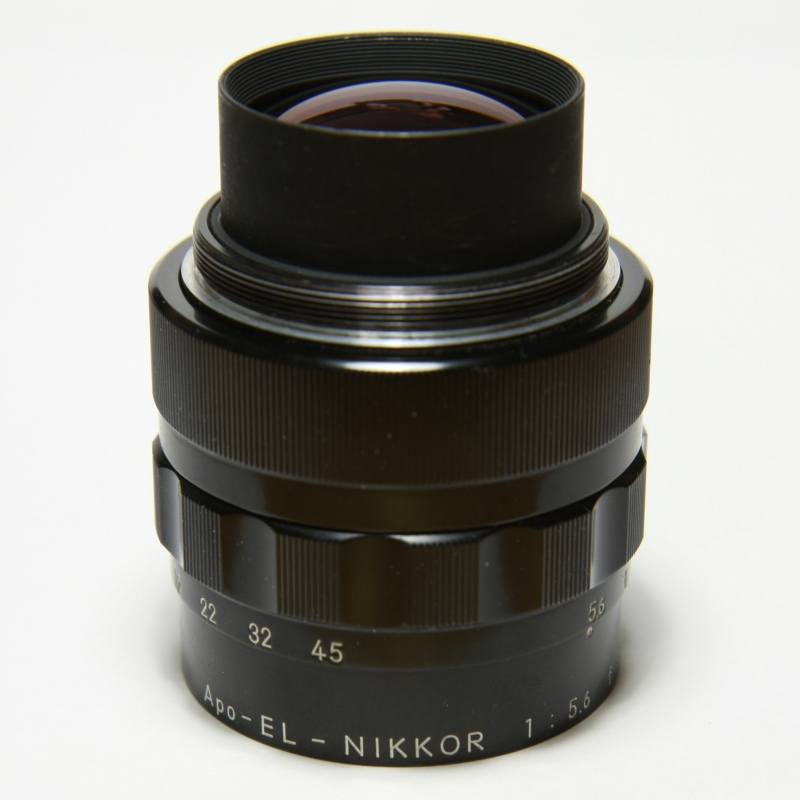
Apo-EL-Nikkor 170mm f/5.6 lens

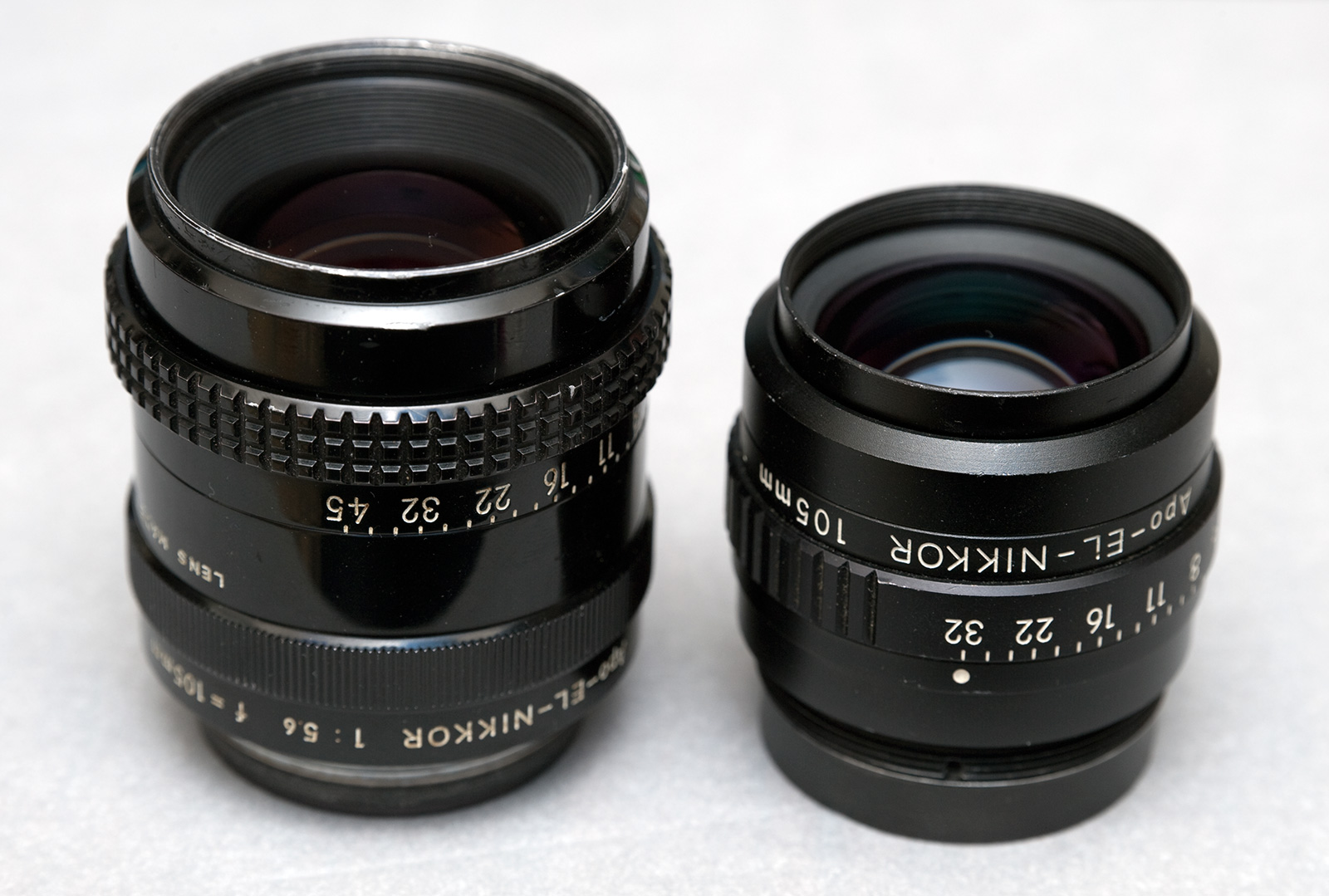
Apo-EL-Nikkor 105mm f/5.6 lenses, old type and new type (small)

=== EL-Nikkor ===
The EL-Nikkor series of lenses are designed for photographic enlargers. Most feature 39mm Leica thread mounts, although some feature a 50mm screw mount. Most are 6-element, 4-group designs. Some slower, lower-cost designs (marked †) are 4-element, 3-group designs. Newer versions of these lenses are marked with an "N" (focal lengths to 105mm) or "A" (focal lengths from 135mm). (Per Nikon, Inc. Technical and Service Support (800-645-6689), manufacture and sale of all enlarging lenses has been discontinued.)

- EL-Nikkor 40mmF4
- EL-Nikkor 5cmF2.8/50mmF2.8 (Release of drawing Year : 1956) - M39 Screw Mount.
- EL-Nikkor 5cmF3.5C - "El-NIKKOR-C"
- EL-Nikkor 5cmF3.5 (Release of drawing Year : 1945)
- EL-Nikkor 50mmF4^{†} (Release of drawing Year : 1967) - M39 Screw Mount.
- Helmes 5.5cmF3.5 (Release of drawing Year : 1936) - Tessar Type
- EL-Nikkor 63mmF2.8
- EL-Nikkor 6.3 cm/63mmF3.5(Sale Year : 1966) - M39 Screw Mount.
- EL-Nikkor 68mmF3.5 - M39 Screw Mount.
- EL-Nikkor 75mmF4 ^{†}
- EL-Nikkor 80mmF5.6 (introduced in 1966) - M39 Screw Mount. (6 elements in 4 groups / Orthometar Type Lens)
- EL-Nikkor 105mmF5.6 (introduced in 1966) - M39 Screw Mount. (6 elements in 4 groups / Orthometar Type Lens)
- EL-Nikkor 135mmF5.6 (introduced in 1966) - M39 Screw Mount & φ45mmP=0.5 Screw Mount. (6 elements in 4 groups / Orthometar Type Lens)
- EL-Nikkor 150mmF5.6 (introduced in 1968) - φ53mmP=0.75 Screw Mount. (6 elements in 4 groups / Orthometar Type Lens)
- EL-Nikkor 180mmF5.6 (introduced in 1972) - φ62mmP=1 Screw Mount. (6 elements in 4 groups / Orthometar Type Lens)
- EL-Nikkor 210mmF5.6 (introduced in 1968) - φ72mmP=1 Screw Mount. (6 elements in 4 groups / Orthometar Type Lens)
- EL-Nikkor 240mmF5.6 (introduced in 1972) - φ82mmP=1 Screw Mount. (6 elements in 4 groups / Orthometar Type Lens)
- EL-Nikkor 300mmF5.6 (introduced in 1972) - φ100mmP=1 Screw Mount. (6 elements in 4 groups / Orthometar Type Lens)
- EL-Nikkor 360mmF5.6 (introduced in 1972) - φ130mmP=1.5 Screw Mount. (6 elements in 4 groups / Orthometar Type Lens)

=== EL-Nikkor N ===
- EL-Nikkor 40mmF4N(Sale Year : 1984) - M39 Screw Mount. (Lens Construction 6 elements in 4 groups / Biogon Type Lens)
- EL-Nikkor 50mmF2.8N - M39 Screw Mount. (Lens Construction 6 elements in 4 groups / Double Gauss Type Lens)
- EL-Nikkor 50mmF4N - M39 Screw Mount. (Lens Construction 4 elements in 3 groups / Tessar Type Lens)
- EL-Nikkor 63mmF2.8N - M39 Screw Mount. (Lens Construction 6 elements in 4 groups / EL-Nikkor Type Lens)
- EL-Nikkor 75mmF4N - M39 Screw Mount. (Lens Construction 4 elements in 3 groups / Tessar Type Lens)
- EL-Nikkor 80mmF5.6N - M39 Screw Mount. (Lens Construction 6 elements in 4 groups / Orthometar Type Lens)
- EL-Nikkor 105mmF5.6N - M39 Screw Mount. (Lens Construction 6 elements in 4 groups / Orthometar Type Lens)

=== EL-Nikkor A ===
- EL-Nikkor 135mmF5.6A - M39 Screw Mount & φ50mmP=0.75 Screw Mount. (Lens Construction 6 elements in 4 groups)
- EL-Nikkor 150mmF5.6A - M39 Screw Mount & φ50mmP=0.75 Screw Mount. (Lens Construction 6 elements in 4 groups)
- EL-Nikkor 180mmF5.6A - φ72mmP=1 Screw Mount. (Lens Construction 6 elements in 4 groups)
- EL-Nikkor 210mmF5.6A - φ72mmP=1 Screw Mount. (Lens Construction 6 elements in 4 groups)
- EL-Nikkor 240mmF5.6A - φ90mmP=1 Screw Mount. (Lens Construction 6 elements in 4 groups)
- EL-Nikkor 300mmF5.6A - φ90mmP=1 Screw Mount. (Lens Construction 6 elements in 4 groups)

=== Apo-EL-Nikkor ===
The Apo-EL-Nikkor series of lenses are true Apochromat photo enlarging lenses with chromatic aberration corrected not only for the entire visible range of the spectrum, but also in near ultraviolet and near infrared ranges (380-700 nm). They are all 8-element, 4-group designs with maximum-minimum aperture of f/5.6-45.

- Apo-EL-Nikkor 105mmF5.6
- Apo-EL-Nikkor 170mmF5.6
- Apo-EL-Nikkor 210mmF5.6
- Apo-EL-Nikkor 300mmF5.6
- Apo-EL-Nikkor 480mmF5.6

=== Apo-EL-Nikkor N ===
- Apo-EL-Nikkor 105mmF5.6N
- Apo-EL-Nikkor 210mmF5.6N

=== EL-Zoom-Nikkor ===
- EL-Zoom-Nikkor 45-91mmF5.6-11.4 - Mount φ86mm (Lens Construction 15 elements in 12 groups)
- EL-Zoom-Nikkor 77-111mmF5.6-9.8 - Mount φ125mm (Lens Construction 10 elements in 10 groups)

=== Ortho-EL-Nikkor ===
- Ortho-EL-Nikkor 105mmF5.6
- Ortho-EL-Nikkor 135mmF5.6

== Industrial special-purpose lenses ==
=== Fax-Nikkor ===
Designed for 1:1 reproduction with a usable magnification range from 0.3x to 3x. Transmission from 350 to 700 nm, no focus shift between visible and actinic light used for photoresists. Completely symmetric lenses with no distortion.

- Fax-Nikkor 160mmF5.6 - φ62mmP=0.75 Screw Mount. (Lens Construction 6 elements in 4 groups)
- Fax-Nikkor 210mmF5.6 - φ72mmP=1.0 Screw Mount. (Lens Construction 6 elements in 4 groups)
- Fax-Nikkor 210mmF7
- Fax-Nikkor 260mmF10 - (Lens Construction 4 elements in 4 groups / Topogon Type Lens)
- Fax-Nikkor 300mmF7 - φ95mmP=1.0 Screw Mount.

=== Fax-Ortho-Nikkor ===
Designed for 10:1 reproduction. Field size varies from 200x200 mm to 400x400 mm with correspondingly larger image sizes and very long back-focal distances (several meters). Completely symmetric lenses with no distortion.

- Fax-Ortho-Nikkor 250mmF5.6
- Fax-Ortho-Nikkor 400mmF5.6 - (Lens Construction 6 elements in 4 groups)
- Fax-Ortho-Nikkor 500mmF5.6

=== Fish-Eye-Nikkor ===
- Fish-Eye-Nikkor 16.3mmF8 - (March, 1941 manufacture)

=== Pro-Fish-Eye-Nikkor ===
- Pro-Fish-Eye-Nikkor 2mm F1.5 - (Projection Lens)

=== Aero-Nikkor ===
The lens for aerial photographs produced at prewar days

==== Aero-Nikkor ====
- Aero-Nikkor 7.5 cm F3.5 (Sale Year : 1937)
- Aero-Nikkor 10 cm F5.6 (Sale Year : 1939)
- Aero-Nikkor 18 cm F4.5 (Sale Year : 1933)
- Aero-Nikkor 20 cm F3.5
- Aero-Nikkor 50 cm F4.8 (Sale Year : 1932) - (Lens Construction 3 elements in 3 groups)
- Aero-Nikkor 70 cm F5 (Sale Year : 1932) - (Lens Construction 3 elements in 3 groups)

==== R-Aero-Nikkor ====
- R-Aero-Nikkor 50cmF5.6

=== COM-Nikkor ===
for Computer Output Microfilming Lens

- COM-Nikkor 37mmF1.4 - M39 Screw Mount. (Lens Construction 8 elements in 6 groups)
- COM-Nikkor 88mmF2

=== CRT-Nikkor ===
for Oscilloscope Output Microfilming Lens

- Oscillo-Nikkor 55mmF1.2/CRT-Nikkor 55mmF1.2 - M39 Screw Mount. (Lens Construction 8 elements in 6 groups)
- CRT-Nikkor 58mmF1.0 - Nikon F Mount.

=== Micro-Nikkor ===
- Micro-Nikkor 55mm f3.5
- Micro-Nikkor 70mmF5 - M39 Screw Mount. (Lens Construction 5 elements in 4 groups / Xenotar Type Lens)
- Micro-Nikkor 150mmF5.6 - φ72mmP=1 Screw Mount.

=== Ultra-Micro-Nikkor ===
for Microfilming Lens

- Ultra-Micro-Nikkor 28mmF1.7e - M39 Screw Mount. (Lens Construction 10 elements in 8 groups)
- Ultra-Micro-Nikkor 28mmF1.7g - M39 Screw Mount. (Lens Construction 10 elements in 8 groups)
- Ultra-Micro-Nikkor 28mmF1.8(Sale Year : 1965) - M39 Screw Mount. (Lens Construction 9 elements in 7 groups)
- Ultra-Micro-Nikkor 28mmF1.8e - M39 Screw Mount. (Lens Construction 9 elements in 7 groups)
- Ultra-Micro-Nikkor 28mmF1.8h(Sale Year : 1967) - M39 Screw Mount. (Lens Construction 9 elements in 7 groups)
- Ultra-Micro-Nikkor 29.5mmF1.2(Sale Year : 1964) - (Lens Construction 9 elements in 6 groups, used fluorite.)
- Ultra-Micro-Nikkor 30mmF1.2 - M39 Screw Mount, φ50mmP=0.75 Screw Mount & φ55mmP=0.75 Screw Mount. (Lens Construction 9 elements in 6 groups)
- Ultra-Micro-Nikkor 30mmF1.2h(Sale Year : 1969) - M39 Screw Mount. (Lens Construction 9 elements in 6 groups)
- Ultra-Micro-Nikkor 50mmF1.8e(Sale Year : 1969) - φ52mmP=1 Screw Mount. (Lens Construction 12 elements in 9 groups)
- Ultra-Micro-Nikkor 50mmF1.8h(Sale Year : 1969) - φ52mmP=1 Screw Mount. (Lens Construction 12 elements in 9 groups)
- Ultra-Micro-Nikkor 55mmF2(Sale Year : 1965) - M39 Screw Mount.
- Ultra-Micro-Nikkor 55mmF2h(Sale Year : 1967) - M39 Screw Mount.
- Ultra-Micro-Nikkor 125mmF2.8(Sale Year : 1965) - φ62mmP=1 Screw Mount. (Lens Construction 7 elements in 6 groups)
- Ultra-Micro-Nikkor 135mmF4(Sale Year : 1965) - φ62mmP=1 Screw Mount. (Lens Construction 7 elements in 4 groups)
- Ultra-Micro-Nikkor 155mmF4 - φ72mmP=1 Screw Mount. (Lens Construction 7 elements in 4 groups)
- Ultra-Micro-Nikkor 225mmF1g(Sale Year : 1969) - φ122mmP=1 Screw Mount.
- Ultra-Micro-Nikkor 250mmF4
- Ultra-Micro-Nikkor 300mmF1.4g(Sale Year : 1969) - φ122mmP=1 Screw Mount.

=== Macro-Nikkor ===
The interchangeable lens only for large-sized macro photography equipment "Multiphot"

- Macro-Nikkor 19mmF2.8 - RMS Mount.
- Macro-Nikkor 35mmF4.5 - RMS Mount.
- Macro-Nikkor 65mmF4.5 - M39 Screw Mount.
- Macro-Nikkor 12cmF6.3 - M39 Screw Mount.

=== Printing-Nikkor ===
Was developed as an optical lens for optical printing, as demand occurs after the line sensor lenses. Thoroughly eliminate various aberrations in the reference scale, with a high color fidelity and resolution. Has now been redesigned for the Eco-glass, like the current product.

==== Printing-Nikkor ====
- Printing-Nikkor 75mmF2.8 - (Lens Construction 12 elements in 4 groups)
- Printing-Nikkor 95mmF2.8 - (Lens Construction 12 elements in 4 groups)
- Printing-Nikkor 105mmF2.8 - (Lens Construction 12 elements in 4 groups)
- Printing-Nikkor 150mmF2.8 - (Lens Construction 10 elements in 4 groups)

==== Printing-Nikkor N ====
- Printing-Nikkor 150mmF2.8N

==== Printing-Nikkor A ====
- Printing-Nikkor 95mmF2.8A - φ45mmP=0.75 Screw Mount.
- Printing-Nikkor 105mmF2.8A - φ45mmP=0.75 Screw Mount.

=== Process-Nikkor ===
The lens for table type small platemaking cameras. Lens Construction 4 elements in 4 groups. Topogon Type Lens. Standard magnification is ×1. A 400 to 650 nm chromatic aberration compensation wavelength band.

- Process-Nikkor 180mmF10 - φ62mmP=1.0 Screw Mount.
- Process-Nikkor 210mmF10 - φ72mmP=1.0 Screw Mount.
- Process-Nikkor 240mmF10 - φ82mmP=1.0 Screw Mount.
- Process-Nikkor 260mmF10 - φ90mmP=1.0 Screw Mount.

=== Rayfact ===
Rayfact is the current industrial lens brand of Tochigi-Nikon, which doesn't use the Nikkor brand any more.

==== Rayfact ====
- Rayfact ×7 OFM70350HN-TS - φ72mmP=0.75 Screw Mount.
- Rayfact ×7 OFM70350HN-TS - φ72mmP=0.75 Screw Mount.
- Rayfact ×3.5 OFM35162MN - φ67mmP=0.75 Screw Mount.
- Rayfact ×2 OFM20119MN(Sale Year : 2006) - φ45mmP=0.75 Screw Mount.
- Rayfact ×1 OFM10090MN(Sale Year : 2006) - φ45mmP=0.75 Screw Mount.
- Rayfact PF10545MF-UV - The succeeding kind which made "Ai UV-Nikkor 105mmF4.5S" eco-glass specification.
- Rayfact 25mmF1.4(Sale Year : 2001) - C Mount.

==== Rayfact IL ====
The succeeding kind of "EL-Nikkor" which ended sale in 2006.

- Rayfact IL40mm PF4040ML(Sale Year : 2007) - M39 Screw Mount.
- Rayfact IL50mm PF5028ML(Sale Year : 2007) - M39 Screw Mount.
- Rayfact IL63mm OF6328ML(Sale Year : 2007) - M39 Screw Mount.

==== Rayfact VL ====
The succeeding kind of "Printing-Nikkor". Use by a line sensor was designed as a premise from the beginning.

- Rayfact VL ×0.5 OFM05042MN - Real focus distance 119.3mm
- Rayfact VL ×0.7 OFM07052MN - Real focus distance 121.0mm
- Rayfact VL ×1 OFM10064MN - Real focus distance 123.9mm
- Rayfact VL ×1.4 OFM14074MN - Real focus distance 121.0mm

=== Repro-Nikkor ===
It is designed supposing the use as x1 copy or a relay lens.

- FR-Nikkor 75mmF1.0
- Repro-Nikkor 85mmF1.0 - φ53mmP=0.75 Screw Mount. (Lens Construction 12 elements in 8 groups)
- Repro-Nikkor 100mmF2.8
- Repro-Nikkor 170mmF1.4 - φ73mmP=0.75 Screw Mount. (Lens Construction 10 elements in 6 groups)

=== Regno-Nikkor ===
The lens for X-rays indirect photograph equipment.

- Regno-Nikkor 10cmF1.5

=== TV-Nikkor ===
The lens for fluoroscopy of an X-ray.

- TV-Nikkor 35mmF0.9 - M39 Screw Mount. (Lens Construction 9 elements in 7 groups)

=== Xero-Nikkor ===
The lens for about doubling the enlarging radiography of the documents displayed on CRT.

- Xero-Nikkor 13.5cmF2 / 135mmF2
- New Xero-Nikkor 135mmF2

== See also ==
- Rokkor
- Fujinon
- Takumar
- Zuiko
- Yashinon
- Yashikor
- Nikon F-mount
  - List of Nikon F-mount lenses with integrated autofocus motors
- Nikon Z-mount
