= Recyclebank =

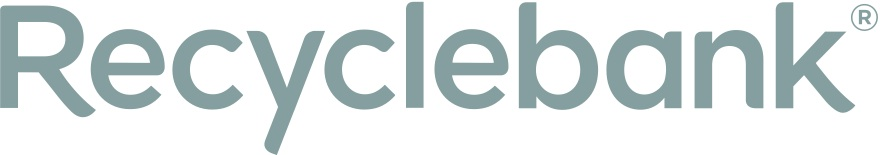
- Company type: Private
- Founded: 2004
- Founder: Patrick FitzGerald; Ron Gonen
- Headquarters: New York, New York
- Area served: Nationwide
- Key people: Javier Flaim, Chief Executive Officer
- Number of employees: 180
- Website: recyclebank.com (US)

Recyclebank is a company based in New York City that promotes recycling and environmental awareness. It provides a rewards program for various goods. A Certified B Corporation, Recyclebank is headquartered in New York City.

== History ==
In 2001, New York City was considering cancelling its recycling program. Then Fordham Law student Patrick FitzGerald drafted a business model to financially incentivize people to recycle and allow businesses to promote sustainability. In 2003, he contacted Ron Gonen, a high school friend, for assistance. By 2003, the two had completed a business plan, and by 2004, began a pilot program in Philadelphia. In 2009, Recyclebank became a certified B corporation.

== See also ==
- Efficient energy use
- Gamification
- Sustainability
- Triple Bottom Line
- Waste Management
