= Nikon I, M and S =

Nikon I, Nikon M, Nikon S
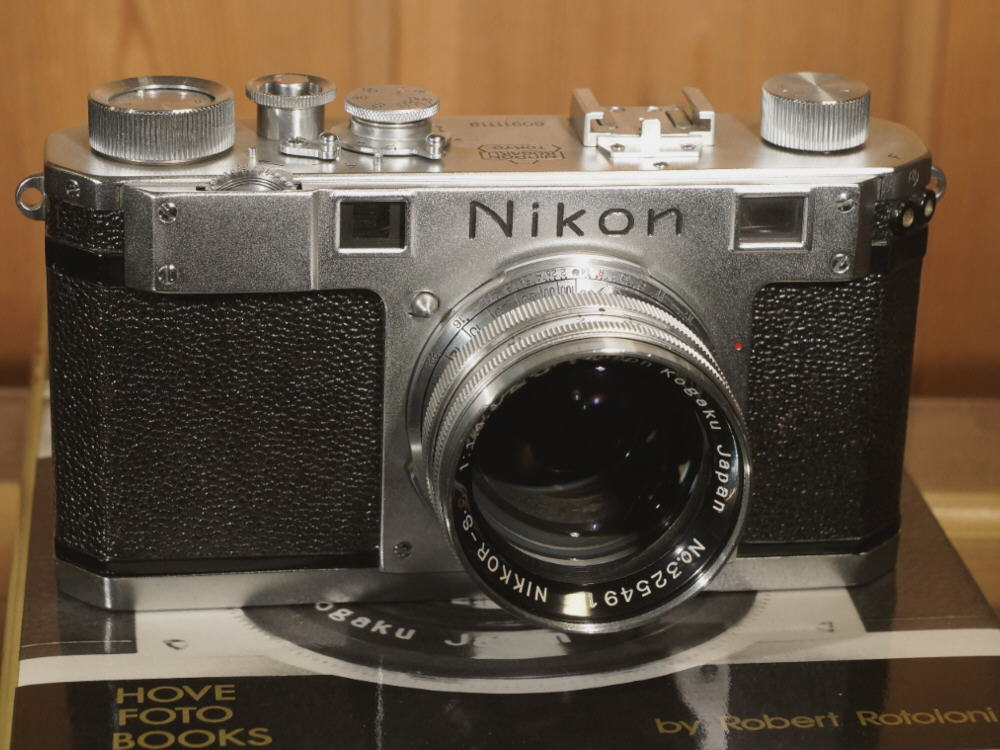
- Nikon S (1951), chrome version

Overview
- Maker: Nikon (Nippon Kogaku K. K.)
- Type: 35 mm rangefinder camera
- Released: 1948 Nikon I, 1949 Nikon M, 1951 Nikon S
- Production: 1948-1953

Lens
- Lens mount: Nikon 'S' bayonet mount
- Lens: interchangeable lens

Sensor/medium
- Film format: 35 mm
- Film size: 36 mm × 24 mm

Focusing
- Focus: manual

Exposure/metering
- Exposure: manual

Shutter
- Shutter: mechanical

General
- Made in: Japan

Chronology
- Successor: Nikon S2

Nikon's rangefinder cameras, starting with the Nikon I in 1948, marked the entry of Nippon Kogaku K.K. into the photographic market, following its focus on optical instruments such as lenses and microscopes. These models, including the Nikon I, M, S, and subsequent series, utilized the S-Mount bayonet, inspired by the Contax RF system, and featured a compact design with a rangefinder viewfinder. They helped establish Nikon as a leading brand in professional photography until the shift to reflex cameras in the 1960s.

== Nikon I (1948) ==
The Nikon was the first camera introduced by the optical manufacturer Nippon Kogaku KK. It is a 35mm rangefinder camera, in retrospect known as the Nikon I. The original design was approved by September 1946, and the camera was released in March 1948. At first, it was sold locally, and it did not come to the attention of the western media until 1950, when photographers from the magazine Life were shown photographs taken with these cameras. The lenses drew special attention, like the Nikkor-P.C 1:2 f=8.5cm. A demand to fit Nikkors to the reporters' Leicas were immediately met at the factory in Tokyo, and soon the word spread about these Japanese lenses which were just as good as, or possibly better than, their German counterparts. The camera design was strongly inspired by the German Contax and Leica cameras. After careful studies of these, Nippon Kogaku had decided to base their camera on the Contax, but substitute the complicated shutter design for the cloth focal plane shutter of the Leica, these being considered the best features from either camera. The original Nikon I, as introduced in 1948, had no flash synchronisation, but was otherwise a full-fledged up-to-date rangefinder camera. The designers chose the 24 × 32 mm frame size pioneered by the Minolta 35 launched a year earlier by Chiyoda Kogaku, known as the Nippon format, which yielded more frames per length of film, and matched more closely the common paper sizes. However, the camera never caught on, because the US administration in Tokyo did not permit export to the US due to the nonstandard format, which was incompatible with the Kodak slide mounts.

== Nikon M (1949) ==
In consequence, the Nikon M was introduced in the autumn 1949. This model is recognised by the M preceding the body number. Nippon Kogaku had settled for an intermediate frame format of 24 × 34 mm, hoping to find acceptance on the export market. Why Nippon Kogaku was reluctant to go all the way to the widely accepted standard size, is not fully understood, the camera itself seems prepared to accommodate the full frame size for the vast majority of situations. In fact, a new improved model was planned, retaining the non-standard frame format.

== Nikon S (1951) ==
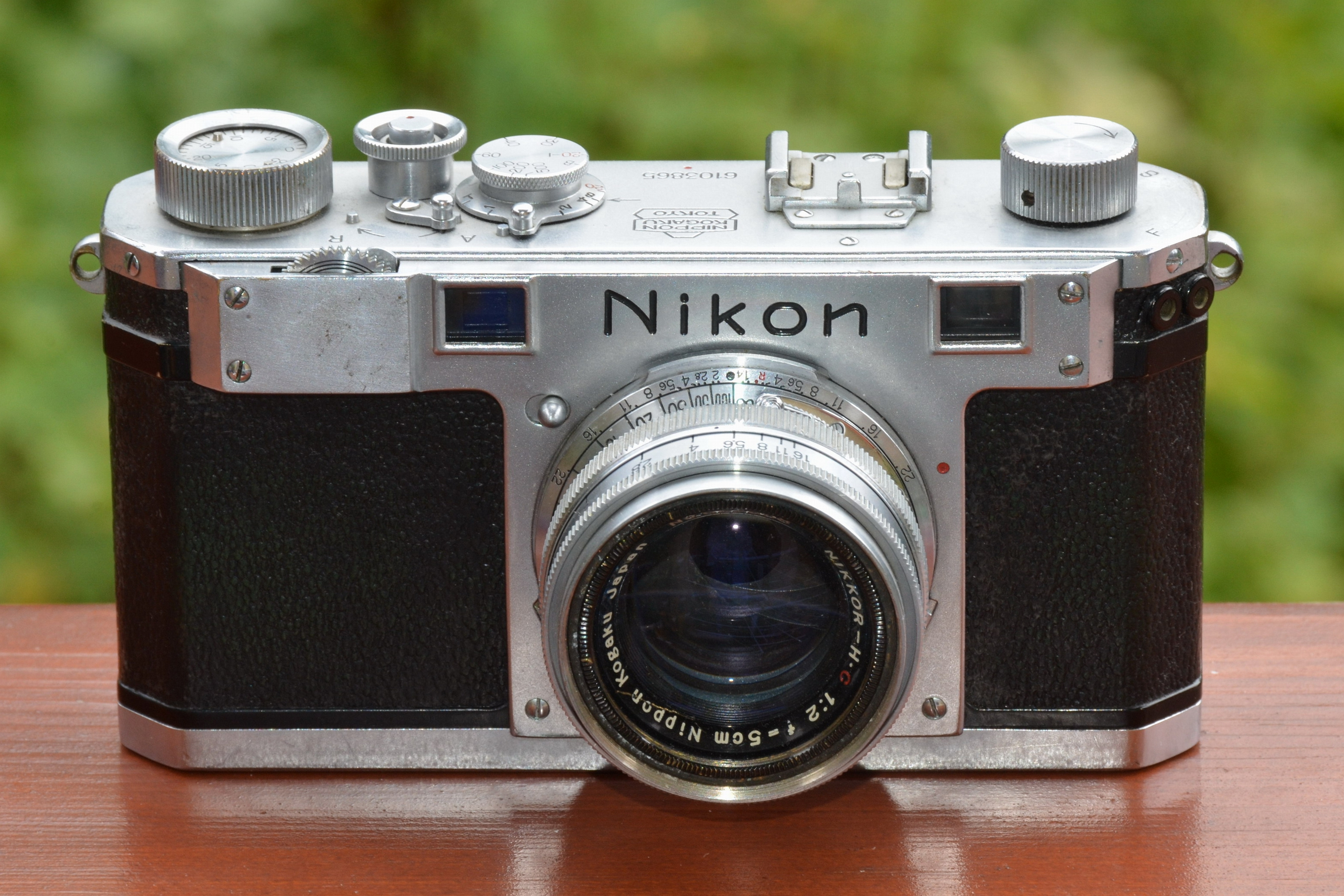
Nikon S with NIKKOR H.C 1:2 f=5cm lens

The improved model was the Nikon S, long overdue when made available early in 1951; it is a Nikon M with flash sync contacts, two sockets at the upper left-hand edge of the body. All cameras sold with this feature are considered a Nikon S by the factory, even if marked M, though collectors do distinguish these as more valuable than the S. The Nikon S sold well, and became the first Nikon imported to the US market. A number of Nikon S cameras have one more serial number digit, known as the 8-digit Nikon S. When reaching 6099999 the engraver continued at 60910000, but it was soon realized that the long serial number was impractical, and after some 1200 cameras, the numbering reverted to 6100000. The 609 prefix in the serial number refers to the date the design was approved in September 1946.

The Nikon S was the last Nikon camera model to use a non-standard film format. Both it and the Nikon M used 24 x 34mm. Beginning with the Nikon S2, all subsequent models would use 24 x 36mm.

== Nikon Professional Rangefinder cameras ==
Several further Nikon rangefinder models were introduced throughout the 1950s: the S2, S3, S4, and SP. The latter three were built on the same frame with different features; the Nikon F SLR shares the basic body configuration of the latest rangefinder models.

Camera	Year	Film Format	Finder Mag	Finder Framelines (mm)	Max Shutter	Notes / Refs.
Nikon I	1948	24 x 32mm	0.6x	50	1/500	
Nikon M	1949	24 x 34mm	0.6x	50	1/500	
Nikon S	1951	24 x 34mm	0.6x	50	1/500	
Nikon S2	1954	24 x 36mm	1x	50	1/1000	
Nikon SP	1957	24 x 36mm	1x	28, 35, 50, 85, 105, 135	1/1000	
Nikon S3	1958	24 x 36mm	1x	35, 50, 105	1/1000	
Nikon S4	1959	24 x 36mm	1x	50, 135	1/1000	entry-level
Nikon S3M	1960	18 x 24mm	1x	35, 50, 135	1/1000	
Nikon S3 2000	2000	24 x 36mm	1x	35, 50, 105	1/1000	
Nikon SP; Limited Edition	2005	24 x 36mm	1x	28, 35, 50, 85, 105, 135	1/1000	

== See also ==
- Nikon
- Nikon S2
- Nikon S3
- Nikon S4
- Nikon SP
- Nikon S3M
- Nikon S-mount

1948	1949	1950	1951	1952	1953	1954	1955	1956	1957	1958	1959	1960	1961	1962	1963	1964	1965	1966	1967
Nikon^{NF}																			
		M^{NF}																	
			S^{F}																
							S2^{F}												
										S3^{F}									
											SP^{F}								
											S4^{F}								
													S3M^{F}						
Specials		S3 2000 (2000); SP Limited Edition (2005)																	
