= Nikon SP =

35 mm rangefinder camera

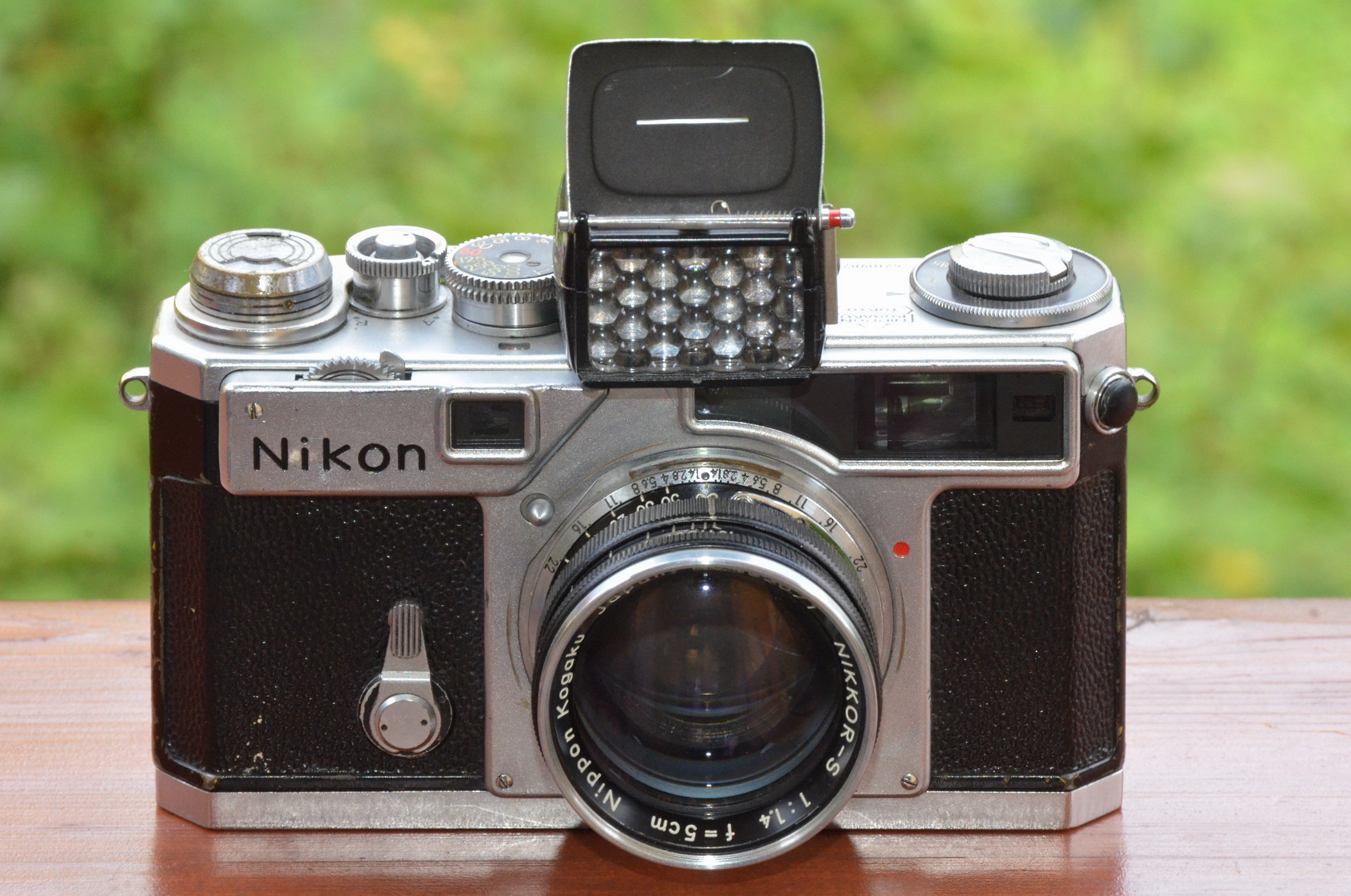
- Nikon SP chrome with matching Nikon exposure meter and NIKKOR-S 1:1,4 f=5cm lens

Overview
- Maker: Nikon
- Type: 35 mm rangefinder camera

Lens
- Lens mount: Nikon 'S' bayonet mount
- Lens: interchangeable lens

Sensor/medium
- Film format: 35 mm
- Film size: 36 mm × 24 mm
- Film advance: manual
- Film rewind: manual

Focusing
- Focus modes: Split and superposed-image rangefinder

Exposure/metering
- Exposure modes: Manual (M), and Bulb (B)
- Exposure metering: no integrated meter

Flash
- Flash: PC Sync
- Flash synchronization: 1/60 s

Shutter
- Shutter: mechanically timed
- Shutter speed range: 1 s to 1/1000 s with Bulb and 1/60 s flash-sync
- Continuous shooting: 1 FPS manual wind, 3 FPS S-36 motordrive

Viewfinder
- Viewfinder: Dual brightline and etched frame viewfinder
- Viewfinder magnification: 1x

General
- Optional motor drives: S-36 motordrive
- Dimensions: 136 mm (w) × 81 mm (h) × 43 mm (d)
- Weight: 590 g (21 oz) (1.30 lb)
- Made in: Japan

The Nikon SP is a professional-level, interchangeable lens, 35 mm rangefinder camera introduced in 1957. It is the culmination of Nikon's rangefinder development which started in 1948 with the Nikon I, and was "arguably the most advanced rangefinder of its time." It was manufactured by the Japanese optics company Nippon Kogaku K. K. (Nikon Corporation since 1988). Three other lower featured rangefinder models were subsequently produced on the SP frame, and production continued into the 1960s, but further development of Nikon's professional rangefinders ended with the introduction and success of the single lens reflex Nikon F in 1959.

In 2005, 2,500 models of a reproduction model were manufactured under the name of "Nikon SP Limited Edition". The camera was exclusively sold in Japan and came with a (modern multi-coated) W-Nikkor 3.5 cm f/1.8 lens.

== Features ==
The Nikon SP has dual viewfinders providing frame lines for a total of six focal lengths. The main viewfinder has 1x magnification and has frame lines for 50 mm, 85 mm, 105 mm and 135 mm (selected by rotating a dial under the rewind crank). The frames are parallax-corrected and the focusing patch appears in the centre of the viewfinder. A separate, smaller viewfinder (less than life size) to the left of the main viewfinder has non-parallax corrected frame lines for 35 mm. The entire window acts as a frame for 28 mm lenses.

The camera uses Nikon's 'S' bayonet lens mount which is a modified Contax 'C' bayonet and Contax 'C' lenses are physically compatible but do not accurately focus with the built-in rangefinder. In common with Contax, a small toothed wheel in front of the shutter release is used to focus lenses that use the internal bayonet.

The camera does not have a flash sync on its hot shoe. Instead a pc sync socket is provided. The shutter on early models is a horizontally running mechanically timed rubberized silk fabric curtain. In 1959 the shutter curtain was changed to titanium similar to the Nikon F.

The camera will advance film at a rate of 3 FPS with an added S-36 motor drive. This made the SP the first rangefinder to have motorized film advance.

The Nikon F SLR of 1959 has many structural similarities to the SP from which it evolved with the addition of a reflex mirror and interchangeable pentaprism viewfinder.

== Nikon SP Limited Edition (2005) ==
In 2001, following the success of the Nikon S3 reproduction to commemorate the Year 2000, Nikon began work on a limited-edition reproduction of the SP camera. Owing to the nearly 50-year time lapse between the release of the original SP in 1957 and the planned release of the reproduction in 2005, many of the original manufacturing methods and assembly lines had been lost and needed to be reconstituted. Nikon engineers started by purchasing two secondhand copies of the original SP to dissemble and study. The complexity of the dual viewfinder, with a 1:1 magnification main finder encompassing parallax-corrected 50mm, 85mm, 105mm, and 135mm frame lines next to an auxiliary wide finder with uncorrected 28mm and 35mm frame lines, was particularly difficult to reproduce. Nikon cites that the reproduction SP's viewfinder assembly with its 28 internal lens elements took ten times as much assembly time as the Nikon FM3A camera, which was itself a fairly sophisticated electro-mechanical single-lens reflex camera.

Orders for the SP Limited Edition, which was only available in painted black, were open only to Japanese customers from January 14, 2005 through June 30, 2005, with first shipments arriving in March 2005. The camera retailed for 690,000 JPY before tax (approximately US$6,228 in June 2005) and only 2,500 sequentially serialized copies were produced. Each camera was paired with a modern reproduction of the W-Nikkor-C 3.5 cm f/1.8 lens in matching black paint, with a matching serial number.

Given the relatively exorbitant price, rarity, and vintage mechanical nature of the camera, at a time when most photographers had migrated to DSLR cameras with auto-focus and auto-exposure capability, many of the purchased copies were left unused in their boxes as collector's items. As a result, it is possible as of 2025 to purchase a full kit with the reproduction camera, matched lens, and all the original packaging from various secondhand camera stores in Japan.

The 2005 reproduction has several material changes compared to the original; some are listed here:

- Focusing scale updated from meters to meters and feet
- Film speed reminder dial changed from ASA units to ISO
- Lens cap changed to aluminum, and strap lugs changed to steel
- Lens optical formula modified to eliminate use of radioactive lanthanum
- Lens coatings updated to more modern formulas for less flaring and better contrast

== Specifications ==
- Shutter: Horizontal running rubberized silk fabric curtain type focal plain shutter
- Shutter speeds: T, B and 1, 1/2, 1/4, 1/8, 1/15, 1/30, 1/60, 1/125, 1/250, 1/500 and 1/1000 seconds (regular interval graduation)
- Range marker: M inscription (XXINF – 0.9)
- Self-timer: Connect time variable system (the graduation of 3, 6 and 10 seconds it is attached)
- Pc socket: Time lag variable system, it aligns the synchronizer socket attachment and the speed light/write in 1/60 seconds less than
- Finder: Rangefinder type fixed 1x magnification finder (wide angle finder for 28 mm and 35 mm finder)
- Framelines: Auxiliary window: 28 mm, 35 mm; Main window (parallax corrected): 50 mm, 85 mm, 105 mm and 135 mm
- Film wind: Hand operated lever system, 136 degree revolution (multiple winds possible), with 15 degree extra withdrawal angles
- Film rewind: Manual Crank system
- Film: 135 Film (35 mm film) with 36 mm × 24 mm image size

== In popular culture ==
The camera is seen in the background, casually slung from the hand of Bob Neuwirth in Daniel Kramer's portrait of Bob Dylan that is the over image of his "Highway 61 Revisited" of 1965.

== See also ==
- Nikon
- Nikon F
- Nikon S3

1948	1949	1950	1951	1952	1953	1954	1955	1956	1957	1958	1959	1960	1961	1962	1963	1964	1965	1966	1967
Nikon^{NF}																			
		M^{NF}																	
			S^{F}																
							S2^{F}												
										S3^{F}									
											SP^{F}								
											S4^{F}								
													S3M^{F}						
Specials		S3 2000 (2000); SP Limited Edition (2005)																	
