= Nikon 1-mount =

Digital camera lens mount

- Type: Bayonet
- External diameter: 40 mm
- Tabs: 3
- Flange: 17 mm
- Connectors: 12 electrical pins
- Introduced: 2011
- Discontinued: 2018

The Nikon 1-mount is a type of interchangeable lens mount developed by Nikon for its Nikon CX format mirrorless interchangeable-lens cameras. The 1-mount was first introduced on the Nikon 1 series in 2011, and features a three-lug bayonet mount with a 40 mm throat and a flange to focal plane distance of 17 mm.

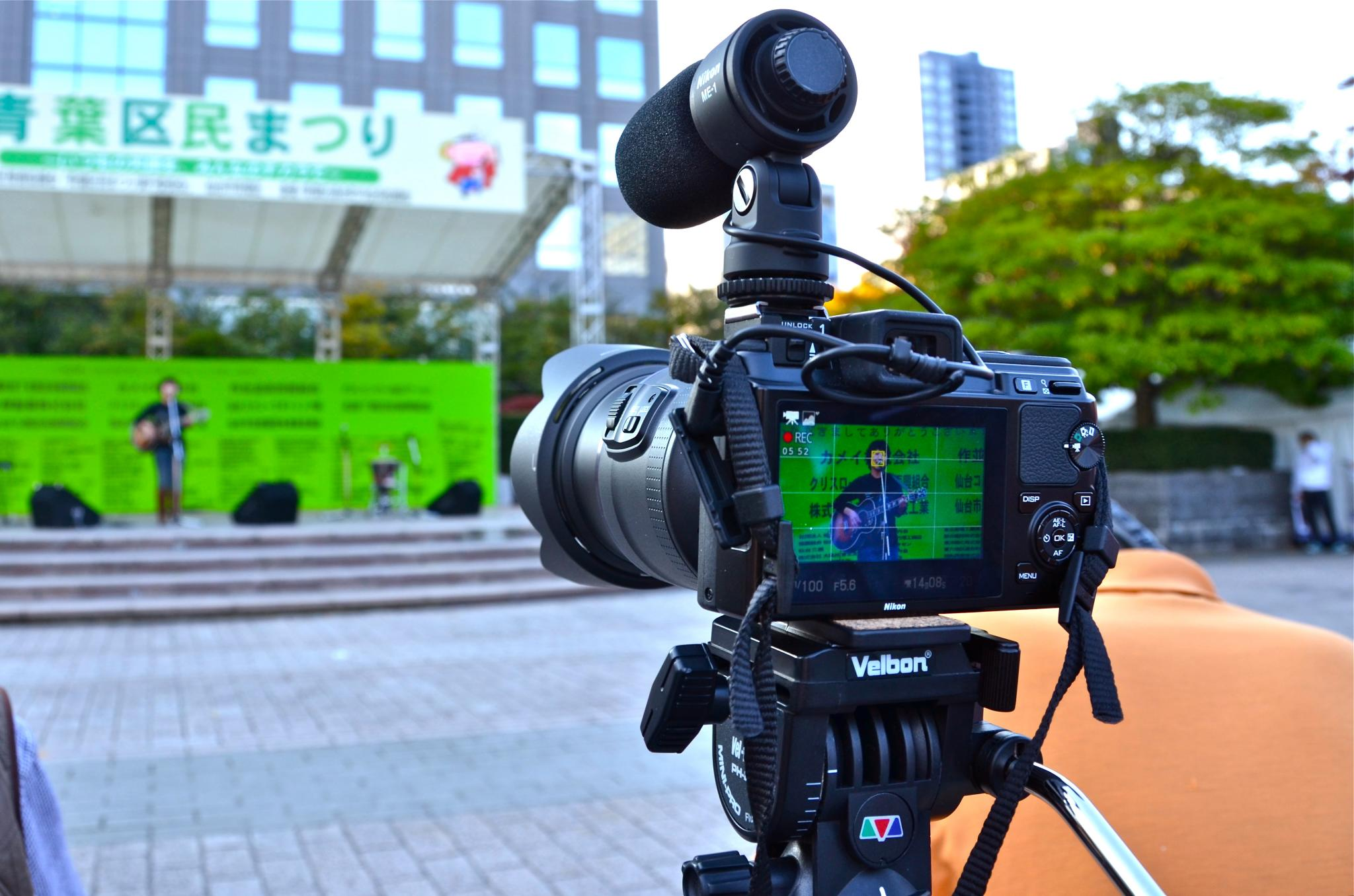
Nikon 1 V1 with Nikkor VR 10-100mm f/4.5-5.6 PD-Zoom and ME-1 stereo microphone in HD-video use

== Cameras ==
The Nikon 1 series of mirrorless interchangeable lens cameras was originally announced on 21 September 2011 with two cameras, the Nikon 1 V1 and the Nikon 1 J1. It grew over the following seven years to have a total of 11 cameras. Nikon discontinued the series in July 2018, when the Nikon Z-mount was introduced.

== Lenses ==
=== Zoom lenses ===
Lens	35mm equiv.	Elements/ Groups (ED / Asph.)	Angle of view	Aperture Range	Min. Focus	Weight	Size (Diameter × Length)	Filter Thread (mm)
1 Nikkor VR 6.7–13 mm	18–35 mm f/9.5–15	11/7 (3E/3A)	100° - 63°	f/3.5/5.6–16	0.25 m (0.82 ft)	125 g (4.4 oz)	56.5×46 mm (2.2×1.8 in)	52
1 Nikkor VR 10–30 mm	27–82 mm f/9.5–15	12/9 (0E/3A)	77° - 29°40'	f/3.5/5.6–16	0.2 m (0.66 ft)	115 g (4.1 oz)	57.5×42 mm (2.3×1.7 in)	40.5
1 Nikkor 11–27.5 mm	30–75 mm f/9.5–15	8/6 (1E/1A)	72° - 32°20'	f/3.5/5.6–16	0.3 m (1.0 ft)	80 g (2.8 oz)	57.5×31 mm (2.26×1.22 in)	40.5
1 Nikkor VR 10–100 mm	27–273 mm f/11–15	19/12 (3H/2E/3A)	77° - 9°10'	f/4.0/5.6–16	0.35 and 0.65 m (1.1 and 2.1 ft)	298 g (10.5 oz)	60.5×70.5 mm (2.38×2.78 in)	55
1 Nikkor VR 30–110 mm	82–300 mm f/10–15	18/12 (0E/0A)	29°40' - 8°20'	f/3.8/5.6–16	1 m (3.3 ft)	175 g (6.2 oz)	60×61 mm (2.4×2.4 in)	40.5
1 Nikkor VR 70–300 mm	191–818 mm f/12–15	16/10 (1E/0A)	13° - 3°	f/4.5/5.6–16	1.0 and 1.6 m (3.3 and 5.2 ft)	550 g (19.4 oz)	73×108 mm (2.9×4.3 in)	62

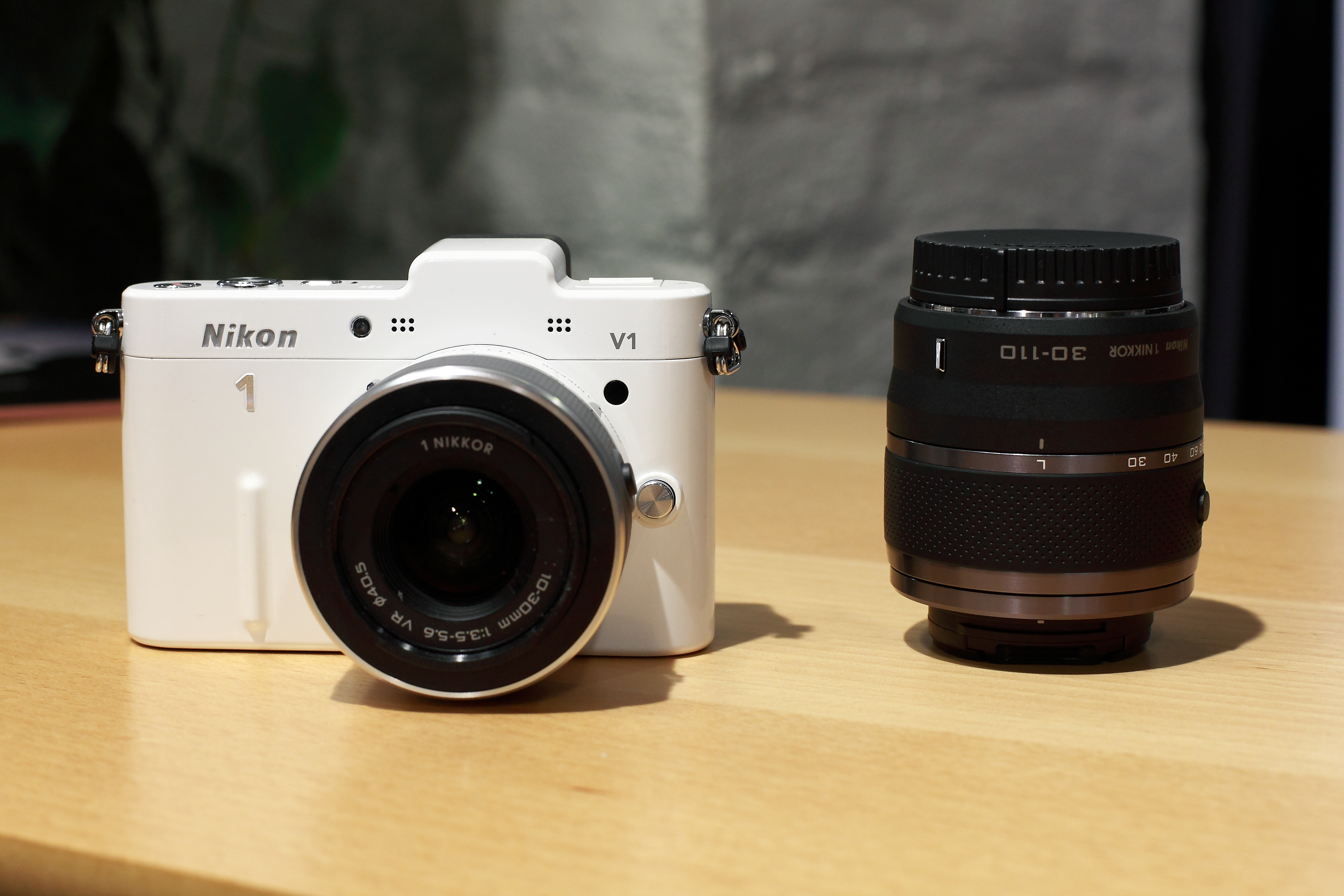
Nikon V1 with 10-30mm zoom fitted, and 30-110mm zoom to one side

=== Power zoom lenses ===
These lenses have an in-lens motor to operate the focal length control, aimed at making smooth zooms during videography.

Lens	35mm equiv.	Elements/ Groups (ED / Asph.)	Angle of view	Aperture Range	Min. Focus	Weight	Size (Diameter × Length)	Filter Thread (mm)
1 Nikkor VR 10-100 mm	27–273 mm f/12–15	21/14 (1H/3E/2A)	77° - 9°10'	f/4.5/5.6–16	0.3 and 0.85 m (1.0 and 2.8 ft)	515 g (18.2 oz)	77×95 mm (3.0×3.7 in)	72
1 Nikkor VR 10-30mm	27–82 mm f/9.5–15	9/7 (1E/4A)	77° - 29°40'	f/3.5/5.6–16	0.2 m (0.7 ft)	85 g (3.0 oz)	58×28 mm (2.3×1.1 in)	—N/a

=== Prime lenses ===
Lens	35mm equiv.	Elements/ Groups (ED / Asph.)	Angle of view	Aperture Range	Min. Focus	Weight	Size (Diameter × Length)	Filter Thread (mm)
1 Nikkor 10 mm	27 mm f/8	6/5 (2A)	77°	f/2.8–11	0.2 m (0.66 ft)	77 g (2.7 oz)	55.5×22 mm (2.2×0.9 in)	40.5
1 Nikkor 18.5 mm	50 mm f/5	8/6 (1A)	46°40'	f/1.8–16	0.2 m (0.7 ft)	70 g (2.5 oz)	56×36 mm (2.20×1.42 in)	40.5
1 Nikkor 32 mm	87 mm f/3	9/7	28°	f/1.2–16	0.45 m (1.5 ft)	235 g (8.3 oz)	65.5×47 mm (2.6×1.9 in)	52

=== All-weather lens ===
Lenses are optically identical to their non-sealed counterparts and use the same bayonet, but have an extended flange to ensure a watertight seal with the Nikon 1 AW1 body.

Lens	35mm equiv focal length	Elements/ Groups (ED / Asph.)	Angle of view	Aperture Range	Min. Focus	Weight	Size (Diameter × Length)	Filter Thread (mm)
1 Nikkor AW 10 mm	27 mm f/8	6/5 (2A)	77°	f/2.8–11	0.2 m (0.7 ft)	118 g (4.2 oz)	61×30 mm (2.4×1.2 in)	40.5
1 Nikkor 11–27.5 mm	30–75 mm f/9.5–15	8/6 (1E/1A)	72° - 32°20'	f/3.5/5.6–16	0.3 m (0.98 ft)	182 g (6.4 oz)	63×56.5 mm (2.5×2.2 in)	40.5

=== Nikon 1-mount adapter to use F-mount lenses ===
Nikon SLR cameras, both film and digital, have used the Nikon F-mount with its 44 mm throat diameter and 46.5 mm flange since 1959, while the 1-mount has a 40 mm throat diameter and a 17 mm flange distance. The FT-1 lens adapter allows many F-mount lenses to be used on 1-mount cameras. The FT-1 adds 29.5 mm to the length of the attached lens, which is the difference in flange distance between the Nikon F-mount (46.5 mm) and the 1-mount (17 mm). When used with the FT-1, F-mount lenses have a 2.7x crop factor, e.g., a 300mm lens acts like an 800mm lens.

An adapter is attached to a powered-off camera in the same manner as a lens. Once it is attached, the F-mount lens can then be attached to the adapter.

The mount adapter provided by Nikon to support F-mount lenses on their 1-mount mirrorless cameras is:

- Nikon FT-1: The FT-1 supports the use of all F-mount lenses especially with integrated autofocus motor. The FT-1 adapter mounts and meters with all AI-P, AF, AF-S, D and G lenses and compatibles providing autofocus with all lenses with integrated autofocus motor. It further mounts Pre-AI, AI, AI-S and E lenses without metering as well as lenses which jut out the F-mount. Although not recommended, it can be used with teleconverters for extreme telephotos.

=== Third party lens ===
Lens	35mm equiv focal length	Elements/ Groups (ED / Asph.)	Angle of view	Aperture Range	Min. Focus	Weight	Size (Diameter × Length)	Filter Thread (mm)
Rokinon RMC7.5-NI DÖRR 361111 Fisheye 7.5mm Nikon 1 Opteka 7.5mm f/8 HDMC Fisheye Nikon 1	20 mm	4/4	162°	f/8.0	0.3 m (1 ft 0 in)	220 g (7.8 oz)	65×52 mm (2.6×2.0 in)	—N/a

== Future lenses ==
At the Nikon 1 launch in October 2011, Nikon showcased seven prototype lenses. As of October 2012, five of those lenses had been produced.

Due to its introduction of the Nikon Z-mount, Nikon discontinued the Nikon 1 line in 2018, including cancelling any future lens releases.

== See also ==
- Nikkor
  - Nikon S-mount
  - Nikon F-mount
  - Nikon Z-mount
- Image sensor format
  - Nikon CX format
- List of smallest mirrorless cameras

Class	2011		2012	2013	2014	2015	2016	2017	2018
High-end		1 V1		1 V2	1 V3 ^{AT}				Nikon Z
Mid-range		1 J1	1 J2	1 J3		1 J4 ^{T}	1 J5 ^{AT}		Nikon Z
Entry-level				1 S1		1 S2			Nikon Z
Rugged					1 AW1 ^{S}				Nikon Z
Class									
Class	2011		2012	2013	2014	2015	2016	2017	2018
