= Aptina =

Aptina Imaging Corporation
- Company type: Subsidiary
- Industry: Semiconductors
- Founded: 2008; 18 years ago
- Headquarters: San Jose, California, United States
- Number of locations: China, Finland, Germany, Japan, Korea, India, Norway, Singapore, Slovenia, Taiwan, United Kingdom
- Key people: Taner Ozcelik, Senior Vice President, Aptina Imaging Business of ON Semiconductor
- Products: CMOS image sensors, Image processors
- Number of employees: 650
- Parent: Onsemi
- Website: aptina.com

Aptina Imaging Corporation was a company that sold CMOS imaging products. Its CMOS sensors were used in the Nikon V1 (10.1 MP, CX format, 16.9x17.9 mm), Nikon J1, and Nikon V2. By 2009, Aptina had a 16% share of the CMOS image sensors market, with revenue estimated at $671 million. The company was acquired in 2014 by ON Semiconductor

== History ==
Aptina Imaging was created as a spin-off of Micron Technology's Image Sensor Division in March 2008. Aptina was still an independent division within Micron until July 2009, when Aptina became an independent, privately held company, being partially sold to a group including TPG and Riverwood Capital. ON Semiconductor Corporation completed the acquisition of Aptina Imaging in August 2014.

== Milestones ==
- 2014 – ON Semiconductor completes acquisition of Aptina Imaging
- 2014 – Aptina Imaging has bought color filter array processing and imager probe assets from Micron Technology, and close to 100 Micron employees will join Aptina's manufacturing facility in Nampa, Idaho on Aug. 4.
- 2011 – Shipped 2nd billionth sensor
- 2009 – Aptina spins out as an independent privately held company
- 2008 – Shipped 1 billionth sensor
- 2008 – Micron Technology launches Aptina: a CMOS image sensor division
- 2006 – Micron Imaging Group acquires Avago Technologies' image sensor business
- 1992–1995 – JPL team invented CMOS active pixel sensor technology

== Products ==
Predecessors of Aptinas products were CMOS image sensors of Photobit and Micron technology. Photobit was founded in 1995 and acquired by Micron in 2001, which started selling its own image sensors a year later. The first commercially available sensors of Photobit were the PB-159 in 1998 and the PB-100 in 1999. Micron showcased a 1.75-μm CMOS pixel sensor in 2005 and launched it in 2007. Micron also developed and built a prototype of a 1.4-μm CMOS pixel sensor by 2007.

The Nikon 1 series used Aptina sensors with dual conversion gain sensors, allowing users to choose from a mode with high dynamic range (DR) but low ISO, and a low light mode with low read noise but also less DR. In 2014 the company started offering a 1-Inch 4K Image Sensor for security and surveillance cameras.

== Awards ==
- 2011 – AET (China) Best Product Award Winner: AR0331
- 2010 – Winner, EDN Innovation Award: MT9H004
- 2009 – Finalist, EDN Innovation Award: MT9M033
- 2008 – Takayanagi Award: Presented to Dr. Junichi Nakamura
- 2008 – Best Supplier Award: Foxconn
