= Nikon 1 Nikkor VR 10-100mm f/4.5-5.6 PD-Zoom =

1 Nikkor VR 10-100 mm f/4.5-5.6 PD-Zoom
- Maker: Nikon

Technical data
- Type: Zoom
- Focal length: 10-100 mm
- Crop factor: 2.7
- Aperture (max/min): f/4.5-16
- Close focus distance: 0.3-0.85 m
- Max. magnification: 1:2.9
- Diaphragm blades: 7 (rounded)
- Construction: 21 elements in 14 groups

Features
- Ultrasonic motor: Yes Yes
- Lens-based stabilization: Yes Yes
- Macro capable: Yes Yes
- Application: Superzoom

Physical
- Weight: 515g
- Filter diameter: 72 mm

History
- Introduction: September 2011

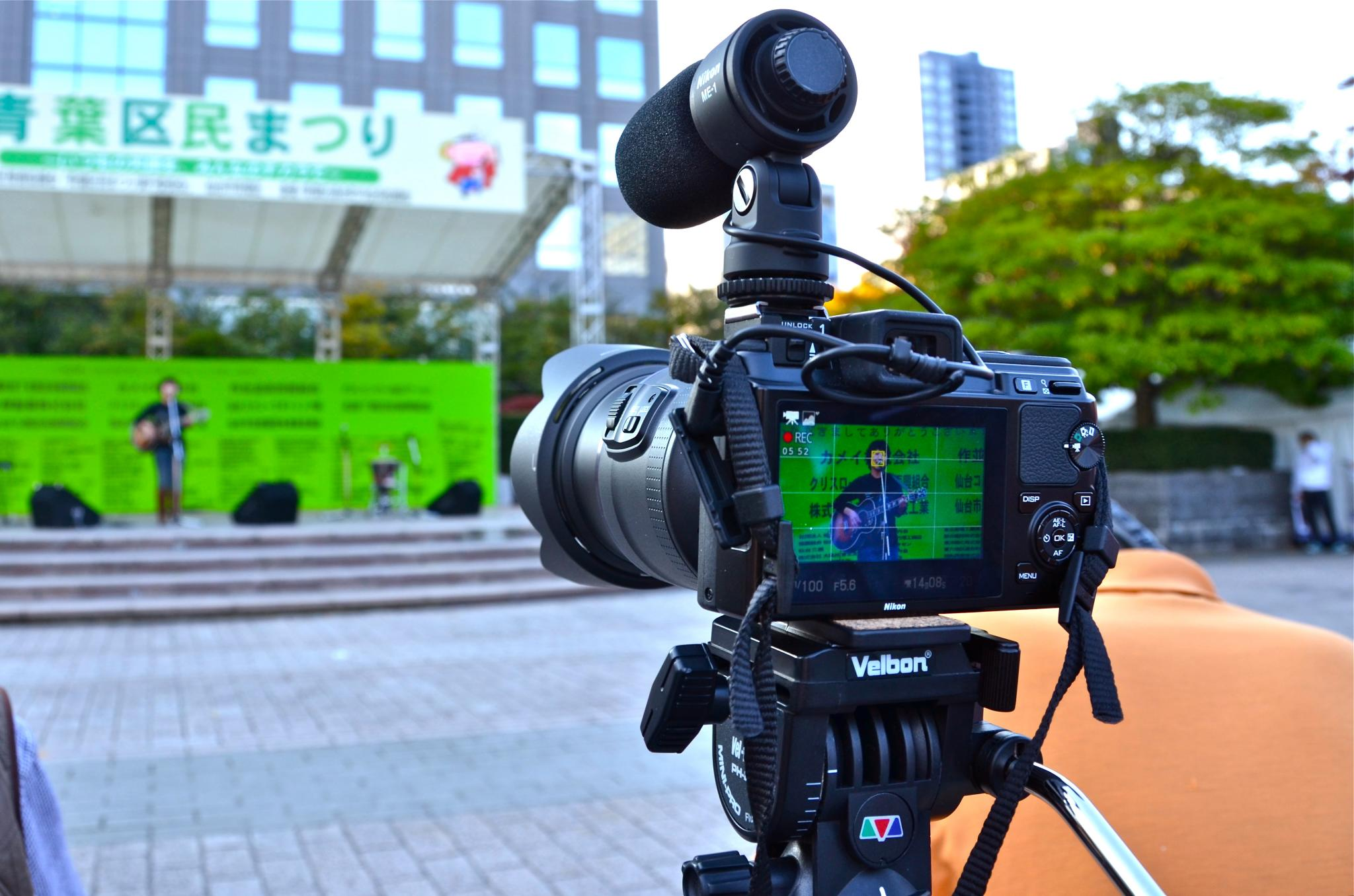
Nikon 1 V1 with Nikkor VR 10-100mm f/4.5-5.6 PD-Zoom and ME-1 stereo microphone in HD-video use

The Nikon 1 Nikkor VR 10-100 mm f/4.5-5.6 PD-Zoom for the 1 series' unique CX format (crop factor 2.7) is a superzoom lens manufactured by Nikon, introduced in September 2011 for use on Nikon CX format mirrorless interchangeable-lens cameras.

It integrates a number of technologies and has 21 elements in 14 groups, including: 1 High Refractive Index (HRI), 3 Extra-low Dispersion (ED) and 2 aspherical lenses, Super Integrated Coating (SIC), internal focusing (IF) with world's fastest quiet ultra-fast Voice Coil motor (VCM), silent 3-speed PD-Zoom, Vibration Reduction (VR II), retractable lens mechanism, and 7 rounded diaphragm blades.

Together with the Canon EF 28-300mm lens it is the only current superzoom with 20 elements or more. It does not feature a distance scale or an aperture ring.

== Performance ==
Several reviews state the extremely high speed without any noise and very high optical quality, especially excellent sharpness, exceeding many other products and being a positive exception compared to other superzooms. As disadvantages are mentioned its size, weight and price. It received very good valuations for photos, with additional advantages seen in the HD video area.

== See also ==
- Nikon 1 series
- Nikon CX format
- Nikon 1-mount
- List of Nikon compatible lenses with integrated autofocus-motor
- List of superzoom lenses
