= Nikon 1 AW1 =

2014 mirrorless interchangeable-lens camera

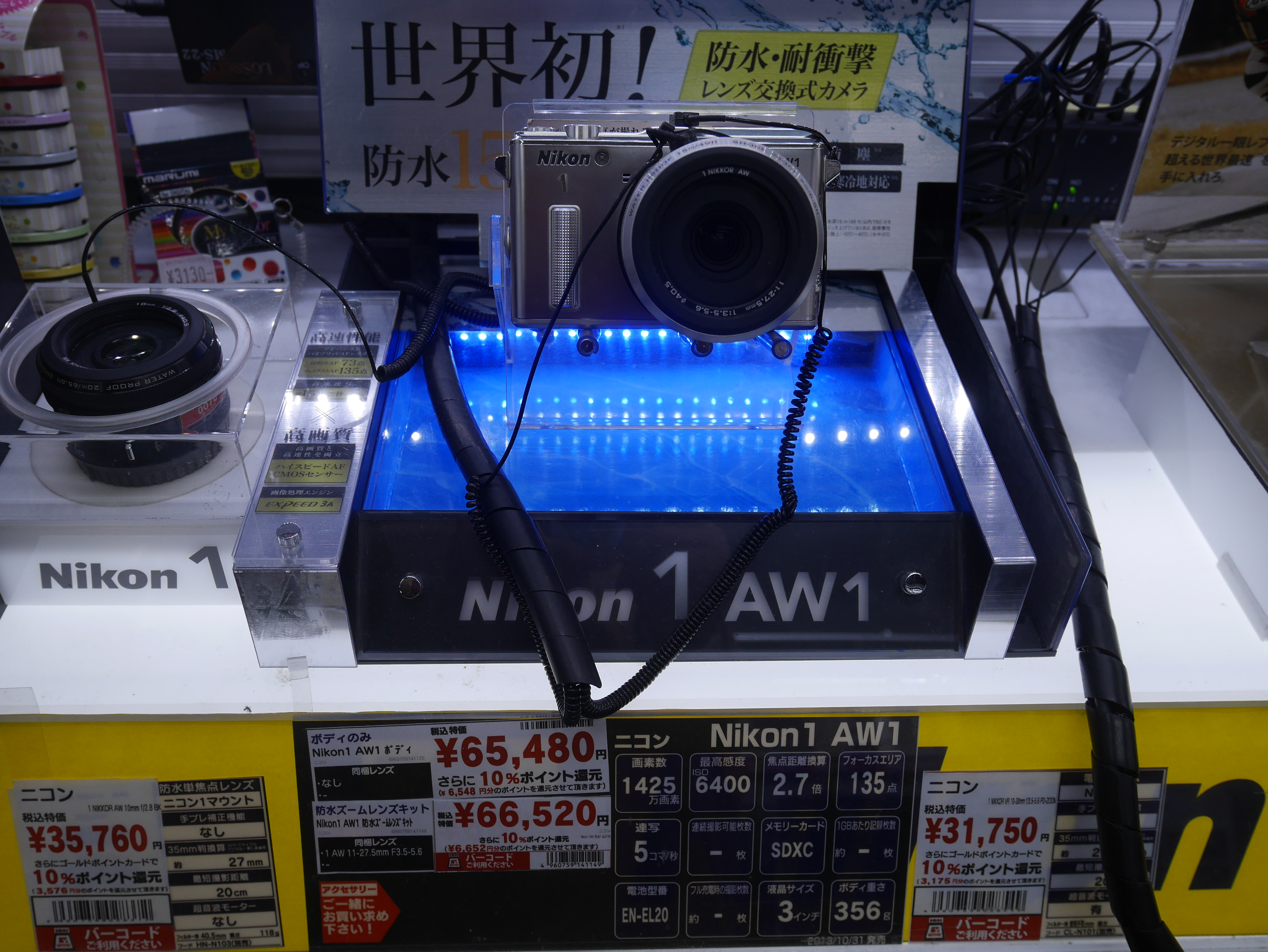

Overview
- Maker: Nikon
- Type: Mirrorless interchangeable lens camera
- Production: 2013-09-19 through 2018-07 (4 years 10 months)

Lens
- Lens mount: Nikon 1 mount

Sensor/medium
- Sensor type: CMOS
- Sensor size: 13.2 mm × 8.8 mm
- Maximum resolution: 4616 x 3077 (14.2 effective megapixels)
- Recording medium: SD, SDHC, SDXC. Also UHS-I and Eye-Fi (WLAN)

Image processing
- Image processor: EXPEED 3A

General
- Battery: EN-EL20 Lithium-ion
- Dimensions: 113.5×71.5×37 mm (4.47×2.81×1.46 in)
- Weight: 313 g (11.0 oz)

The Nikon 1 AW1 is a Nikon 1 series high-speed mirrorless interchangeable-lens camera by Nikon. It is a waterproof, rugged, high-speed MILC camera with 15 metres (49 ft) water pressure resistance, shockproof from 2 metres (6.6 ft), and freezeproof to −10 °C (14 °F). It was announced on September 19, 2013, together with two waterproof lenses: the 1 NIKKOR AW 10mm f/2.8 and the 1 NIKKOR AW 11-27.5mm f/3.5-5.6.

It has nearly the same features as the Nikon 1 J3, but with a heavier body and GPS added.

== Features list ==
- Effective Pixels: 14.2 million
- Sensor Size: 13.2mm x 8.8mm
- Image sensor format: CX
- Storage Media: SD, SDHC, SDXC (UHS-I)
- 15 frames per second with AF
- 30/60 fps with focus locked on first frame
- ISO Sensitivity: 160-6400
- Built-in GPS with compass, altimeter, and depth meter
- Audio file format: ACC
- Movie file format: MOV
- Monitor Size: 3.0 in. diagonal
- Monitor Type: TFT-LCD with brightness adjustment
- Battery: EN-EL20 Lithium-ion Battery

== Reviews and criticism ==
DPReview.com tested the camera extensively both on land and in the sea and noted that the camera had much better image quality than other "rugged cameras" tested. They also noted, however, that "one must be extremely careful, as just a few grains of sand can end the AW1's life ... and repairing or replacing it won't be cheap."

== See also ==
- Nikon 1 series
- Nikon 1-mount

Class	2011		2012	2013	2014	2015	2016	2017	2018
High-end		1 V1		1 V2	1 V3 ^{AT}				Nikon Z
Mid-range		1 J1	1 J2	1 J3		1 J4 ^{T}	1 J5 ^{AT}		Nikon Z
Entry-level				1 S1		1 S2			Nikon Z
Rugged					1 AW1 ^{S}				Nikon Z
Class									
Class	2011		2012	2013	2014	2015	2016	2017	2018
