= Donald Miralle =

American photographer

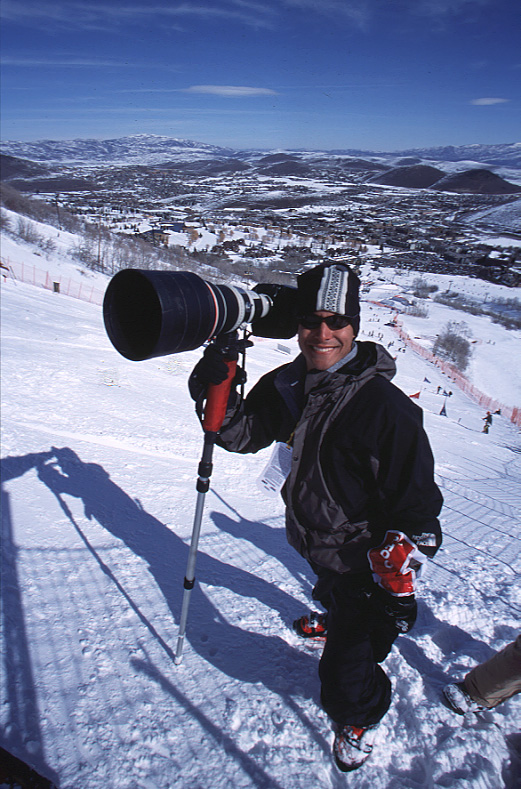
- Occupation: Photographer
- Website: Donald Miralle's Personal Website

Donald Miralle is a photographer, born in Los Angeles, California but residing in San Diego, CA. With more than 50 international awards, he is especially known for his sports photography imagery, as well as portraiture and landscape photography. He founded a photography group and studio in San Diego, California called Leucadia Photoworks.

== Early life ==
Miralle grew up in Los Angeles, and studied at the University of California, Los Angeles. Miralle was a competitive swimmer for the UCLA Bruins; but after the men's swimming team at UCLA was cut due to Title IX, he redirected his interests to art.

== Photography career ==
Upon graduating with a Bachelor of Arts degree, he landed an entry-level position with Allsport Photography in 1997. Miralle worked with Allsport through the company's 1998 merger with Getty Images, where as a senior staff photographer, he covered over 10 Super Bowls, 11 Olympic Games, three Pan American Games, The Masters, The Indianapolis 500, The World Series and other major sporting events worldwide.

After 10 years, Miralle resigned from his staff position at Getty Images to pursue a freelance career with editorial and commercial clients. He has worked on assignments for ESPN the Magazine, Sports Illustrated, Newsweek, The New York Times, Golf Digest, and Men's Journal. He has also shot commercially for Nike, Gatorade, Adidas, Visa, Toyota, Callaway, NFL Players Association and Discovery Channel. His work has appeared in magazines including Photo District News, National Geographic, British Journal of Photography, The Holland Times, and Top Magazine in Brazil, and on TV shows on ESPN and Today. He has been a keynote speaker at many events including the PDN PhotoPlus Expo, and Great White North Workshop, and is active with the education of photojournalism at colleges and workshops including Brooks Institute, Art Center College of Design, and Sportsshooter Academies. In addition, Miralle has been a judge for the National Press Photographers Best of Photojournalism 2009, Swedish Pictures of the Year 2007, the Wisconsin Press Photographers Association, and the Utah Press Photographers Association. In 2023, Miralle was awarded a prestigious Lucie Awards for Lifetime Accomplishment in Sports Photography at Carnegie Hall in New York City.

== Other interests ==
Miralle is also an accomplished paddleboarder with many wins to his name including the 2012 and 2013 Jay Moriarty Paddleboard race, and the 2012, 2013, and 2014 Watermans Challenge. He Won the Rock 2 Rock 22 Mile race from Catalina to Palos Verdes in both the Unlimited and Stock divisions. Miralle also crossed the 32 mile Catalina Channel 10 times in the Catalina Classic, finishing top 3 in both Unlimited Division with a 3rd in 2012 and in Stock with a 2nd in 2022. As a member of Team USA at 2023 France and 2024 Denmark ISA Paddleboard World Championships, Miralle became the oldest medalist at the Championships at the age of 50 with the 4th place copper medal and a 3rd place bronze medal. He is also one of a few ocean athletes who have successfully completed a solo crossing in both the prone and standup divisions of the Ka'iwi "Channel of Bones" during the Molokai to Oahu Paddleboard World Championships.

== Awards ==
- World Press Photo - World Press Photo Contest, Amsterdam The Netherlands, 2005, 2006, 2010, 2012, 2014.
- Pictures of the Year International - 2005, 2006, 2007, 2008, 2009, 2011, 2012, 2013, 2016.
- National Press Photographer's Association Best of Photojournalism Contest - 2005, 2006, 2007, 2008, 2011, 2012, 2014, 2016.
- Pro Football Hall of Fame Photo Contest- 2001, 2003, 2004, 2007, 2008.
- Graphis Photo Annual- Gold Award 2009.
- PX3, Prix de la Photographie Paris (Note: PX3 .)- 2009.
- Sasakawa World Sports Photography Contest- 2002.
- Mobius Awards (Note: Mobius awards "Mobius Awards -Acknowledging Creative Excellence Worldwide". Archived from the original on 2010-03-09..) Ad Campaign for the NFLPA in 2008.
- National Headliner Award- Sports Illustrated 2000.
- Sportsshooter Photographer of the year- 2004, 2005.
- The PGB Photo Award, Stockholm Sweden 2010.
- PDN "The Shot", NYC 2013.
