= Nikon 1 S1 =

2013 mirrorless interchangeable-lens camera

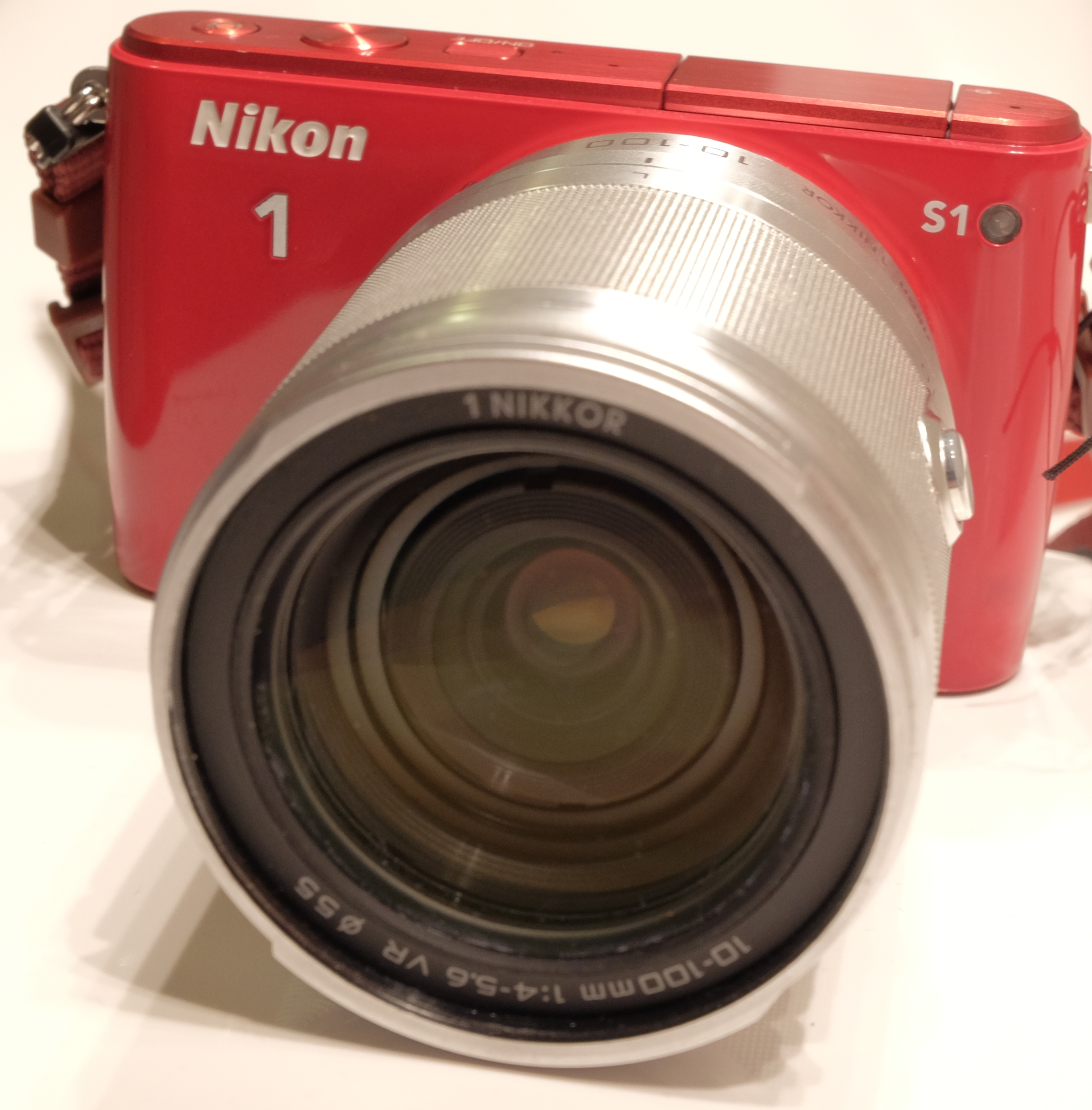

Overview
- Maker: Nikon
- Type: Mirrorless interchangeable lens camera
- Production: 2013-06-21 through 2014-06 (1 year)

Lens
- Lens mount: Nikon 1 mount

Sensor/medium
- Sensor type: CMOS
- Sensor size: 13.2 mm × 8.8 mm
- Maximum resolution: 3893 x 2595 (10.1 effective megapixels)
- Recording medium: SD, SDHC, SDXC. Also UHS-I and Eye-Fi (WLAN)

Image processing
- Image processor: EXPEED 3A

General
- Weight: 197 g (7 oz) (0.434 lb)

The Nikon 1 S1 is a Nikon 1 series low-cost high-speed mirrorless interchangeable-lens camera launched by Nikon on June 21, 2013. Nikon lists the estimated selling price of the Nikon 1 S1 One-Lens Kit in the United States at $499.95. This kit comes with the 1 NIKKOR 11–27.5mm f/3.5-5.6 lens. It features many similarities with the 1 J2, like the same 10.1 megapixel CX-format CMOS sensor and autofocus, but with an upgraded EXPEED 3A processor.

It is the predecessor of Nikon 1 S2 which the newer is a low-cost version of Nikon 1 J4, so has only 14.2MP sensor with less autofocusing points and no touch screen and WiFi, but still has 20fps burst mode as Nikon 1 J4.

== Features list ==
- Effective Pixels: 10.1 million
- Sensor Size: 13.2 mm x 8.8 mm
- Image sensor format: CX
- Storage Media: SD, SDHC, SDXC
- 15 frames per second with AF
- 30/60 fps with focus locked on first frame
- ISO Sensitivity: 100-6400
- Manual Exposure Settings (Shutter, Aperture, ISO)
- Audio file format: AAC
- Movie file format: MOV
- Monitor Size: 3.0 in. diagonal
- Monitor Type: TFT-LCD with brightness adjustment
- Battery: EN-EL20 Lithium-ion Battery
- Approx. Dimensions: 4.0 in. (102 mm) x 2.4 in. (60.5 mm) x 1.2 in. (29.7 mm)
- Approx. Weight: 6.9 oz. (197 g)

== See also ==
- Nikon 1 series
- Nikon 1-mount
- List of smallest mirrorless cameras

Class	2011		2012	2013	2014	2015	2016	2017	2018
High-end		1 V1		1 V2	1 V3 ^{AT}				Nikon Z
Mid-range		1 J1	1 J2	1 J3		1 J4 ^{T}	1 J5 ^{AT}		Nikon Z
Entry-level				1 S1		1 S2			Nikon Z
Rugged						1 AW1 ^{S}			Nikon Z
Class									
Class	2011		2012	2013	2014	2015	2016	2017	2018
