= Nikon 1 series =

Camera line by Nikon

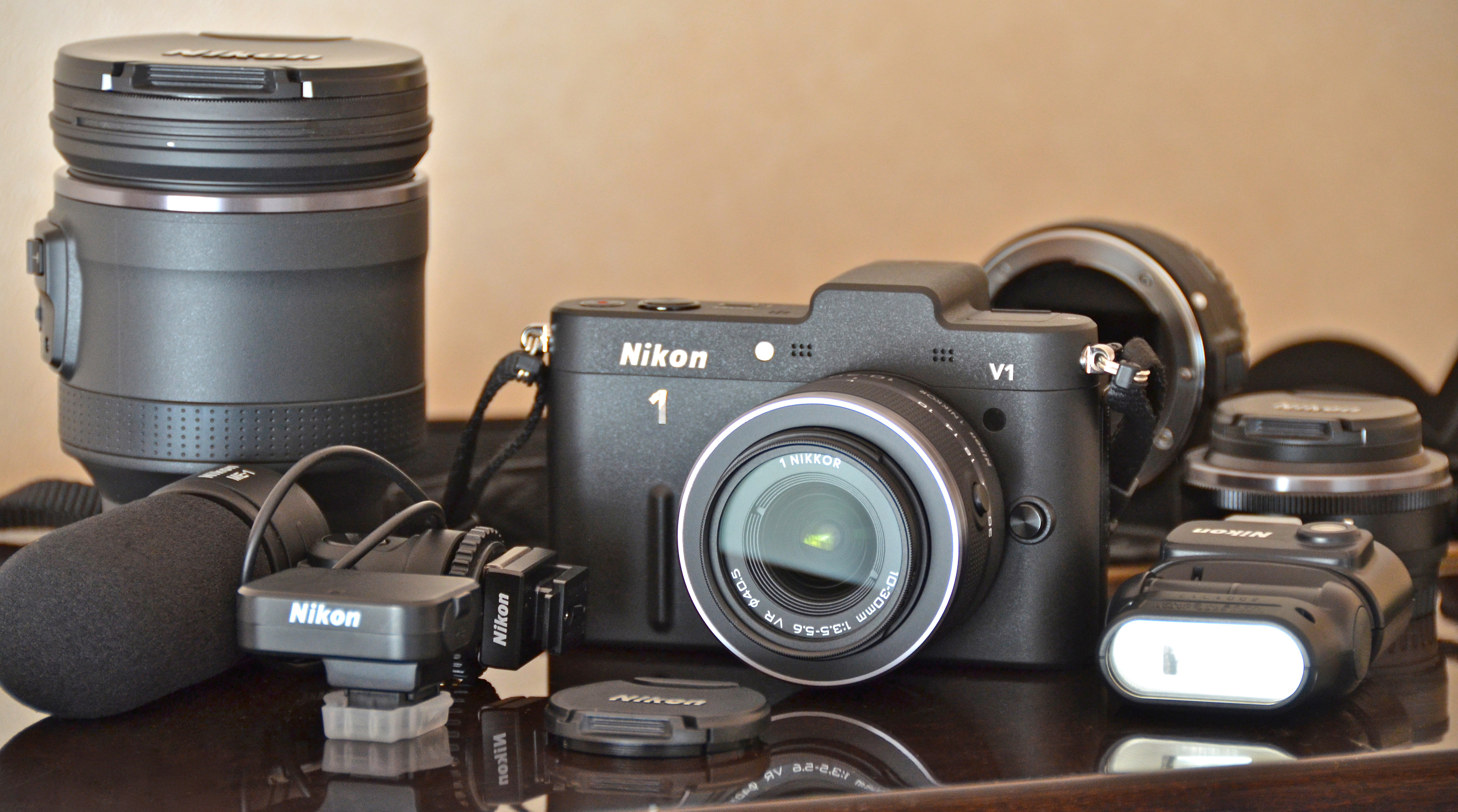
Nikon 1 V1 with Nikkor 10-30mm f/3.5-5.6 attached, the Nikkor VR 10-100mm f/4.5-5.6 PD-Zoom left, ME-1 stereo microphone, GPS GP-N100 and SB-N5 flash

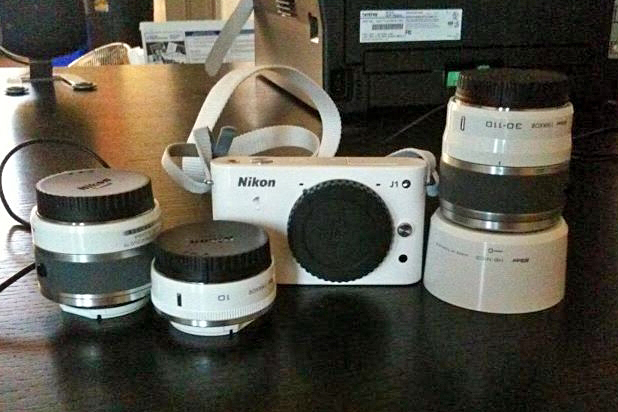
Nikon 1 J1 with Nikkor 10-30mm f/3.5-5.6, 10mm f/2.8 pancake, and the 30-110mm f/3.8-5.6 lens in white

The Nikon 1 series is a line of mirrorless interchangeable lens cameras from Nikon, originally announced on 21 September 2011. The cameras utilized Nikon 1-mount lenses, and featured 1" CX format sensors. The FT-1 adapter was available, which allowed Nikon 1 users to mount nearly all Nikon F-mount lenses, with significant limitations on non-autofocus lenses and autofocus lenses without an internal focusing motor.

When it was announced in 2011, Nikon released:

- the first two cameras (the J1 and V1)
- the first four lenses (the 1 NIKKOR VR 10-30mm f/3.5-5.6, 1 NIKKOR VR 30-110mm f/3.8-5.6, 1 NIKKOR 10mm f/2.8 and 1 NIKKOR VR 10-100mm f/4.5-5.6 PD-ZOOM)
- a lens adapter (the FT-1 converter) to accept F-mount lenses
- a flash unit (the SB-N5 Speedlight flash).

Nikon discontinued the Nikon 1 series in July 2018 and launched the mirrorless $\mathbb{Z}$-series cameras later that year, using full-frame sensors for its first two cameras and a new Nikon Z-mount line of lenses.

== Cameras ==
The series included the Nikon 1 V1, J1, J2, and S1 with a 10-megapixel image sensor, the V2, J3, S2 and AW1 with a 14-megapixel image sensor and further increased autofocus speed to 15 frames per second (fps), and the V3 and J4 with a new 18-megapixel image sensor, further increased autofocus speed to 20 fps, 120 fps HD slow-motion at 1280 x 720 and 1080/60p. The J5 model added a 20.8 MP sensor in 2015 and kept most other technical specifications the same as the J4 model.

At the time of announcement, Nikon claimed that the cameras featured the world's fastest autofocus, with 10 fps—even during videos—based on hybrid autofocus (phase detection/contrast-detect AF with AF-assist illuminator), as well as the world's fastest continuous shooting speed (60 fps) among all cameras with interchangeable lenses. Slow-motion movies can be captured in up to 1200 fps with reduced resolution. Its built-in intervalometer enables time-lapse photography.

List of Nikon 1 cameras
Model	Image	Rel date	MP (Note: All cameras have a base 3:2 aspect ratio.)	Expeed	Card slots (Note: All slots are UHS-I) (Note: SD includes support of SD, SDHC, SDXC cards.)	Video			LCD	EVF	Shutter		Focus points	ISO	Wi-Fi	Dimensions W×H×D	Wt. (Note: Camera body only.)	Ref
Model	Image	Rel date	MP	Expeed	Card slots	720	1080	4K	LCD	EVF	Mech. (Note: Mechanical shutter, speeds from 30–1/4000s in 1/3EV steps; flash sync at 1/250s.)	Elec. (Note: Electronic shutter, speeds from 30–1/16000s in 1/3EV steps; flash sync at 1/60s.)	Focus points	ISO	Wi-Fi	Dimensions W×H×D	Wt.	Ref
V Series – advanced cameras with EVFs
V1		2011-09-21	10.1	3	SD	60p	60i 30p	No	3.0" 921k dots	1440k-dot	Yes	Yes	135	100–3200	No	113×76×43.5 mm (4.4×3.0×1.7 in)	383 g (13.5 oz)	
V2		2012-10-24	14.2	3A	SD	60p 30p	60i 30p	No	3.0" 921k dots	1440k-dot	Yes	Yes	135	160–6400	WU-1b	107.8×81.6×45.9 mm (4.2×3.2×1.8 in)	337 g (11.9 oz)	
V3		2014-03-13	18.4	4A	microSD	60p 30p	60p 30p	No	3.0" 1037k dots	Opt., 1440k-dot	Yes	Yes	171	160–12800	Yes	110.9×65.0×33.2 mm (4.4×2.6×1.3 in)	324 g (11.4 oz)	
AW Series – all-weather camera
AW1		2013-09-19	14.2	3A	SD	60p 30p	60i 30p	No	3.0" 921k dots	No	No	Yes	135	160–6400	WU-1b	113.3×71.5×37.5 mm (4.5×2.8×1.5 in)	356 g (12.6 oz)	
J Series – for enthusiasts
J1		2011-09-21	10.1	3	SD	60p	60i 30p	No	3.0" 460k dots	No	No	Yes	135	100–3200	No	106.0×61.0×29.8 mm (4.2×2.4×1.2 in)	277 g (9.8 oz)	
J2		2012-08-09	10.1	3	SD	60p	60i 30p	No	3.0" 921k dots	No	No	Yes	135	100–3200	No	106.0×61.0×29.8 mm (4.2×2.4×1.2 in)	280 g (9.9 oz)	
J3		2013-01-08	14.2	3A	SD	60p 30p	60i 30p	No	3.0" 921k dots	No	No	Yes	135	160–6400	WU-1b	101.0×60.5×28.8 mm (4.0×2.4×1.1 in)	244 g (8.6 oz)	
J4		2014-04-10	18.4	4A	microSD	60p 30p	60p 30p	No	3.0" 1037k dots	No	No	Yes	171	200–12800	Yes	99.5×60.0×28.5 mm (3.9×2.4×1.1 in)	232 g (8.2 oz)	
J5		2015-04-02	20.8	5A	microSD	60p 30p	60p 30p	15p	3.0" 1037k dots	No	No	Yes	171	160–12800	Yes	98.3×59.7×31.5 mm (3.9×2.4×1.2 in)	265 g (9.3 oz)	
S Series – introduction to interchangeable lenses
S1		2013-01-08	10.1	3A	SD	60p 30p	60i 30p	No	3.0" 460k dots	No	No	Yes	135	100–6400	WU-1b	102.0×60.5×29.7 mm (4.0×2.4×1.2 in)	240 g (8.5 oz)	
S2		2014-05-14	14.2	4A	microSD	60p 30p	60p 30p	No	3.0" 1037k dots	No	No	Yes	135	200–12800	WU-1a	101.0×60.8×29.4 mm (4.0×2.4×1.2 in)	230 g (8.1 oz)	

=== New technologies ===
- Nikon CX format with 2.7 times crop factor. Although the image sensor area of 13.2 x 8.8mm is about half of the Micro Four Thirds system and a quarter of the Nikon DX format, it delivers a good performance for this small size, comparable to older Four-Thirds sensors like Olympus E-5, Olympus PEN E-P3, Panasonic Lumix DMC-G3 or older DSLRs like Nikon D40. The smaller sensor considerably increases the depth of field compared to a 35mm FX camera at the same angle of view and f-number.
- CMOS image sensor with integrated 73 phase detection sensors providing hybrid autofocus with both phase detection and 135-point contrast detect AF delivering what Nikon claimed to be fastest commercially available autofocus.

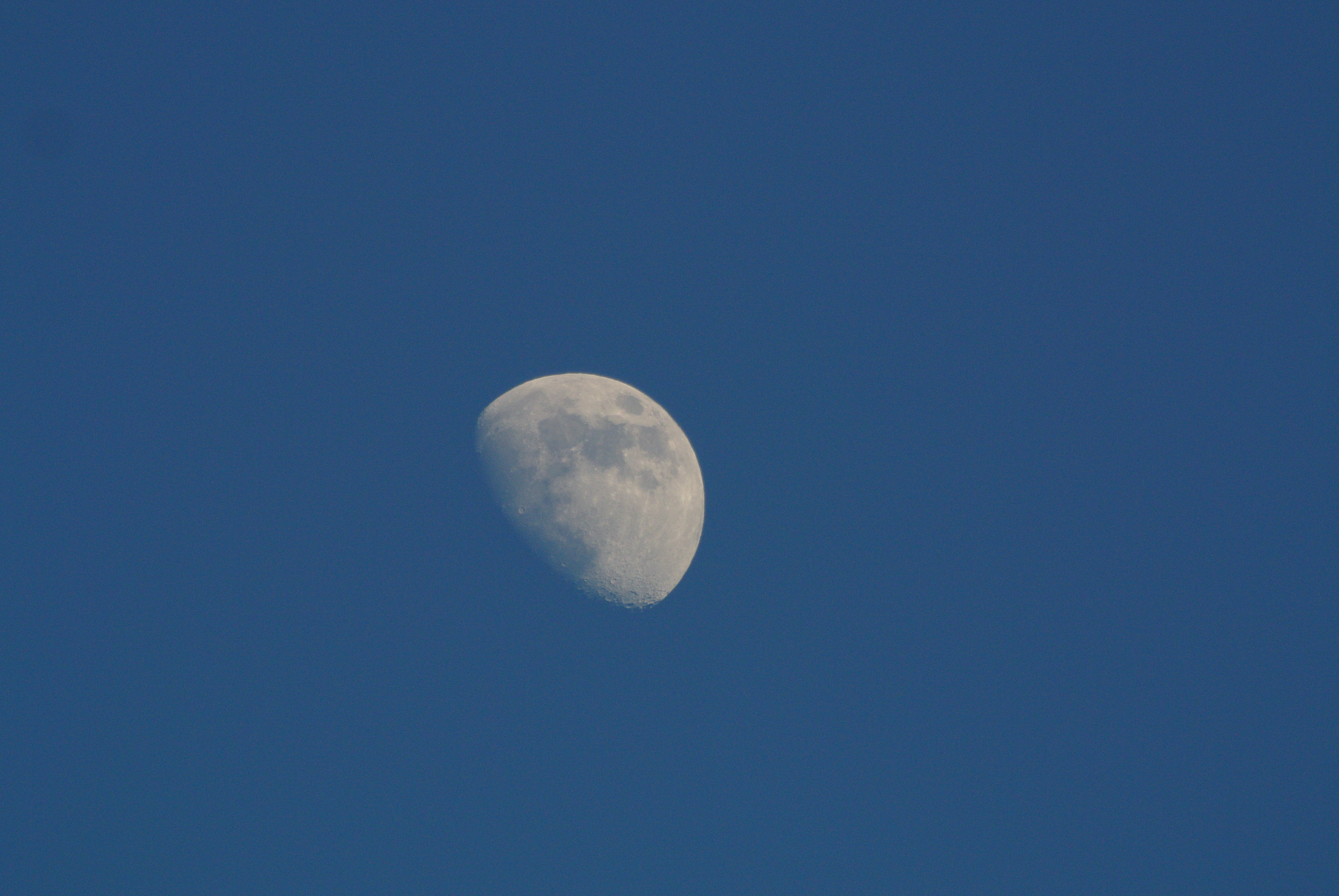
Nikon 1 V1 with FT-1 adapter and Nikkor AF-S 70-300mm f/4.5-5.6G VR gives 190-810mm

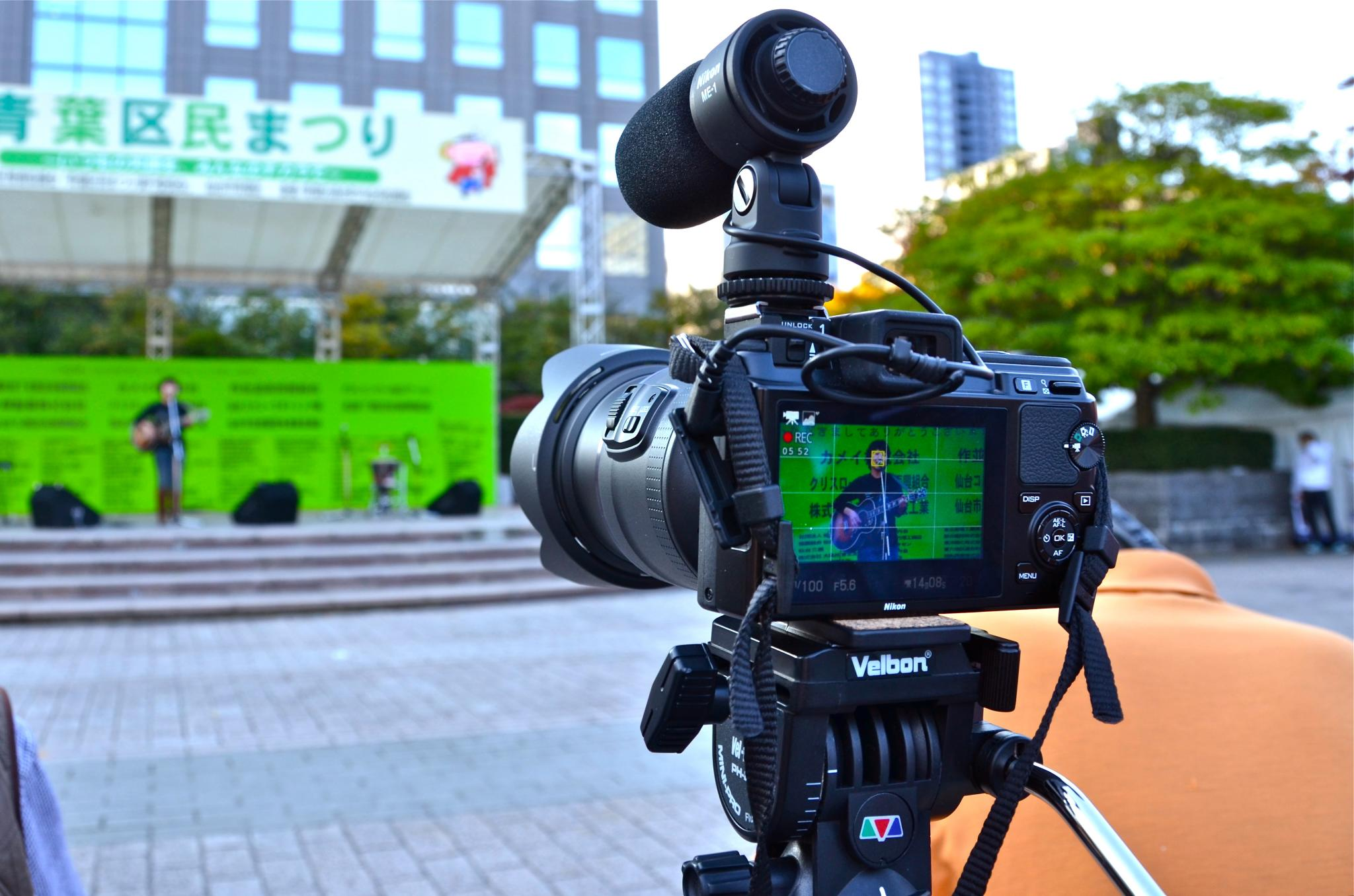
Nikon 1 V1 with Nikkor VR 10-100mm f/4.5-5.6 PD-Zoom and ME-1 stereo microphone in HD-video use

- F-mount to 1-mount adapter FT-1 enabling the use of all F-mount lenses especially with integrated autofocus motor. The FT-1 adapter mounts and meters with all AI-P, AF, AF-S, D and G lenses and compatibles providing autofocus with all lenses with integrated autofocus motor. It further mounts Pre-AI, AI, AI-S and E lenses without metering as well as lenses which jut out the F-mount (needing mirror lock-up on cameras with mirror). Although not recommended, it can be used with teleconverters for extreme telephotos.
- Lenses featuring Rear Focusing (RF) system with reduced moving masses and world's fastest extremely quiet Voice Coil motors (VCM) or Stepping (STM) motors to speed-up autofocus.
- 3-Speed silent Power-Drive motor zoom in the Nikkor VR 10-100mm f/4.5-5.6 PD-Zoom optimized for shooting HD movies.
- Nikon 1 Nikkor VR 10-100mm f/4.5-5.6 PD-Zoom integrates many technologies: 21 elements including 1 High Refractive Index (HRI, >2), 3 Extra-low Dispersion (ED) and 2 aspherical lenses, Super Integrated Coating (SIC), internal focusing (IF) with world's fastest quiet Voice Coil motor, 3-speed silent PD-Zoom, Vibration Reduction (VR II), retractable lens mechanism and 7 rounded diaphragm blades. Together with the Canon EF 28-300mm lens it is the only current superzoom with 20 elements or more.
- Fast electronic shutter (1/16 000) or additional electronically controlled mechanical focal-plane shutter.
- The V1 incorporates a 'multi accessory port' currently used for dedicated 1 Series flash and GPS units as well as AS-N1000 cold shoe adapter for mounting the ME-1 stereo microphone.
- High-speed dual multi-core image-processing pipelines with 600 megapixels per second speed using the Expeed 3 chip.
- Smart Photo Selector Mode enables selection of the best candidates out of a high-speed sequence.
- Advanced High-definition video recording allows uninterrupted filming while capturing high-resolution photos.
- Firmware updates of the Nikon 1 lenses are possible.

=== Other technologies ===
- As in all Nikon DSLRs with CMOS sensors, it integrates an active D-Lighting system, automatic correction of lateral chromatic aberration and vignetting.
- Autofocus modes include 3D subject-tracking, 41 points auto-area, manual focus and others.
- Built-in time-lapse photography intervalometer

== Lens system ==
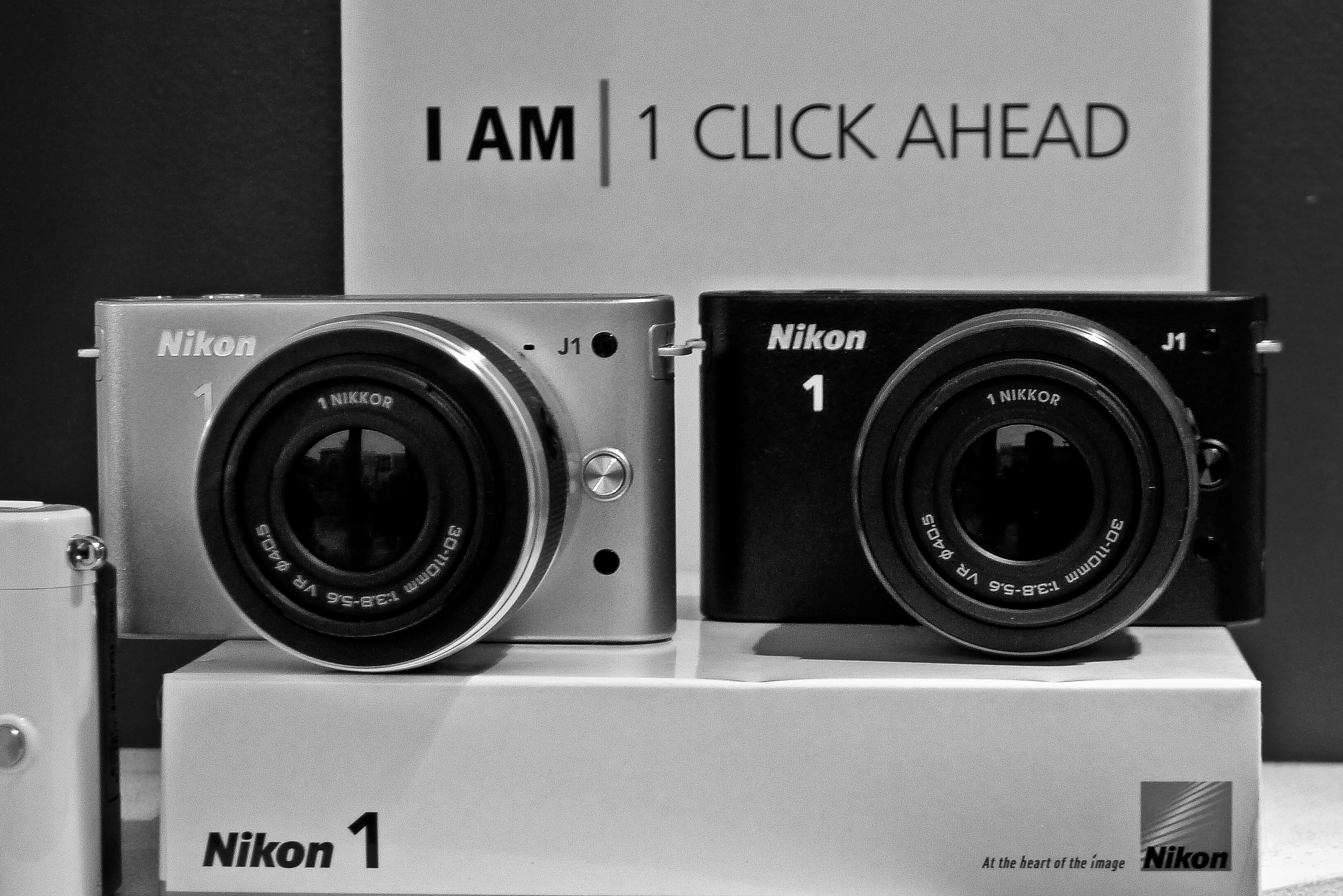
Nikon 1 J1

Nikon developed an entirely new system of lenses and the Nikon 1-mount lens mount for the Nikon 1 series. These lenses are only compatible with 1-mount cameras. Nikon had not debuted a new lens mount since the F-mount, which routine users of the Nikon D series are accustomed to. Although the F-mount adapter FT-1 enables the use of all F-mount compatible lenses, the native 1-mount lenses are meant to be portable and compact. There are 13 Nikkor lenses specifically built to fit the Nikon 1-mount in addition to several manual focus lenses from Samyang.

Every lens shown at the 2011 PDN PhotoPlus trade show (except the macro lens of unknown focal length) was eventually released before the system was discontinued.

- 1 Nikkor VR 6.7-13mm f/3.5-5.6
- 1 Nikkor 10mm f/2.8
- 1 Nikkor AW 10mm f/2.8
- 1 Nikkor VR 10-30mm f/3.5-5.6
- 1 Nikkor VR 10-30mm f/3.5-5.6 PD-Zoom
- 1 Nikkor VR 10-100mm f/4.5-5.6 PD-Zoom
- 1 Nikkor VR 10-100mm f/4.0-5.6
- 1 Nikkor 11–27.5mm f/3.5-5.6
- 1 Nikkor AW 11–27.5mm f/3.5-5.6
- 1 Nikkor 18.5mm f/1.8
- 1 Nikkor VR 30-110mm f/3.8-5.6
- 1 Nikkor 32mm f/1.2
- 1 Nikkor VR 70-300mm f/4.5-5.6

Focal length	35mm EFL and equivalent aperture	Angle of view	Design				Features			Filter size	Ref
Focal length	35mm EFL and equivalent aperture	Angle of view	Aperture	Const. (Note: Lens construction, elements / groups, with special features including: A: number of aspherical elements; ED: number of "extra-low dispersion" elements; HRI: number of "high refractive index" elements)	Size (Note: Listed as maximum diameter × length)	Weight	VR (Note: "Vibration reduction" (moving-element type optical image stabilization))	Blades (Note: Number of diaphragm blades)	Min. focus (Note: Minimum focusing distance)	Filter size	Ref
6.7–13mm	18–35mm f/9.5-15	100–63°	f/3.5–5.6 to 16	11e/7g	56.5×46 mm (2.22×1.81 in)	125 g (4.4 oz)	Yes	7	0.25 m (0.82 ft)	52mm	
10mm	27mm f/7.7	77°	f/2.8 to 11	6e/5g	55.5×22 mm (2.19×0.87 in)	77 g (2.7 oz)	No	7	0.2 m (0.66 ft)	40.5mm	
AW 10mm (Note: For Nikon 1 AW1 camera only)	27mm f/7.7	77°	f/2.8 to 11	6e/5g	61×30 mm (2.4×1.2 in)	118 g (4.2 oz)	No	7	0.2 m (0.66 ft)	40.5mm	
10–30mm	27–81mm f/9.5-15	77–29°40'	f/3.5–5.6 to 16	12e/9g	57.5×42 mm (2.26×1.65 in)	115 g (4.1 oz)	Yes	7	0.2 m (0.66 ft)	40.5mm	
10–30mm PD (Note: "Power Driven" zoom (motorized zoom feature))	27–81mm f/9.5-15	77–29°40'	f/3.5–5.6 to 16	9e/7g	58×28 mm (2.3×1.1 in)	85 g (3.0 oz)	Yes	7	0.2 m (0.66 ft)	none	
10–100mm	27–270mm f/10.8-15	77–9°10'	f/4–5.6 to 16	19e/12g	60.5×70.5 mm (2.38×2.78 in)	298 g (10.5 oz)	Yes	7	0.35–1.0 m (1.1–3.3 ft) (depending on focal length)	55mm	
10–100mm PD	27–270mm f/10.8-15	77–9°10'	f/4.5–5.6 to 16	21e/14g	77×95 mm (3.0×3.7 in)	530 g (19 oz)	Yes	7	0.3–0.85 m (0.98–2.79 ft) (depending on focal length)	72mm	
11–27.5mm	30–74mm f/9.5-15	72–32°20'	f/3.5–5.6 to 16	8e/6g	57.5×31 mm (2.26×1.22 in)	83 g (2.9 oz)	No	7	0.3 m (0.98 ft)	40.5mm	
AW 11–27.5mm	30–74mm f/9.5-15	72–32°20'	f/3.5–5.6 to 16	8e/6g	63×56.5 mm (2.48×2.22 in)	182 g (6.4 oz)	No	7	0.3 m (0.98 ft)	40.5mm	
18.5mm	50mm f/4.9	46°40	f/1.8 to 16	8e/6g	56×36 mm (2.2×1.4 in)	70 g (2.5 oz)	No	7	0.2 m (0.66 ft)	40.5mm	
30–110mm	81–297mm f/10.3-15	29°40'–8°20'	f/3.8–5.6 to 16	18e/12g	60×61 mm (2.4×2.4 in)	180 g (6.3 oz)	Yes	7	1.0 m (3.3 ft)	40.5mm	
32mm	86mm f/3.2	28°	f/1.2 to 16	9e/7g	65.5×47 mm (2.58×1.85 in)	235 g (8.3 oz)	No	7	0.45 m (1.5 ft)	52mm	
70–300mm	189–810mm f/12.2-15	13–3°	f/4.5–5.6 to 16	16e/10g	73×108 mm (2.9×4.3 in)	550 g (19 oz)	Yes	7	1.0–1.6 m (3.3–5.2 ft) (depends on focal length)	62mm	

== Accessories ==
Nikon presented at PDN PhotoPlus International Conference + Expo 2011 many forthcoming lenses, LED video and macro lights and video kits.

=== Speedlights ===
With the 1 series cameras having a non-standard hot shoe, the SB-N5 flashgun, which drew power from the camera itself, was made available when the series was first released.

Nikon 1 system Speedlight units
Name	Camera(s)	Bounce	Guide Number (Note: At ISO 100)	Duration (Note: At full power)	Covers	W×H×D	Wgt.	Notes	Ref
SB-N5	V1	Yes; 0–90° (V) / ±180° (H)	8.5 m (28 ft)	1/4000 s	?	50×70.5×40.5 mm (2.0×2.8×1.6 in)	70 g (2.5 oz)		
SB-N7	V-series	Yes; 0–120° (V)	18 m (59 ft)	1/1650 s	10 mm (6.7 mm with adapter)	57.4×68.4×62.3 mm (2.3×2.7×2.5 in)	115 g (4.1 oz)		
SB-N10	AW1 (Note: Can also mount on all cameras that can use the WP-N1, WP-N2 and WP-N3 Waterproof Housings)	No	28 m (92 ft)	?	80° (120° with adapter)	87×133×140 mm (3.4×5.2×5.5 in)	627 g (22.1 oz)	Waterproof to 100 m (330 ft)	
LD‑1000	All (Note: Only requires a tripod socket, which all 1-series cameras have)	No	65/130 lux	(Note: Does not have a flash duration because it is a continuous LED movie light rather than an electronic strobe flash)	±55°(V) × ±72°(H)	31.7×95.0×38.5 mm (1.2×3.7×1.5 in)	180 g (6.3 oz)		

=== Waterproof cases ===
As shown in the following table, three waterproof cases were made for the Nikon 1 series.

Nikon 1 system waterproof camera cases
Name	Cameras	Lens(es)	Max. depth	W×H×D	Wgt.	Ref
WP-N1	J1, J2	10–30mm	40 m (130 ft)	156.4×123.5×140.5 mm (6.2×4.9×5.5 in)	790 g (28 oz)	
WP-N2	J3, S1	10–30mm	40 m (130 ft)	156×116×128 mm (6.1×4.6×5.0 in)	750 g (26 oz)	
WP-N3	J4, S2	10–30mm 11–27.5mm	45 m (148 ft)	156.4×115.8×113.0 mm (6.2×4.6×4.4 in)	735 g (25.9 oz)	

=== Other accessories ===
Lens adapter
The FT-1 lens adapter allows many Nikon F-mount lenses to be used with a Nikon 1 series camera; the J5 has additional restrictions on compatibility. Autofocus is supported with AF-S lenses, and VR lenses support image stabilization. AF lenses without an internal motor are supported in manual focus mode, with a focus indicator available, and AI-type manual focus lenses are supported with limitations on metering and autoexposure modes.
GPS unit
The GP-N100 GPS unit, designed for the Nikon 1 V-series cameras (V1/V2/V3), attaches to the camera's multi-accessory port. It draws its power from the body and writes the current position to the file EXIF after the location has been acquired.
Diopter
The single-element N1-CL1 diopter attaches to lenses with a 40.5 mm filter thread and shortens the minimum focus distance. With the 10–30 mm lens, the minimum focus distance is 0.09 m (3.5 in), and with the 30–110 mm, the minimum focus distance is 0.24 m (9.4 in).
WiFi units
The WU-1a and WU-1b wireless adapters allow the user to download images directly from the camera to a smartphone or tablet connected wirelessly through 802.11b or 802.11g using WPA2-PSK security. It also allows the connected phone/tablet to act as a remote shutter release with some mode limitations.
- The WU-1a is compatible with the S2, along with some Nikon D-series DSLRs and advanced Coolpix cameras.
- The WU-1b is compatible with the AW1, J3, S1, and V2, in addition to the D600 and D610 DSLRs.

== Reception ==
Independent reviews and image comparisons at all ISO speeds in JPEG and additionally Raw are available. Both of the initially released 1 series cameras were criticized for having DSLR-like prices. DxO Labs awarded the J1 sensor an overall score of 56.

== See also ==
- Nikon 1-mount
- List of smallest mirrorless cameras

Class	2011		2012	2013	2014	2015	2016	2017	2018
High-end		1 V1		1 V2	1 V3 ^{AT}				Nikon Z
Mid-range		1 J1	1 J2	1 J3		1 J4 ^{T}	1 J5 ^{AT}		Nikon Z
Entry-level				1 S1		1 S2			Nikon Z
Rugged					1 AW1 ^{S}				Nikon Z
Class									
Class	2011		2012	2013	2014	2015	2016	2017	2018
