= Nikon 1 J1 =

2011 mirrorless interchangeable-lens camera

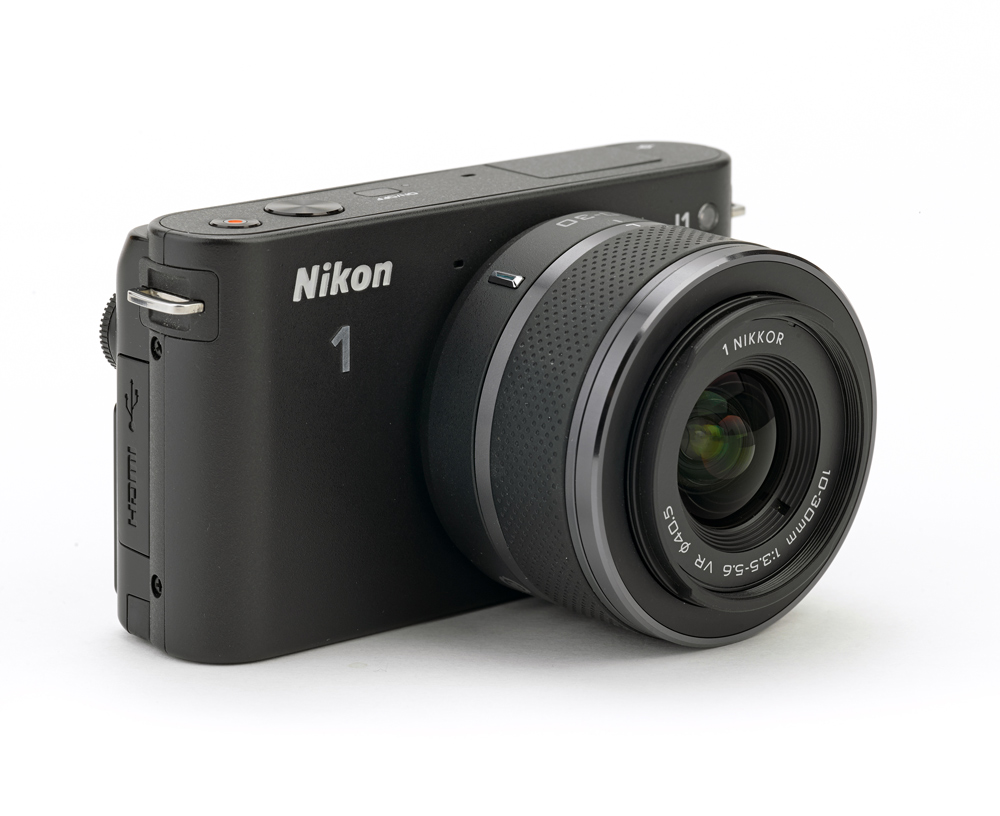
- A Nikon J1 with a 10-30mm lens

Overview
- Maker: Nikon
- Type: Mirrorless interchangeable lens camera

Lens
- Lens mount: Nikon 1 mount

Sensor/medium
- Sensor type: CMOS
- Sensor size: 13.2 mm × 8.8 mm (Nikon CX format)
- Maximum resolution: 10.1 megapixels
- Recording medium: SD, SDHC, SDXC, UHS-I and Eye-Fi (WLAN)

Focusing
- Focus: hybrid phase detection and contrast detection autofocus

Shutter
- Shutter speeds: 1/16,000-30s in steps of 1/3 EV; bulb; time

Image processing
- Image processor: EXPEED 3

General
- Video recording: H.264 / MP4, 1080p (29.97 fps), 720p (59.94 fps), 640x240 400 fps, 320x120 1200fps
- LCD screen: 7.5 cm
- Dimensions: 106.0 mm × 61.0 mm × 29.8 mm (4.17 in × 2.40 in × 1.17 in)
- Weight: 234 g (8 oz) (0.516 lb)

Chronology
- Successor: Nikon 1 J2

The Nikon 1 J1 was a Nikon 1 series high-speed mirrorless interchangeable-lens camera with 1" sensor size launched by Nikon on September 21, 2011, alongside the Nikon V1. It focused on high-performance, portability and versatility. Nikon listed the estimated selling price of the Nikon 1 J1 One-Lens Kit in the United States at $649.95. Released on October 20, 2011, this kit came with the 1 NIKKOR VR 10-30mm f/3.5-5.6 lens.

This camera integrates many new technologies and is designed for ease of use, sporting only four shooting modes: Still Images, Moving Images, Motion Snapshot and Smart Photo Selector and only two buttons for Power, Shutter and Record. Nikon 1 J1 has an all-new Nikon 1 lens mount, which has made lens changes simpler and quicker.

The successor is the Nikon 1 J2.

== Features ==
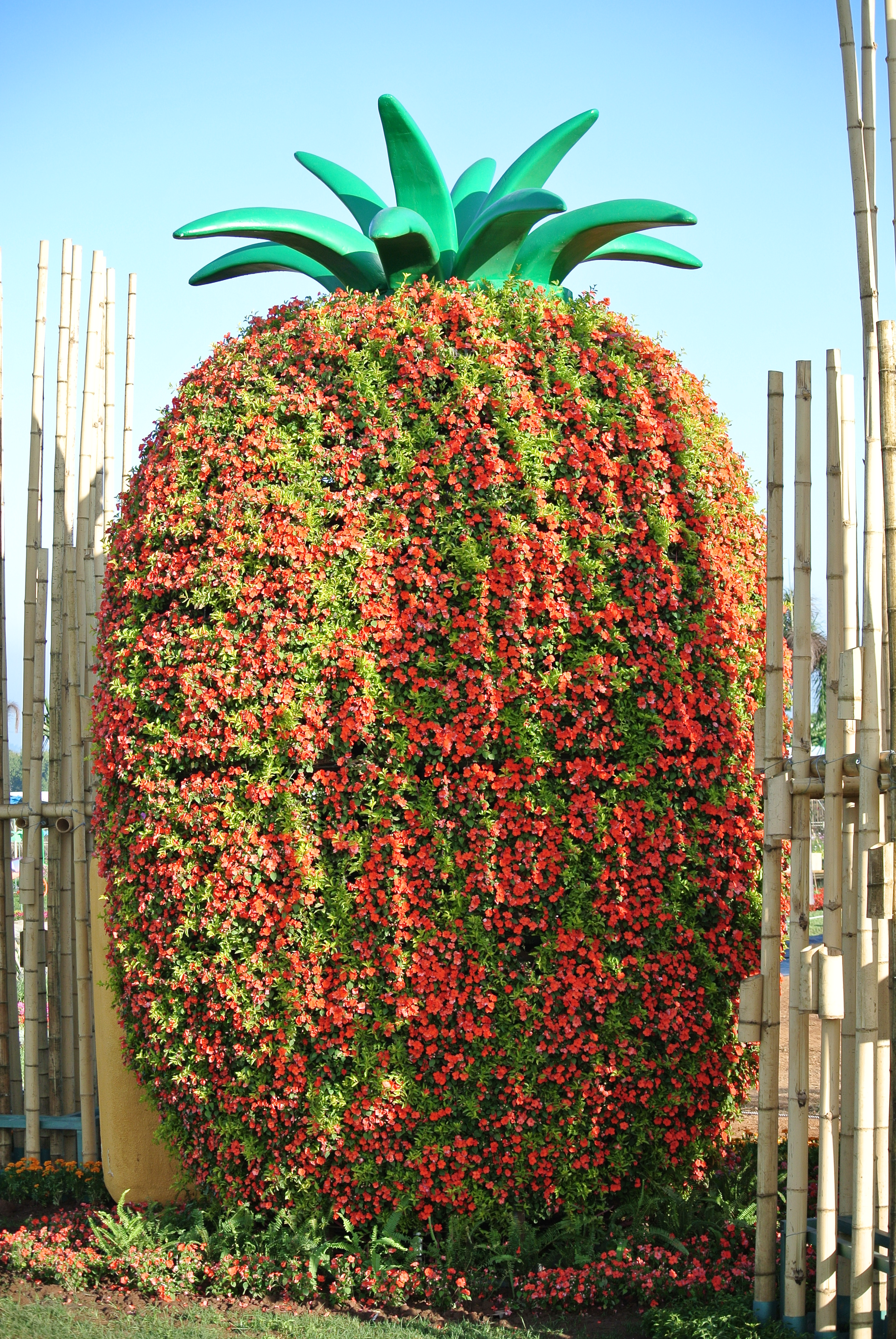
Photograph taken with Nikon 1 J1

The Nikon 1 J1 uses interchangeable Nikon 1 mount lenses. With its Nikon CX format sensor (2.7 crop factor), it provides a resolution of 10.1 megapixels.

The camera has 1080p Full HD movie capability, as well as slow motion movie that films at a speed of 400-1,200fps. While in movie mode, users can shoot photographs, as well. Videos have been tested and show to be sensitive to wind noise and will detect the sound of zoom on the lenses that allow this. While it does not produce the quality of true HD, it is still impressive. Slow-motion video has lower resolution than the HD option, and the quality is adequate for sites like YouTube.

=== Motion Snapshot ===
At the touch of the shutter, the camera takes a high-resolution still, plus a one-second movie vignette. Upon playback, this creates a motion series in slow motion, accompanied by music. This feature can be used to capture portrait, as well as landscape, photographs. This mode is really only interesting when used on the camera. Once uploaded to a computer, the video plays at normal speed and without the sound produced on the camera. The images and the video are saved as different files, but can be combined.

=== Auto-focus ===
The Nikon 1 J1 has a very effective autofocus system with a 73-point focal plane. The autofocus extensively and thoroughly monitors the subject and tracks it to ensure the elements are sharply preserved. It also automatically works to improve output in low-light situations. Reviewers say that Nikon stands behind its words and users agree that the Nikon 1 J1 has incredible speed when focusing in normal light, but when light levels drop, the speed of the focus differs. While still quicker than other models, it is slower than in good light conditions. The shutter lag time is equal to that of other cameras in the class and while AF acquisition time is slower than other cameras, it is still fairly quick.

=== Smart Photo Selector ===
Upon pressing the shutter, the camera takes 20 shots at 30fps. From those 20, the camera then selects the best 5, and from that reduces that selection to one for a final photo recommendation. The camera selects the best pictures based on criteria such as the subject being out of frame, out of focus, blurred or having its eyes closed. This is useful in situations where the user is photographing fast actions and quick moments.

=== Image processor ===
The Nikon 1 J1 used the EXPEED 3 processing engine, which was, at that time, Nikon's newest.

=== Scene Recognition Mode ===
This setting determines which mode the camera should capture the photograph in. Based on lighting, subject, scenery, and closeness. the camera will wutomatically select one of the following modes: portrait, landscape, close-up, and night portrait.

=== Picture Control ===
It allows users to retouch photographs in-camera, before uploading them to a computer or printing them. Users can choose from Standard, Neutral, Vivid, Monochrome, Portrait and Landscape.

=== D-Lighting ===
Active D-Lighting optimizes images regarding balanced shadows and high-lights. While users are able to adjust exposure settings, the camera will help to correct the images or can work on its own to correct images itself. Without D-lighting, most cameras will determine lighting based on one section of the photo, which can drastically distort lighting and make the photograph appear dark and lifeless. With Active D-lighting, the Nikon 1 J1 corrects the exposure based on lighting in the entire frame and creates more lively and vivid images.

== Reception ==
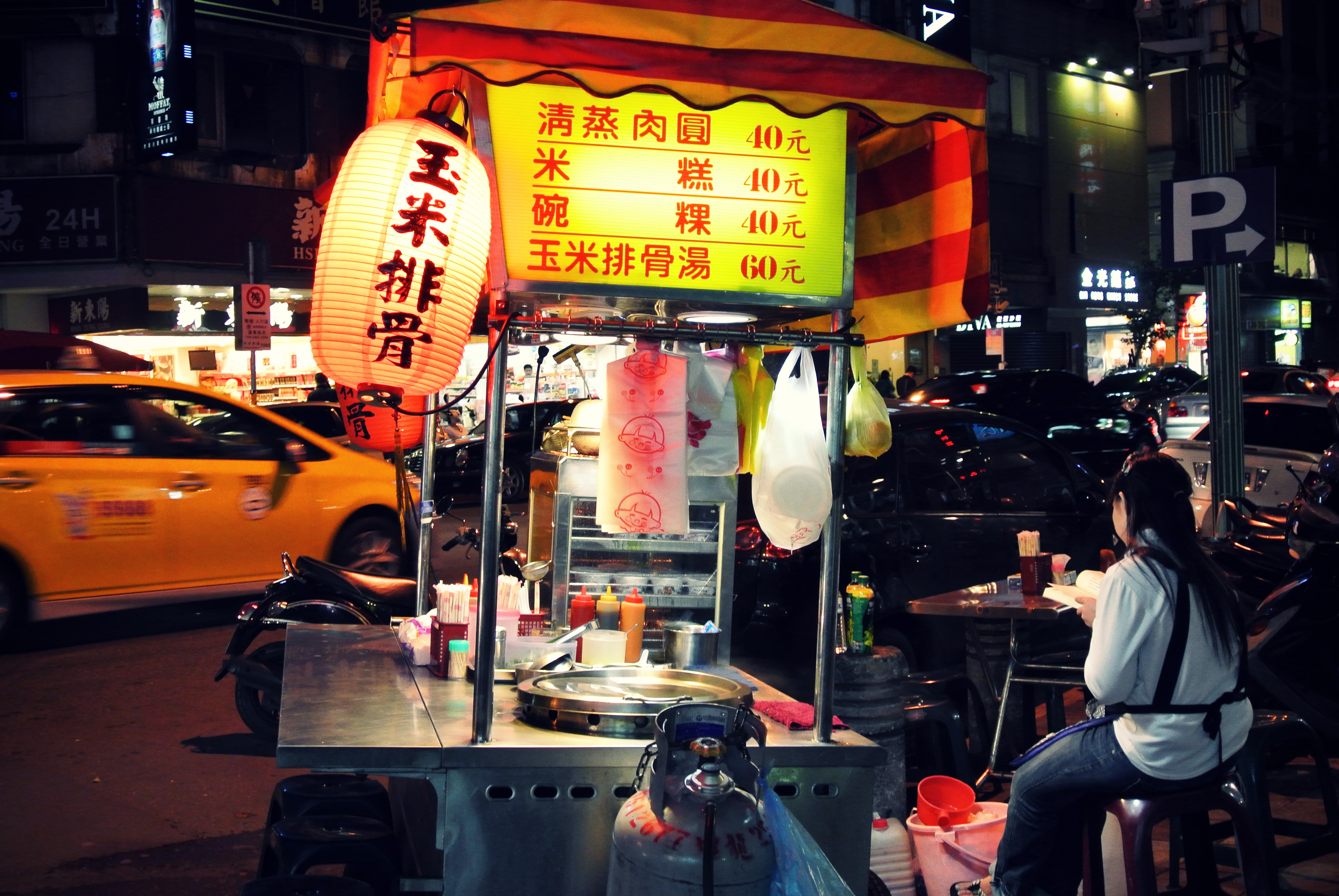
Photograph taken with Nikon 1 J1

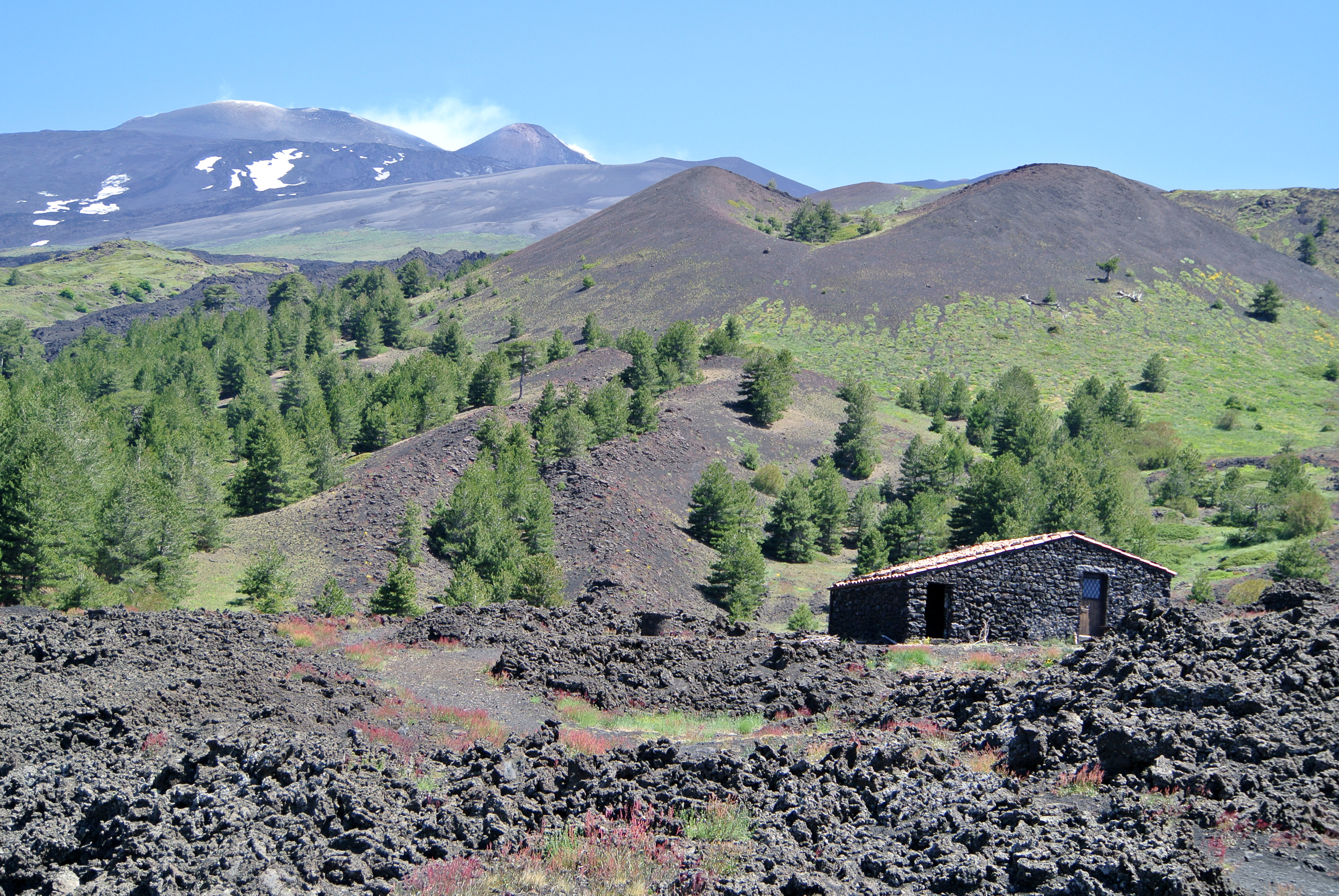
Landscape photograph (Mount Etna, Sicily) taken with Nikon 1 J1

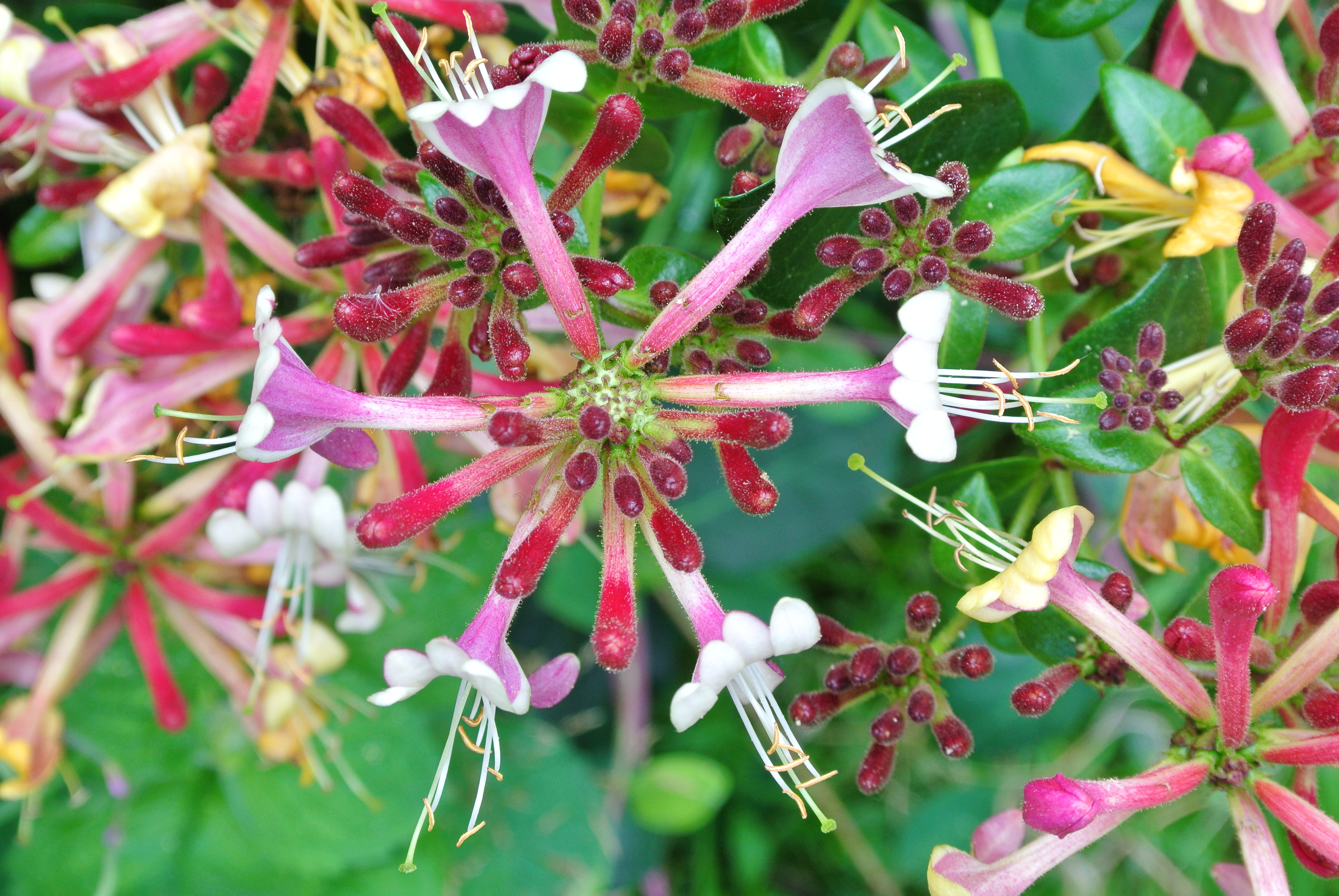
Macro close up of Honeysuckle taken with Nikon 1 J1 and 10-30mm zoom lens

Since its release in October 2011, there have been many reviews of the Nikon 1 J1. PCWorld gave the camera a positive review mentioning only minor drawbacks, such as the camera not coming with a user manual and not having external flash (although cameras exported since February 2012 now come with a User Manual on both print and CD as standard). When compared to photographs from a Nikon D3, the J1 held its own, exhibiting perfect exposure and vibrant colors. They also state the flash does not live up to expected standards and users need to increase the intensity when using it from a distance. The lens also locks easily and can become a hassle when trying to smoothly take photographs, but is fine once the user gets the hang of it.

Photography blog has reviewed the camera and has generally good things to say. They do note the peculiar layout of the dials and buttons on the back of the camera. They offer that the dial should have more options on it, rather than forcing the user to delve into menus to get to settings that would normally appear on the setting dial. They also point out that because the lenses for this camera do not have manual focusing rings, the manual focus that the camera does have is rudimentary at best. According to the review, it lags in wake-up time from sleep mode, picture review right after taking a picture is too long and its lack of ports make it uncompatible with other Nikon 1 accessories.

TechRadar.com mentioned that the 10 megapixel camera was slightly lagging because of its boundaries on sensor resolution. Nikon believes that 12 megapixels is enough for its full-frame cameras, making the 10 megapixel appeal of this camera a slight drawback when considering the potential of this camera.

Digital Camera Review says that the camera is good overall, but not a must-have for enthusiasts and Nikon fans. In the article it is stated that the J1 and V1 are not meant to replace DSLRs but are meant for users who wish to take pictures at any moment without having to resort to many lenses and a large-bodied DSLR. The review advises users to have a spare battery on hand for a full day of shooting and be wary when the battery indicator gets to a single segment. They also mention that cost and lack of viewfinder is a major drawback for this camera.

== Standard Features List ==
- Nikon's 10 megapixel Nikon CX format CMOS Sensor
  - 2.7x crop factor
- Nikon's EXPEED 3 image processor
- Nikon 1 mount lenses
- Active D-Lighting
- Built-in time-lapse photography intervalometer
- File formats: JPEG, NEF (Nikon's RAW, 12-bit compressed)
- In-camera Picture Control in 8 formats
- 3.0-inch LCD viewfinder and electronic shutter
- Built-in flash using i-TTL flash control using image sensor available
- 7 different shutter release modes
- Exposure modes in 6 different settings
- 5 easy-to-use scene modes
- shutter speed: 30 to 1/16000th seconds
- ISO sensitivity from 100-3200 (6400)
- White balance and movie metering
- Movie-mode in 1080p and slow-motion movie in 400fps & 1200fps (5 seconds, reduced resolution)
- Weight: 8.4 ounces (240 g) without lens
- EN-EL20 Lithium-ion Battery with AC adapter and power supply connector, battery life (shots per charge) approx. 230 shots (CIPA)

== Accessories ==
Accessories for the Nikon 1 J1 include:

- HB-N102/103 Lens Hood, LC-N40.5 Front Lens Cap, LF-N1000 Rear Lens Cap, LC-72 Snap-On Front Lens Cap 72mm, NC 40.5 Neutral Color 40.5 mm filter, and soft lens case.
- TA-N100 Tripod Adapter, FT-1 Mount Adaptor, ML-L3 Wireless Remote Control (Infrared) and CB-N2000 Leather Body Case (colors available)
- BF-N1000 Body Cap
- CB-N2000SA Black Leather Body Case Set (colors available)

== See also ==
- Nikon 1 series
- Nikon 1-mount
- List of smallest mirrorless cameras

Class	2011		2012	2013	2014	2015	2016	2017	2018
High-end		1 V1		1 V2	1 V3 ^{AT}				Nikon Z
Mid-range		1 J1	1 J2	1 J3		1 J4 ^{T}	1 J5 ^{AT}		Nikon Z
Entry-level				1 S1		1 S2			Nikon Z
Rugged					1 AW1 ^{S}				Nikon Z
Class									
Class	2011		2012	2013	2014	2015	2016	2017	2018
