= Nikon 1 V3 =

2014 mirrorless interchangeable-lens camera

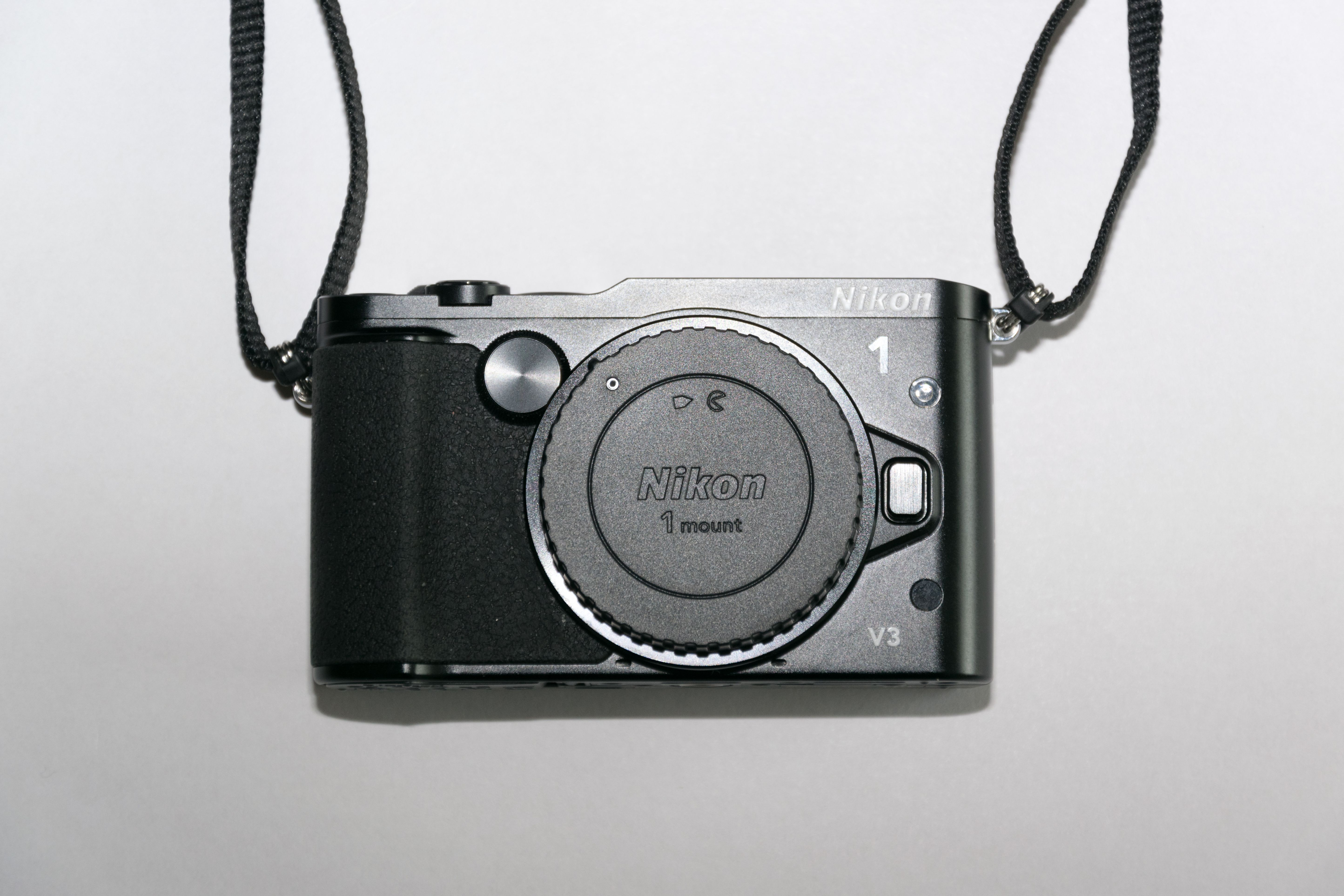

Overview
- Maker: Nikon
- Type: Mirrorless interchangeable lens camera

Lens
- Lens mount: Nikon 1 mount

Sensor/medium
- Sensor type: CMOS
- Sensor size: 13.2 x 8.8mm (1 inch type)
- Maximum resolution: 5232 x 3488 (18.4 effective megapixels)
- Film speed: 160-12800
- Recording medium: microSD/SDHC/SDXC

Focusing
- Focus areas: 171 focus points

Shutter
- Shutter speeds: 1/16000s to 30s
- Continuous shooting: 60 frames per second

Image processing
- Image processor: Expeed 4A
- White balance: Yes

General
- LCD screen: 3 inches with 1,037,000 dots
- Battery: EN-EL20a
- Dimensions: 111 x 65 x 33mm (4.37 x 2.56 x 1.3 inches)
- Weight: 381 g (13 oz) including battery

The Nikon 1 V3 is a digital mirrorless camera announced by Nikon on March 13, 2014.

Compared to its predecessor, the Nikon 1 V2, it has a higher resolution sensor (18 megapixels, up from 14 megapixels), built-in Wifi, FullHD video at 60 frames per second (non-interpolated), up to 120 frames per second video at 720p resolution, 20fps continuous AF, and 171 focus points, which Nikon claims gives better tracking autofocus than even DSLR cameras.

== See also ==
- Nikon 1 series
- Nikon 1-mount

Class	2011		2012	2013	2014	2015	2016	2017	2018
High-end		1 V1		1 V2	1 V3 ^{AT}				Nikon Z
Mid-range		1 J1	1 J2	1 J3		1 J4 ^{T}	1 J5 ^{AT}		Nikon Z
Entry-level				1 S1		1 S2			Nikon Z
Rugged						1 AW1 ^{S}			Nikon Z
Class									
Class	2011		2012	2013	2014	2015	2016	2017	2018
