= Nikon 1 J5 =

2015 mirrorless interchangeable-lens camera

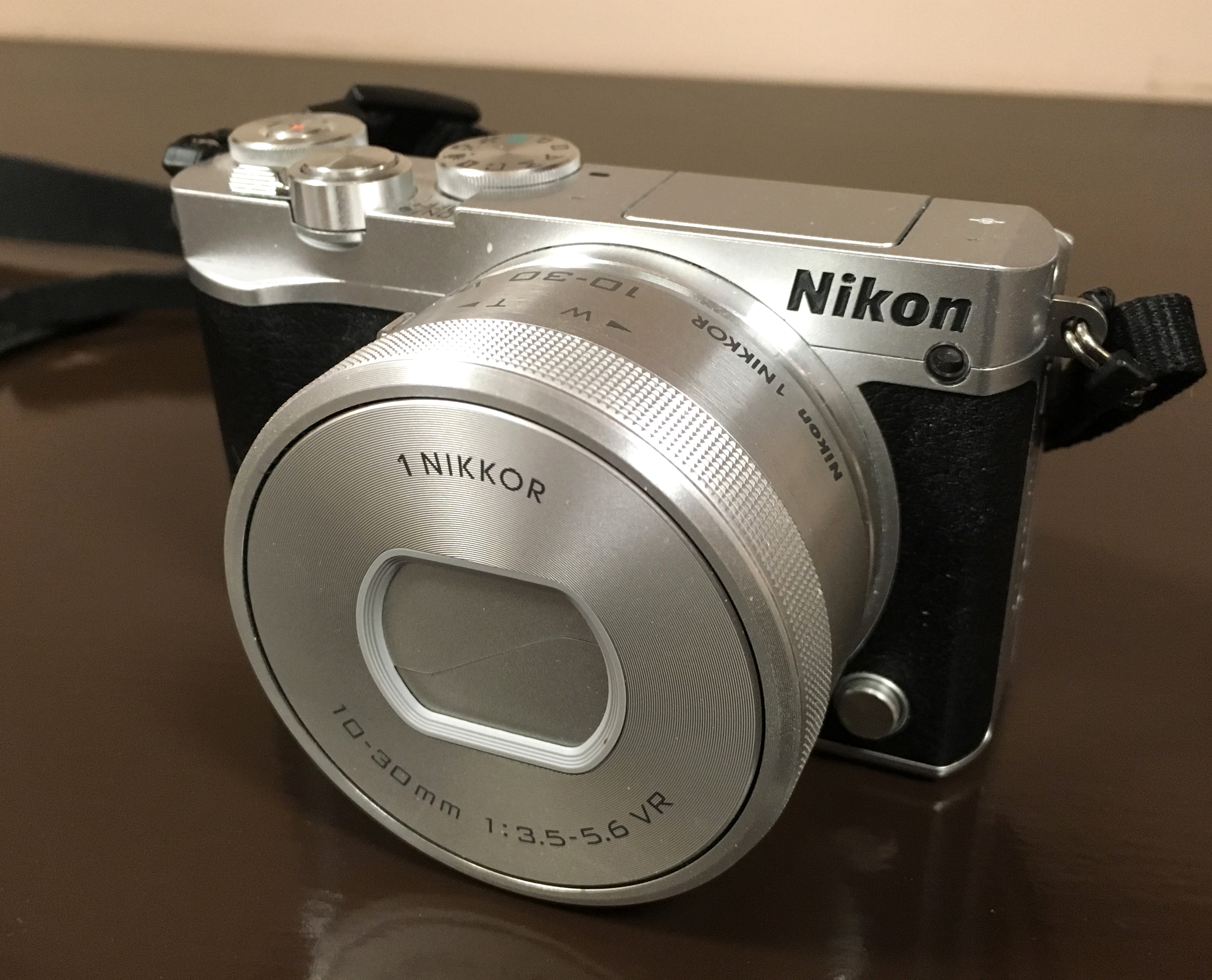

Overview
- Maker: Nikon
- Type: Mirrorless interchangeable lens camera

Lens
- Lens mount: Nikon 1 mount

Sensor/medium
- Sensor type: BSI-CMOS
- Sensor size: 13.2 x 8.8mm (1 inch type)
- Maximum resolution: 5568 x 3712 (20.8 effective megapixels)
- Recording medium: microSD memory card

Focusing
- Focus: Hybrid autofocus (AF) system
- Focus areas: 171 focus points

Shutter
- Shutter speeds: 1/16000s to 30s
- Continuous shooting: 60 frames per second

Image processing
- Image processor: Expeed 5A
- White balance: Yes

General
- LCD screen: 3 inches with 1,037,000 dots
- Dimensions: 98 x 60 x 32mm (3.86 x 2.36 x 1.26 inches)
- Weight: 231 g (8 oz) including battery
- Latest firmware: 1.01 / 25 April 2017; 9 years ago

Chronology
- Predecessor: Nikon 1 J4

The Nikon 1 J5 is a mirrorless interchangeable-lens digital camera produced by Nikon. It was announced on April 2, 2015, and was the last of the Nikon 1 series. The camera features a 20.8-megapixel CX-format backside-illuminated CMOS image sensor and is powered by the EXPEED 5A image processor.

The Nikon 1 J5 employs a hybrid autofocus system combining phase-detection and contrast-detection autofocus. It is capable of continuous shooting at up to 20 frames per second with autofocus and up to 60 frames per second with focus locked. The camera supports 4K UHD video recording at 15 frames per second and Full HD video recording at higher frame rates.

The camera is equipped with a tilting rear LCD monitor and supports only electronic shutter operation. It uses the Nikon 1 lens mount and is powered by the EN-EL24 rechargeable lithium-ion battery. Images and video are stored on microSD memory cards.

== Features ==
The Nikon 1 J5 features a 20.8-megapixel CX-format backside-illuminated (BSI) CMOS image sensor with an effective sensor size of approximately 13.2 × 8.8 mm. The use of a BSI design improves light-gathering efficiency compared to previous Nikon 1 models. Image processing is handled by the EXPEED 5A image processor, which provides faster processing speed, improved noise reduction, and enhanced video capabilities.

The camera uses the Nikon 1 lens mount and is compatible with Nikon 1 series interchangeable lenses. When used with an optional FT1 mount adapter, the camera can also accept Nikon F-mount lenses with certain functional limitations. Autofocus operation is based on a hybrid autofocus system that combines phase-detection autofocus points embedded on the image sensor with contrast-detection autofocus. This system enables fast autofocus acquisition and subject tracking during still photography and video recording.

The Nikon 1 J5 supports high-speed continuous shooting. It is capable of shooting at up to 20 frames per second with continuous autofocus and auto exposure, and up to 60 frames per second with focus and exposure locked on the first frame. These shooting modes are designed for capturing fast-moving subjects and action sequences.

Video recording capabilities include 4K UHD video recording at a resolution of 3840 × 2160 pixels at 15 frames per second. The camera also supports Full HD (1920 × 1080) video recording at higher frame rates, allowing for slow-motion playback. Video recording is performed using the electronic shutter, and audio is recorded via a built-in microphone.

The camera is equipped with a rear liquid crystal display (LCD) monitor that tilts upward and downward, allowing for shooting at high, low, and front-facing angles. The display is used for live view composition, image playback, and menu navigation. The Nikon 1 J5 does not include a built-in electronic viewfinder.

The Nikon 1 J5 uses an electronic shutter and does not include a mechanical shutter. It offers a range of selectable shutter speeds suitable for various lighting conditions. Exposure control modes include programmed auto, shutter-priority auto, aperture-priority auto, and manual exposure. The camera also supports a range of ISO sensitivity settings for still photography and video recording.

Wireless connectivity is built into the camera, allowing image transfer and remote camera control through compatible mobile devices using Nikon software applications. Still images and video files are stored on a microSD memory card.

Power is supplied by the EN-EL24 rechargeable lithium-ion battery. The camera body is compact and lightweight, reflecting its positioning within the Nikon 1 series as a small mirrorless interchangeable-lens camera emphasizing speed and portability.

== See also ==
- Nikon 1 series
- Nikon 1-mount
- List of smallest mirrorless cameras

| Class | 2011 | | 2012 | 2013 | 2014 | 2015 | 2016 | 2017 | 2018 |
| High-end | | 1 V1 | | 1 V2 | 1 V3 ^{AT} | | | | Nikon Z |
| Mid-range | | 1 J1 | 1 J2 | 1 J3 | | 1 J4 ^{T} | 1 J5 ^{AT} | | Nikon Z |
| Entry-level | | | | 1 S1 | | 1 S2 | | | Nikon Z |
| Rugged | | | | | 1 AW1 ^{S} | | | | Nikon Z |
| Class | | | | | | | | | |
| Class | 2011 | | 2012 | 2013 | 2014 | 2015 | 2016 | 2017 | 2018 |
