= Nikon 1 V1 =

2011 mirrorless interchangeable-lens camera

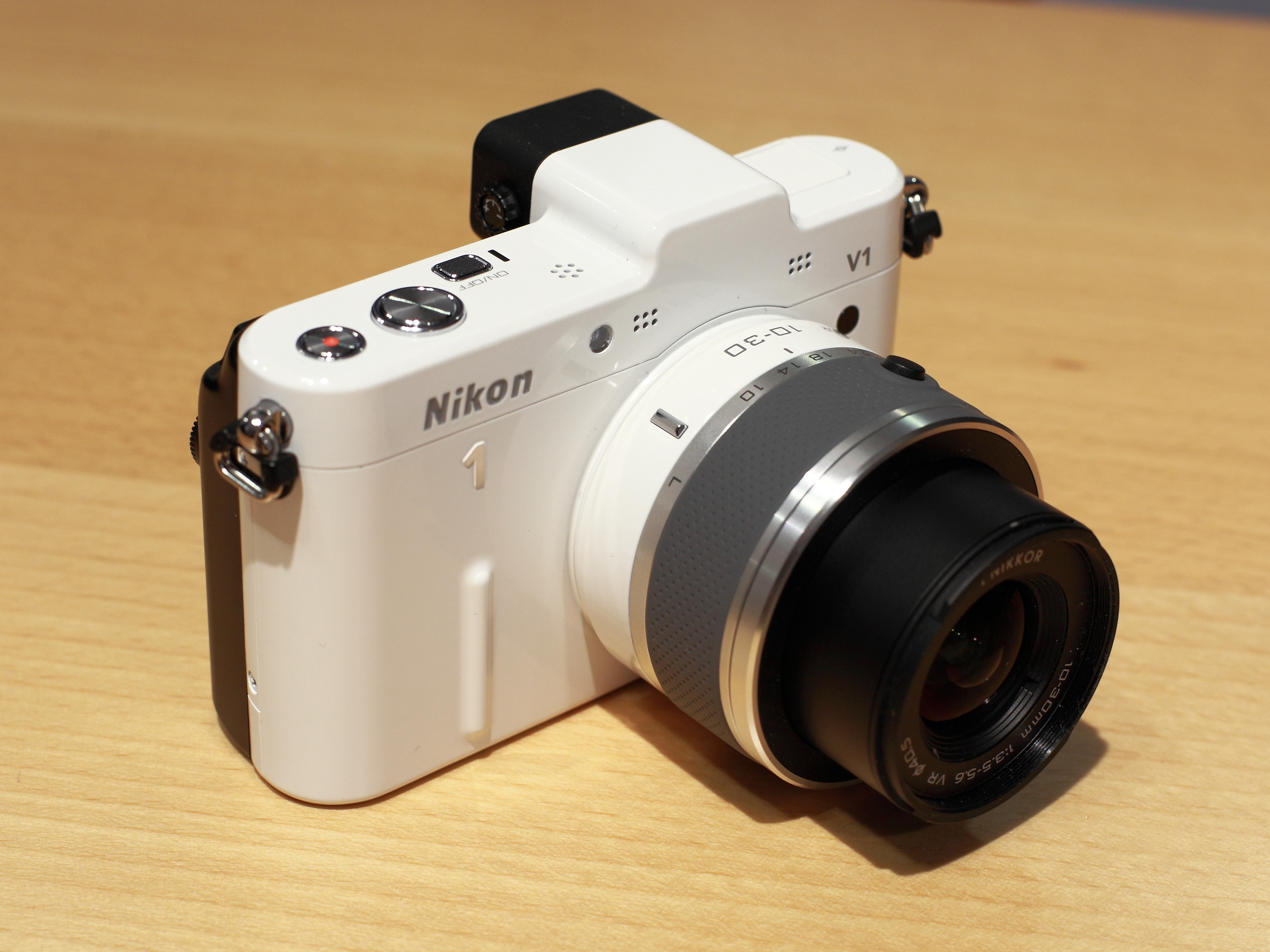
- A Nikon 1 V1 with a Nikkor 10-30mm lens

Overview
- Maker: Nikon
- Type: Mirrorless interchangeable lens camera

Lens
- Lens mount: Nikon 1 mount

Sensor/medium
- Sensor type: CMOS
- Sensor size: 13.2 mm × 8.8 mm
- Maximum resolution: 3,906 x 2,606; 10.1 (effective megapixels)
- Recording medium: SD, SDHC, SDXC. Also UHS-I and Eye-Fi (WLAN)

Focusing
- Focus: hybrid phase detection and contrast detection autofocus
- Focus modes: Single AF (AF-S); continuous AF (AF-C); auto AF-S/AF-C selection (AF-A); fulltime AF (AF-F); manual (M)
- Focus areas: 135 focus areas (Single-point AF); 41 focus areas (Auto-area AF)

Exposure/metering
- Exposure metering: TTL metering using image sensor
- Metering modes: Matrix metering, center-weighted metering, spot metering

Shutter
- Frame rate: 5/10/30/60 fps
- Shutter speed range: 1/4000 to 30 s (mechanical); 1/16000 to 30 s (electronic); X-sync at 1/250

Image processing
- Image processor: EXPEED 3

General
- Battery: Nikon EN-EL15 Lithium-Ion battery
- Dimensions: 113×76×43.5 mm (4.45×2.99×1.71 in)
- Weight: 294 g (10 oz) (0.648 lb)
- Made in: China

The Nikon 1 V1 is a Nikon 1 series high-speed mirrorless interchangeable-lens camera launched by Nikon on 21 September 2011, alongside the Nikon J1.

The successor is the Nikon 1 V2 announced on October 24, 2012.

The CMOS sensor from Aptina is used, it has 10.1 MP, CX format, die size 16.9 mm × 17.9 mm which it is relatively similar with 1" sensor size.

== See also ==
- Nikon 1 series
- Nikon 1-mount

Class	2011		2012	2013	2014	2015	2016	2017	2018
High-end		1 V1		1 V2	1 V3 ^{AT}				Nikon Z
Mid-range		1 J1	1 J2	1 J3		1 J4 ^{T}	1 J5 ^{AT}		Nikon Z
Entry-level				1 S1		1 S2			Nikon Z
Rugged					1 AW1 ^{S}				Nikon Z
Class									
Class	2011		2012	2013	2014	2015	2016	2017	2018
