= Nikon 1 S2 =

2014 mirrorless interchangeable-lens camera

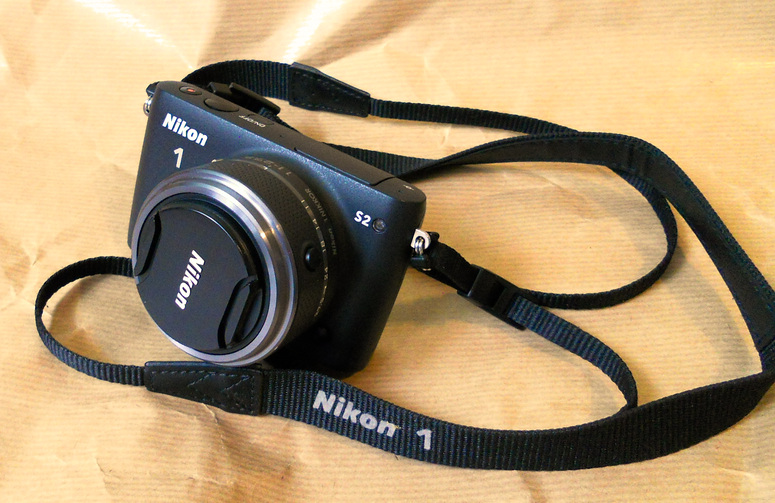

Overview
- Maker: Nikon
- Type: Mirrorless interchangeable lens camera
- Production: 2014-05-14 through 2018-07 (4 years 1 month)

Lens
- Lens mount: Nikon 1 mount

Sensor/medium
- Sensor type: CMOS
- Sensor size: 13.1 x 8.8mm (1 inch type)
- Maximum resolution: 14.2 megapixels
- Recording medium: microSD, microSDHC or microSDXC memory card

Focusing
- Focus areas: 171 focus points

Shutter
- Shutter speeds: 1/16000s to 30s
- Continuous shooting: 60 frames per second

Image processing
- Image processor: Expeed 4A
- White balance: Yes

General
- Video recording: 1080p @ 30/60 fps, 720p @ 30/60 fps, 768 x 288 @ 400 fps, 416 x 144 @ 1200 fps
- LCD screen: 3 inches with 460,000 dots
- Battery: EN-EL22
- Dimensions: 101 x 61 x 29mm (3.98 x 2.4 x 1.14 inches)
- Weight: including battery

Chronology
- Predecessor: Nikon 1 S1

The Nikon 1 S2 is a digital mirrorless interchangeable lens camera announced by Nikon on May 14, 2014.

== Features ==
Improvements and changes over the previous S1 model include:

- Higher resolution, with the S2 having a 14.2 MP sensor (S1 had a 10.1 MP sensor)
- Continuous shooting rate increased to 20 fps (60 fps with fixed focus)
- Autofocus points increased to 171 focus points
- ISO range up to 12,800
- Video had a better high-framerate option of 1080/60p
- Battery life increased to 270 shots per charge, compared to about 220 shots on the S1
- S2 uses the smaller microSD storage cards.

== See also ==
- Nikon 1 series
- Nikon 1-mount
- List of smallest mirrorless cameras

Class	2011		2012	2013	2014	2015	2016	2017	2018
High-end		1 V1		1 V2	1 V3 ^{AT}				Nikon Z
Mid-range		1 J1	1 J2	1 J3		1 J4 ^{T}	1 J5 ^{AT}		Nikon Z
Entry-level				1 S1		1 S2			Nikon Z
Rugged						1 AW1 ^{S}			Nikon Z
Class									
Class	2011		2012	2013	2014	2015	2016	2017	2018
