= Nikon 1 J2 =

2012 mirrorless interchangeable-lens camera

Overview
- Maker: Nikon
- Type: Mirrorless interchangeable lens camera

Lens
- Lens mount: Nikon 1 mount

Sensor/medium
- Sensor type: CMOS
- Sensor size: 13.2 mm × 8.8 mm
- Maximum resolution: 3893 x 2595 (10.1 effective megapixels)
- Recording medium: SD, SDHC, SDXC. Also UHS-I and Eye-Fi (WLAN)

Image processing
- Image processor: EXPEED 3

General
- Weight: 237 g (8 oz) (0.522 lb)

Chronology
- Predecessor: Nikon 1 J1
- Successor: Nikon 1 J3

The Nikon 1 J2 is a Nikon 1 series high-speed mirrorless interchangeable-lens camera launched by Nikon. Nikon lists the estimated selling price of the Nikon 1 J2 One-Lens Kit in the United States at $549.95. This kit comes with the 1 NIKKOR VR 10-30mm f/3.5-5.6 lens.

It is the successor of the Nikon 1 J1 and predecessor of Nikon 1 J3.

== Features list ==
- Effective Pixels: 10.1 million
- Sensor Size: 13.2mmx 8.8mm
- Image Sensor Format: CX
- Image processor: Expeed 3
- Storage Media: SD, SDHC, SDXC
- 5 frames per second
- 10, 30 or 60 fps using Electronic (Hi) shutter
- ISO Sensitivity: 100–3200, max expandable: 6400
- Audio file format: ACC
- Movie file format: MOV
- Monitor Size: 3.0 in. diagonal
- Monitor Type: TFT-LCD with brightness adjustment
- Battery: EN-EL20 Lithium-ion Battery
- Approx. Dimensions: 4.2 by 2.4 by 1.2 inches (107 mm × 61 mm × 30 mm)
- Approx. Weight: 8.4 oz (240 g)

== See also ==
- Nikon 1 series
- Nikon 1-mount
- List of smallest mirrorless cameras

Class	2011		2012	2013	2014	2015	2016	2017	2018
High-end		1 V1		1 V2	1 V3 ^{AT}				Nikon Z
Mid-range		1 J1	1 J2	1 J3		1 J4 ^{T}	1 J5 ^{AT}		Nikon Z
Entry-level				1 S1		1 S2			Nikon Z
Rugged					1 AW1 ^{S}				Nikon Z
Class									
Class	2011		2012	2013	2014	2015	2016	2017	2018
