= Nikon 1 J3 =

2013 mirrorless interchangeable-lens camera

Overview
- Maker: Nikon
- Type: Mirrorless interchangeable lens camera

Lens
- Lens mount: Nikon 1 mount

Sensor/medium
- Sensor type: CMOS
- Sensor size: 13.2 mm × 8.8 mm
- Maximum resolution: 4616 x 3077 (14.2 effective megapixels)
- Recording medium: SD, SDHC, SDXC. Also UHS-I and Eye-Fi (WLAN)

Image processing
- Image processor: EXPEED 3A

General
- Weight: 201 g (7 oz) (0.443 lb)

Chronology
- Predecessor: Nikon 1 J2
- Successor: Nikon 1 J4

The Nikon 1 J3 is a Nikon 1 series high-speed mirrorless interchangeable-lens camera by Nikon. It is the successor of the Nikon 1 J2 and predecessor of Nikon 1 J4.

== Features ==
Featuring a 14 megapixel image sensor and further increased autofocus (hybrid autofocus with phase detection/contrast-detect AF and AF-assist illuminator) speed to 15 frames per second (fps), the maximum continuous shooting speed stays at 60 fps for up to 40 frames.

The image processor Expeed 3A, a successor to the Expeed 3 used in the earlier Nikon 1 series cameras, features a new (according to Nikon) image-processing engine with increased speed of up to 850 megapixels per second. It was developed exclusively for Nikon 1 cameras.

=== Features list ===
- Effective Pixels: 14.2 million
- Sensor Size: 13.2mm x 8.8mm
- Image sensor format: Nikon CX format (a very slight smaller than 1" sensor format)
- Storage Media: SD, SDHC, SDXC
- 15 frames per secondwith AF
- 30/60 fps with focus locked on first frame
- ISO Sensitivity: 160-6400
- Audio file format: ACC
- Movie file format: MOV
- Monitor Size: 3.0 in. diagonal
- Monitor Type: TFT-LCD with brightness adjustment
- Battery: EN-EL20 Lithium-ion Battery

== See also ==
- Nikon 1 series
- Nikon 1-mount
- List of smallest mirrorless cameras

Class	2011		2012	2013	2014	2015	2016	2017	2018
High-end		1 V1		1 V2	1 V3 ^{AT}				Nikon Z
Mid-range		1 J1	1 J2	1 J3		1 J4 ^{T}	1 J5 ^{AT}		Nikon Z
Entry-level				1 S1		1 S2			Nikon Z
Rugged						1 AW1 ^{S}			Nikon Z
Class									
Class	2011		2012	2013	2014	2015	2016	2017	2018
