= Nikon 1 J4 =

2014 mirrorless interchangeable-lens camera

Overview
- Maker: Nikon
- Type: Mirrorless interchangeable lens camera

Lens
- Lens mount: Nikon 1 mount

Sensor/medium
- Sensor type: CMOS
- Sensor size: 13.2 x 8.8mm (1 inch type)
- Maximum resolution: 5232 x 3488 (18 effective megapixels)
- Film speed: 160-12800
- Recording medium: microSD, SDHC or SDXC memory card

Focusing
- Focus areas: 171 focus points

Shutter
- Shutter speeds: 1/16000s to 30s
- Continuous shooting: 60 frames per second

Image processing
- Image processor: Expeed 4A
- White balance: Yes

General
- LCD screen: 3 inches with 1,037,000 dots
- Dimensions: 100 x 60 x 29mm (3.92 x 2.36 x 1.12 inches)
- Weight: 232 g (8 oz) including battery

Chronology
- Predecessor: Nikon 1 J3
- Successor: Nikon 1 J5

The Nikon 1 J4 is an entry-level digital mirrorless exchangeable lens camera announced by Nikon on April 10, 2014.

== See also ==
- Nikon 1 series
- Nikon 1-mount
- List of smallest mirrorless cameras

Class	2011		2012	2013	2014	2015	2016	2017	2018
High-end		1 V1		1 V2	1 V3 ^{AT}				Nikon Z
Mid-range		1 J1	1 J2	1 J3		1 J4 ^{T}	1 J5 ^{AT}		Nikon Z
Entry-level				1 S1		1 S2			Nikon Z
Rugged						1 AW1 ^{S}			Nikon Z
Class									
Class	2011		2012	2013	2014	2015	2016	2017	2018
