= Intervalometer =

Device that measures short intervals of time

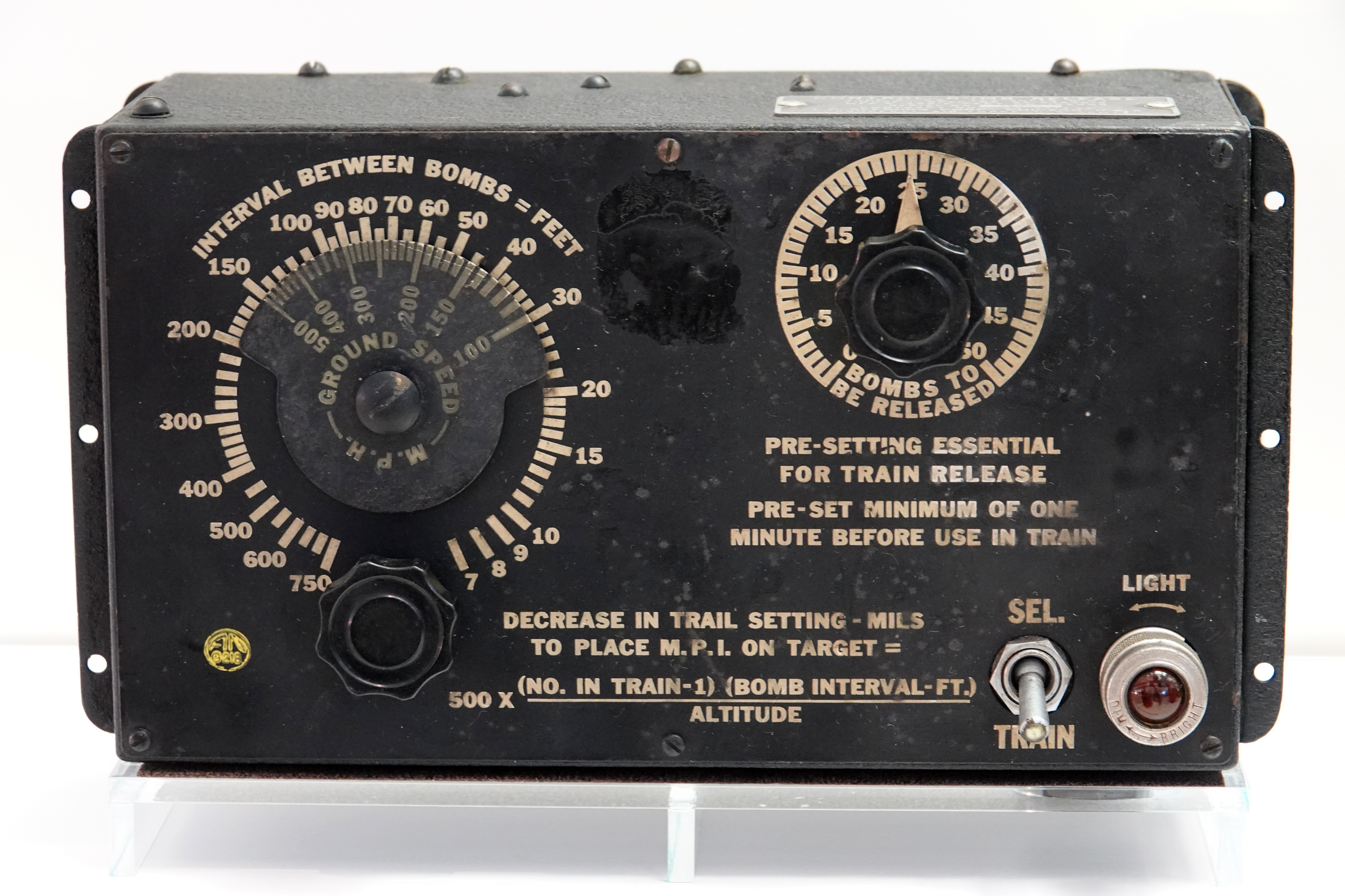
J.P. Seeburg B-2 Intervalometer

An intervalometer, also called an interval meter or interval timer, is a device that measures short intervals of time. People commonly use such devices to signal, in accurate time intervals, the operation of some other device. The intervalometer measures the intermittent pulses between a starting pulse signal and an ending pulse signal, before a pulse counter measures the number of pulses released into the appropriate time interval. For instance, an intervalometer might activate something every 30 seconds.

== Photography ==
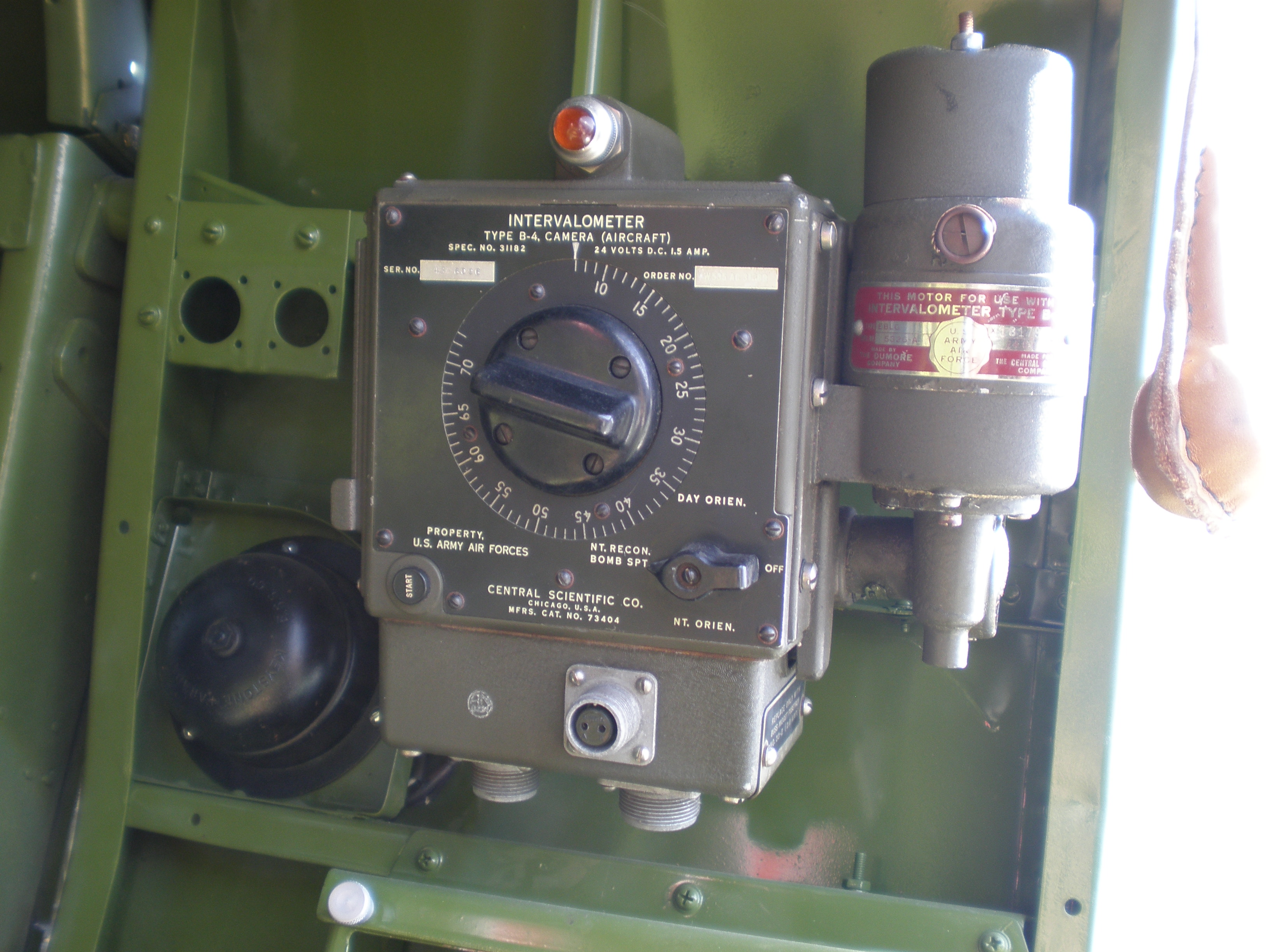
An intervalometer for a reconnaissance camera on a Douglas A-26 Invader aircraft

Photographers use intervalometers to trigger exposures. Photographers often do this for a time-lapse series, or to take or begin taking picture after a set delay.

Examples of intervalometer use in aerial photography include delaying the start of picture taking by an unattended camera until some time after takeoff and separating multiple exposures in time, and thus distance as the vehicle containing the camera travels, to obtain the 3D effect (stereoscopy). To obtain the 3D effect each image should have about 60% of the surface in common with either the preceding or following image. The interval is calculated as a function of the altitude and speed of the vehicle; shorter intervals for low altitude and high speed.

Often the purpose of a photographic intervalometer is to reduce the resources required either to take the pictures or post-process them as similar images could be obtained by having the camera continuously take pictures as rapidly as possible. Using an intervalometer permits restricting the pictures taken to only those with the desired content. This reduces the requirements for resources such as power and storage media (e.g. film or memory card space).

Most digital single-lens reflex (DSLR) cameras are limited to 30 second or shorter exposures. An intervalometer can control long (>30 seconds) or very long exposures (minutes or hours) using the "Bulb" setting. Long and very long exposures taken at night can be combined to create time-lapse animations, including star trails. Astrophotographers can use processing techniques with such exposures to create images of deep-sky objects in the night sky, like nebulae and galaxies.

Most modern cameras include the most basic intervalometer functionality, the "self-timer". This delays the shutter release for a short time, allowing the photographer to get into the picture, for example.

In the past, intervalometers were external devices that interfaced to a camera shutter to take a picture, or series of pictures, at a set time. These sometimes used existing remote shutter features on cameras. Later, standalone products commonly referred to as intervalometers added capabilities beyond the basics of just measuring, and signaling, a time interval. One of the first added features was the ability to use an external event to signal the start of the time intervals. The ability to sense an external event is such a common feature of intervalometer products that many people do not distinguish between the sensing of the event and the measuring of time intervals.

What is meant when someone refers to an "intervalometer" must be determined from context. Some possibilities are: time-lapse capability (strictly an intervalometer function), sensing of a remote event, a time delay longer than what most consider the "self-timer" range, etc. Strictly speaking, an intervalometer only measures, and/or signals, time intervals.

Almost all digital cameras have basic intervalometer functions—current and elapsed times. More advanced functions are a matter of what the manufacturer chooses to implement in the camera's firmware. Functions beyond the self-timer are beginning appear in some digital cameras, and often distinguish between similar models in a camera line.

== Military application ==
The ALE-39 countermeasures system uses intervalometers manufactured by Ledex Inc. (now part of Johnson Electric) of Dayton, Ohio. The ALE-39 fires flares in a synchronized pattern, rapidly and with great reliability. The intervalometer in the ALE-39 is essentially a solenoid-actuated rotary switch driven by a separate programmer, which gives timing intervals and channel enabling to either of one or two channels. Intervalometers that contain internal interval clocks include the Lau-68, Suu-13 and similar electromechanically sequenced switches. Safety is provided to unfired outputs by maintaining a ground connection to all except the output being selected for firing; i.e., providing an electrical pulse to the firing squib.

Bomber aircraft can release all bombs at once ("salvo") or drop individual bombs at intervals. A bombardier who selects the latter can program an intervalometer to control the rate of bomb release, which determines how far apart they land in the target area.

== Home ==
Common intervalometers in homes include timers that turn lights on and off at set times, or controllers for automatic sprinkler system. People use these devices when they leave home for an extended period, to make it appear the home is occupied. There are also a large number of commercial and industrial applications for even such basic intervalometers.
