= Nikon 1 V2 =

2012 mirrorless interchangeable-lens camera

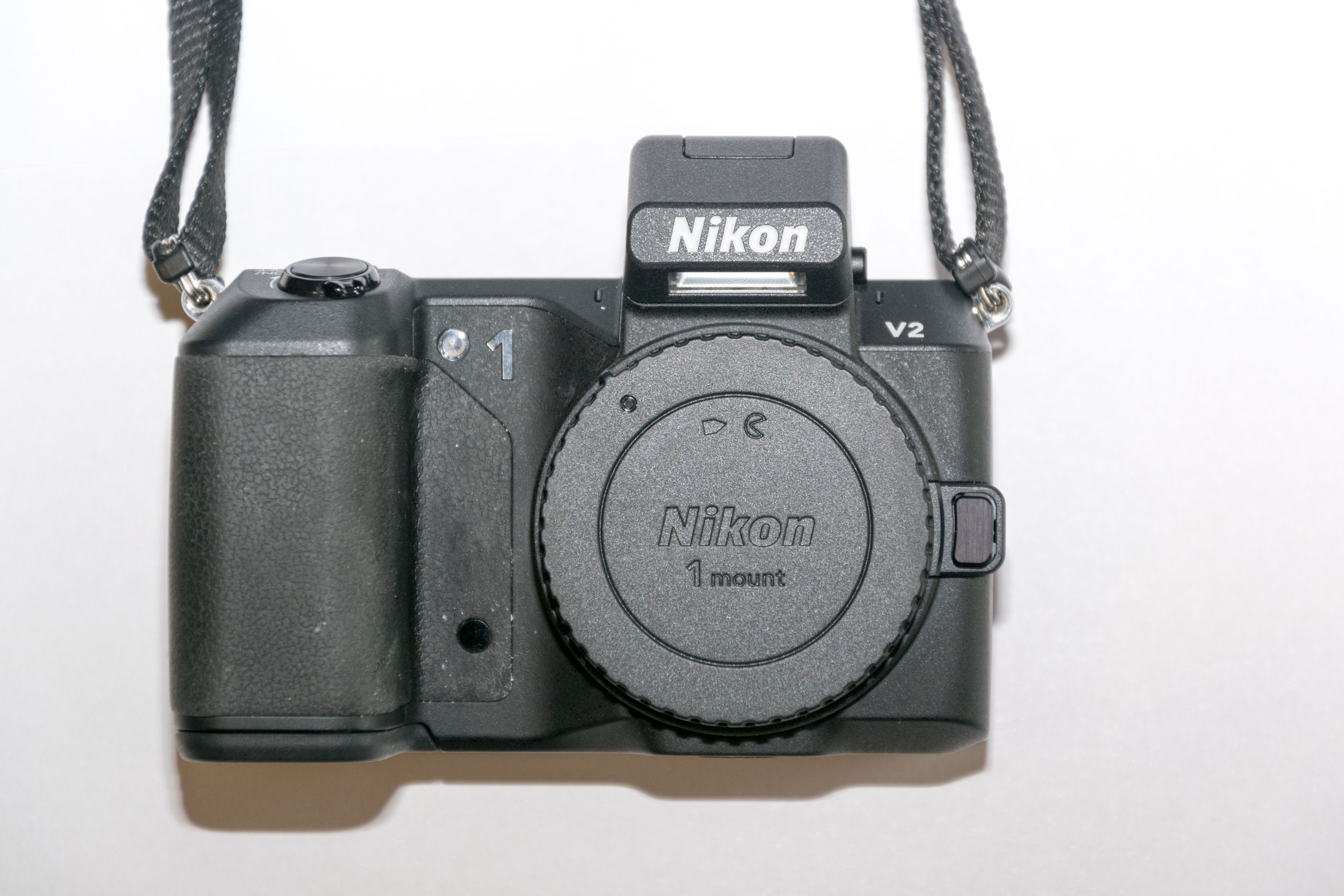

Overview
- Maker: Nikon
- Type: Mirrorless interchangeable lens camera

Lens
- Lens mount: Nikon 1 mount

Sensor/medium
- Sensor type: CMOS
- Sensor size: 13.2 mm × 8.8 mm
- Maximum resolution: 4,608 x 3,072 (14 effective megapixels)
- Recording medium: SD, SDHC, SDXC. Also UHS-I and Eye-Fi (WLAN)

Focusing
- Focus: hybrid phase detection and contrast detection autofocus

Image processing
- Image processor: EXPEED 3A

The Nikon 1 V2 is a Nikon 1 series high-speed mirrorless interchangeable-lens camera launched by Nikon on October 24, 2012.

Featuring a new 14 megapixel image sensor and further increased autofocus (hybrid autofocus with phase detection/contrast-detect AF and AF-assist illuminator) speed to 15 frames per second (fps), the maximum continuous shooting speed stays at 60 fps for up to 40 frames.

The image processor Expeed 3A, a successor to the Expeed 3 used in the former Nikon 1 series cameras, features a new (according to Nikon) image-processing engine with increased speed of up to 850 megapixels per second. It was developed exclusively for Nikon 1 cameras.

The Nikon 1 V2 succeeds the Nikon 1 V1 and is succeeded by the Nikon 1 V3. The Nikon 1 V3 improves on the previous model with an 18.4MP sensor, built-in Wifi, FullHD video at 60 frames per second (non-interpolated), up to 120 frames per second video at 720p resolution, 20fps continuous AF, and 171 focus points, which Nikon claims gives better tracking autofocus than even DSLR cameras.

== Features ==
With the launch of the new camera, comes a number of improvements in features from the Nikon 1 V1. The improved sensor and processor have taken the pixels up to 14 megapixels, compared to the previous 10.1 megapixels with V1. Other improvements include a low light boost, faster action capture and improved lens selection.

== See also ==
- Nikon 1 series
- Nikon 1-mount

Class	2011		2012	2013	2014	2015	2016	2017	2018
High-end		1 V1		1 V2	1 V3 ^{AT}				Nikon Z
Mid-range		1 J1	1 J2	1 J3		1 J4 ^{T}	1 J5 ^{AT}		Nikon Z
Entry-level				1 S1		1 S2			Nikon Z
Rugged						1 AW1 ^{S}			Nikon Z
Class									
Class	2011		2012	2013	2014	2015	2016	2017	2018
