= Photoplus =

Defunct American photographers conference based in New York

- Nickname: PDN PhotoPlus International Conference + Expo
- Status: Defunct
- Genre: Conference and expo
- Frequency: Annually
- Venue: Jacob K. Javits Convention Center then The Duggal Greenhouse in Brooklyn
- Location: New York City
- Country: United States
- Inaugurated: 1983
- Most recent: 2023
- Participants: Wedding and portrait photographers
- Patron: Photo District News (until 2020) then Emerald X
- Organiser: Emerald X
- Website: photoplusexpo.com

The PhotoPlus, formerly known as the PDN PhotoPlus International Conference + Expo, was an annual event held since 1983 at the Jacob K. Javits Convention Center in New York. Designed for professional and advanced amateur photographers, Photoplus displayed recent advances in photography through a variety of exhibitions as well as photography and digital design seminars.

The 2020 and 2021 editions were canceled due to COVID. In 2022, after the 2020 closure of parent magazine Photo District News, the event rebranded as CreateNYC powered by PhotoPlus and moved to the Duggal Greenhouse in Brooklyn. The event was owned by Emerald X which is also the owners of Rangefinder, WPPI, and The Portrait Masters.

== Exhibits ==
The event included exhibits on photography, design, and digital imaging. The subject matter varied considerably, ranging from color management to retouching and storage. The 2007 event included over 300 exhibitors and over 10,000 items on display.

Exhibitors have included Adobe Systems, Apple, Canon, Epson, FujiFilm, Microsoft, Nikon, Olympus Corporation, and Sony.

== Workshops and keynote addresses ==
Over 100 photography seminars were held. These included hands-on workshops and keynotes by reputable photographers, with a focus on innovations in digital imaging techniques.
