= Nikon CX format =

Digital image sensor format

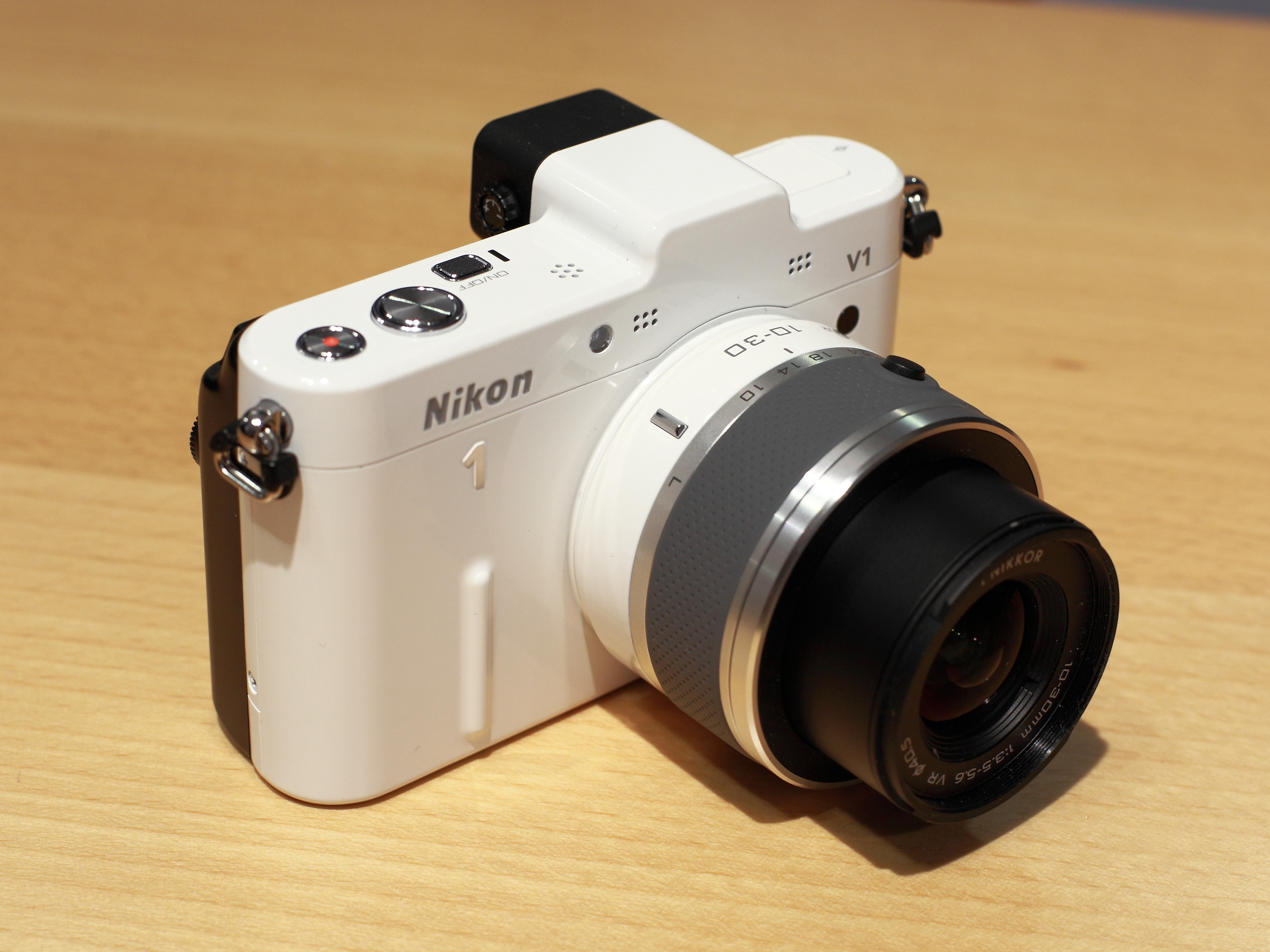
Nikon 1 V1 with 10-30mm.

The Nikon CX format is an image sensor format by Nikon for the Nikon 1 series MILCs featuring the Nikon 1 mount bayonet and lenses. With 2.7 times crop factor being approximately 13.2 x 8.8mm^{2} (also known as 1"-type), it considerably increases the depth of field by 2.90 stops compared to a 35mm FX camera with the same angle of view. The format was announced in September 2011 by Nikon for its mirrorless interchangeable-lens cameras, the Nikon 1 series.

On a digital camera, it is the third format and second mount from Nikon after the two Nikon F-mount formats: the crop-sensor Nikon DX format and the full-frame Nikon FX format.

Nikon discontinued the Nikon 1 series and its CX format in July 2018 when the Nikon Z-mount was introduced.

== See also ==
- Image sensor format

| Class | 2011 | | 2012 | 2013 | 2014 | 2015 | 2016 | 2017 | 2018 |
| High-end | | 1 V1 | | 1 V2 | 1 V3 ^{AT} | | | | Nikon Z |
| Mid-range | | 1 J1 | 1 J2 | 1 J3 | | 1 J4 ^{T} | 1 J5 ^{AT} | | Nikon Z |
| Entry-level | | | | 1 S1 | | 1 S2 | | | Nikon Z |
| Rugged | | | | | | 1 AW1 ^{S} | | | Nikon Z |
| Class | | | | | | | | | |
| Class | 2011 | | 2012 | 2013 | 2014 | 2015 | 2016 | 2017 | 2018 |

| Sensor | Class | '99 | '00 | '01 | '02 | '03 | '04 | '05 | '06 | '07 | '08 | '09 | '10 | '11 | '12 | '13 | '14 | '15 | '16 | '17 | '18 | '19 | '20 | '21 | '22 | '23 | '24 | '25 | '26 |
|---|---|---|---|---|---|---|---|---|---|---|---|---|---|---|---|---|---|---|---|---|---|---|---|---|---|---|---|---|---|
| FX (Full-frame) | Flagship | | | | | | | | | | | D3X ^{−P} | | | | | | | | | | | | | | | | | |
| FX (Full-frame) | Flagship | | | | | | | | | | D3 ^{−P} | | D3S ^{−P} | | D4 | | D4S | | D5^{T} | | | | | D6^{T} | | | | | |
| FX (Full-frame) | Professional | | | | | | | | | | | D700 ^{−P} | | | D800/D800E | | | D810/D810A | | | D850 ^{AT} | | | | | | | | |
| FX (Full-frame) | Enthusiast | | | | | | | | | | | | | | | | Df | | | | | | | | | | | | |
| FX (Full-frame) | Enthusiast | | | | | | | | | | | | | | | | | D750 ^{A} | | | | | D780 ^{AT} | | | | | | |
| FX (Full-frame) | Enthusiast | | | | | | | | | | | | | | | D600 | D610 | | | | | | | | | | | | |
| DX (APS-C) | Flagship | | D1^{−E} | D1X^{−E} | | | | D2X^{−E} | | D2Xs^{−E} | | | | | | | | | | | | | | | | | | | |
| DX (APS-C) | Flagship | | D1^{−E} | D1H ^{−E} | | | D2H^{−E} | D2Hs^{−E} | | | | | | | | | | | | | | | | | | | | | |
| DX (APS-C) | Professional | | | | D100^{−E} | | | | D200^{−E} | | D300^{−P} | | D300S^{−P} | | | | | | D500 ^{AT} | | | | | | | | | | |
| DX (APS-C) | Enthusiast | | | | | | D70^{−E} | | D70s^{−E} | D80^{−E} | | D90^{−E} | | D7000 ^{−P} | | | D7100 | D7200 | | | D7500 ^{AT} | | | | | | | | |
| DX (APS-C) | Upper-entry | | | | | | | | D50^{−E} | D40X^{−E*} | D60^{−E*} | | D5000^{A−P*} | | D5100^{A−P*} | D5200^{A−P*} | D5300^{A*} | D5500^{AT*} | | D5600 ^{AT*} | | | | | | | | | |
| DX (APS-C) | Entry-level | | | | | | | | | D40^{−E*} | | | D3000^{−E*} | D3100^{−P*} | | D3200^{−P*} | D3300^{*} | | | D3400^{*} | | D3500^{*} | | | | | | | |
| Early models | | SVC (prototype; 1986); QV-1000C (1988); NASA F4 (1991); E2/E2S (1995); E2N/E2NS (1996); E3/E3S (1998) | | | | | | | | | | | | | | | | | | | | | | | | | | | |
| Sensor | Class | | | | | | | | | | | | | | | | | | | | | | | | | | | | |
| Sensor | Class | '99 | '00 | '01 | '02 | '03 | '04 | '05 | '06 | '07 | '08 | '09 | '10 | '11 | '12 | '13 | '14 | '15 | '16 | '17 | '18 | '19 | '20 | '21 | '22 | '23 | '24 | '25 | '26 |
