= Fujifilm X-H2S =

2022 APS-C mirrorless camera

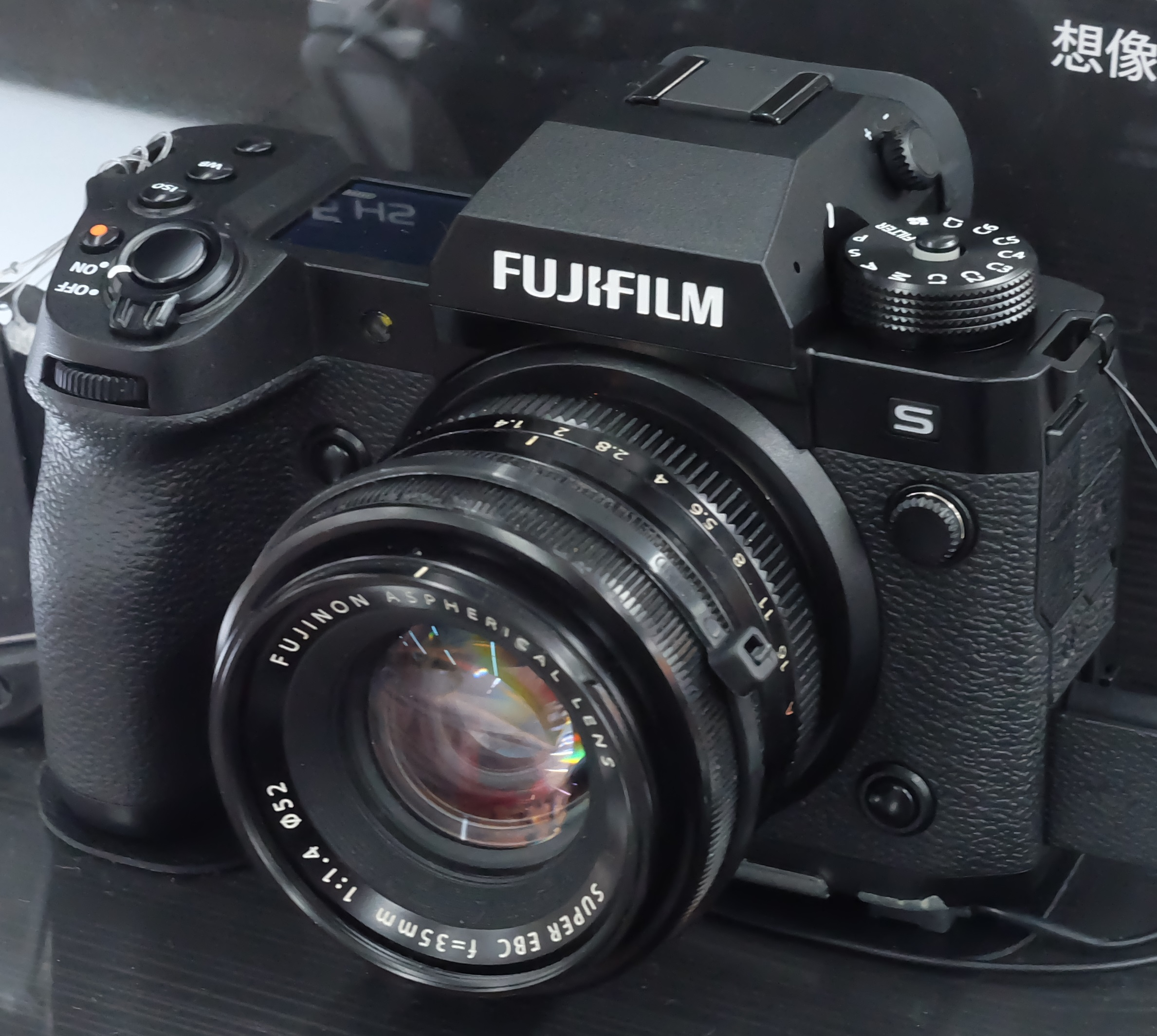
- Fujifilm X-H2S + XF35mm F1.4 R

Overview
- Maker: Fujifilm
- Type: MILC
- Released: 14 July 2022; 4 years ago
- Intro price: JPY 350,000; USD 2,499 (body)

Lens
- Lens mount: Fujifilm X
- Lens: Interchangeable lens
- Compatible lenses: Fujinon

Sensor/medium
- Sensor: APS-C
- Sensor type: X-Trans CMOS 5 HS
- Sensor size: 23.5 mm x 15.6 mm
- Sensor maker: Sony
- Maximum resolution: 26.16 megapixels 6240 x 4160
- Film speed: 160–12800 (standard); 80–51200 (extend)
- Storage media: Dual Slot SD, SDHC, SDXC, UHS-II, CFexpress Type B

Focusing
- Focus: Intelligent Hybrid TTL AF contrast and phase detection
- Focus modes: Single AF, Continuous AF, Manual
- Focus areas: 117 focus point
- Focus bracketing: Auto, Manual

Exposure/metering
- Exposure: TTL 256-zone metering
- Exposure bracketing: 2 frames / 3 frames / 5 frames / 7 frames / 9 frames by 1/3EV step, up to ±3EV steps
- Exposure modes: Program AE, Aperture Priority AE, Shutter Speed Priority AE, Manual Exposure
- Exposure metering: Through-the-lens
- Metering modes: Multi, Spot, Average, Center Weighted

Flash
- Flash: EF-X8 external flash
- Compatible flashes: Shoe Mount Flash, Synchronized terminal

Shutter
- Shutter: Focal Plane Shutter
- Shutter speeds: 4 s to 1/8000 s (mechanical), 4 s to 1/32000 s (electronic)
- Continuous shooting: 40.0 fps

Viewfinder
- Viewfinder: EVF with eye sensor
- Electronic viewfinder: 0.5" 5.76M dots OLED Viewfinder
- Viewfinder magnification: 0.80
- Frame coverage: 100%

Image processing
- Image processor: X-Processor 5
- White balance: Daylight, Shade, Fluorescent, Incandescent Light, Underwater
- WB bracketing: ±1, ±2, ±3
- Dynamic range bracketing: 100%, 200%, 400%

General
- Video recording: MOV; 6.2K up to 30 fps,4K up to 120 fps, 1080p up to 240 fps
- LCD screen: 3.0" 1.62M dots touchscreen vari-angle monitor
- Battery: NP-W235 Li-ion (USB rechargeable)
- AV port(s): HDMI A, ⌀3.5 mm & ⌀2.5 mm audio jack
- Data port: USB-C 3.2, Wi-Fi 5, Bluetooth 4.2
- Body features: 7-stop 5-axis In-Body Image Stabilization
- Dimensions: 136.3 mm × 92.9 mm × 84.6 mm (5.37 in × 3.66 in × 3.33 in)
- Weight: 660 g (23 oz) (1.46 lb) including battery and memory card
- Made in: China

Chronology
- Predecessor: Fujifilm X-H1

Fujifilm X-H2S is a 26-megapixel mirrorless camera produced by Fujifilm. The X-H2S, which is positioned as a professional mirrorless camera rather than then retro-inspired bodies of other X series cameras, is the company's latest high-speed flagship model. It is the successor of the X-H1 from 2018 and it was made available for $2,499 on July 7, 2022.

The X-H2S has ProRes internal, ProRes RAW, and BRAW external recording. It is the first digital camera to incorporate the 26.16-megapixel X-Trans CMOS 5 HS imaging sensor, which is both stacked and backside-illuminated, allowing it to read data four times faster than Fujifilm's previous X-Trans CMOS 4 sensor.

== Features ==
- A modern PSAM dial replacing the traditional shutter speed and ISO dials.
- Improved speed, autofocus tracking capabilities, and hybrid video shooting
- 26-megapixel backside-illuminated APS-C layered construction.
- 3" A fully articulating 1.62 million-dot LCD
- 5.76 million-dot EVF with 0.8x magnification
- New Autofocus system
- Enhanced Prediction Method to improve Zone AF performance created using Deep Learning technology
- 6.2K 30p video recording of 4:2:2, 10-bit Apple ProRes HQ, ProRes 422, ProRes LT, and ProRes 422 Proxy
- 4K 120p video recording of 4:2:2, 10-bit h.265
- Full HD 240p
- 1/180s sensor readout speed reducing visual effects of rolling shutter
- FAN-001 optional external cooling fan available
- F-Log2 providing 14+ stops of dynamic range
- Large grip, top-facing LCD, and a heavy-duty body
- Dual memory card slots: SD and CFexpress Type B
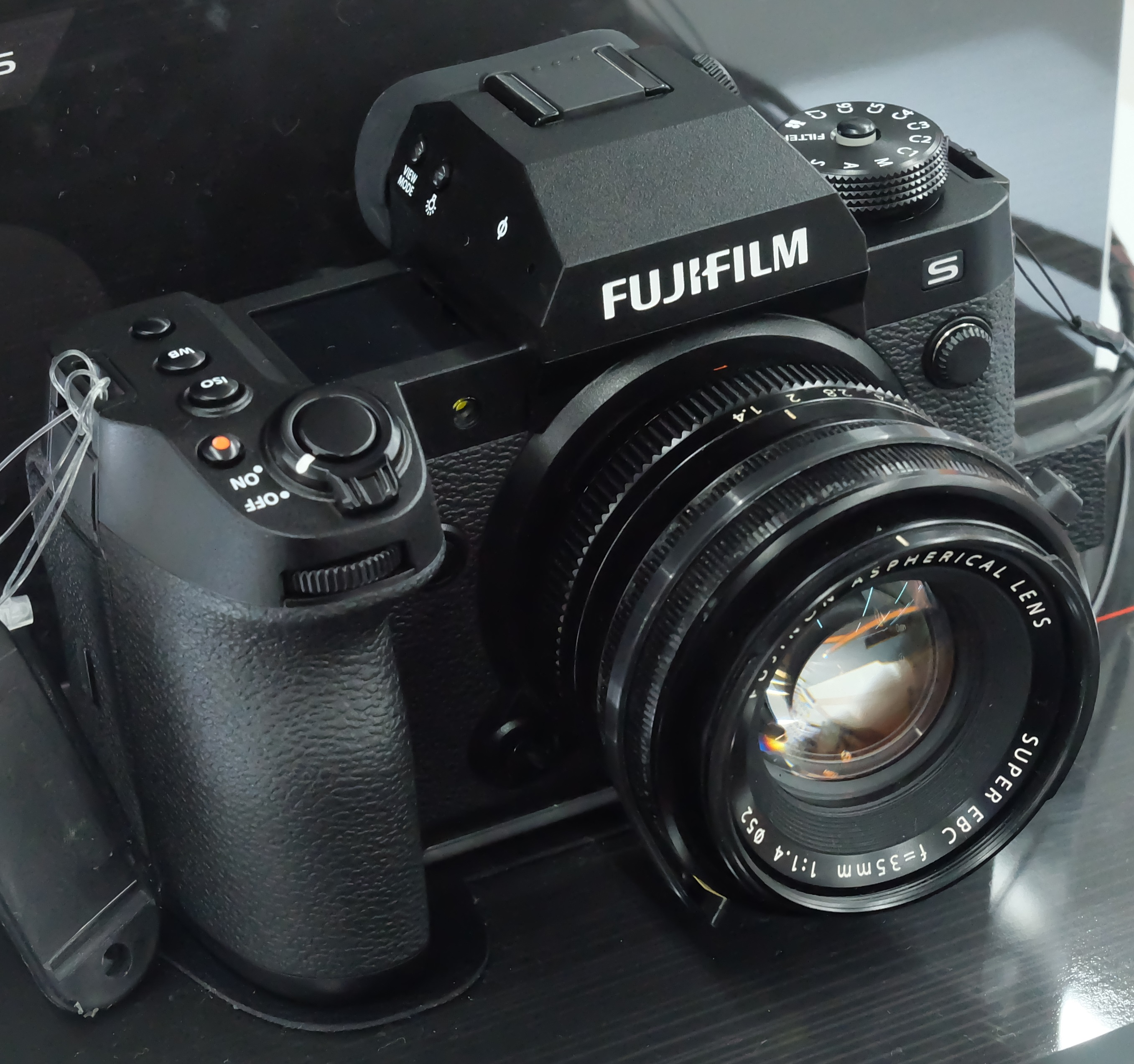

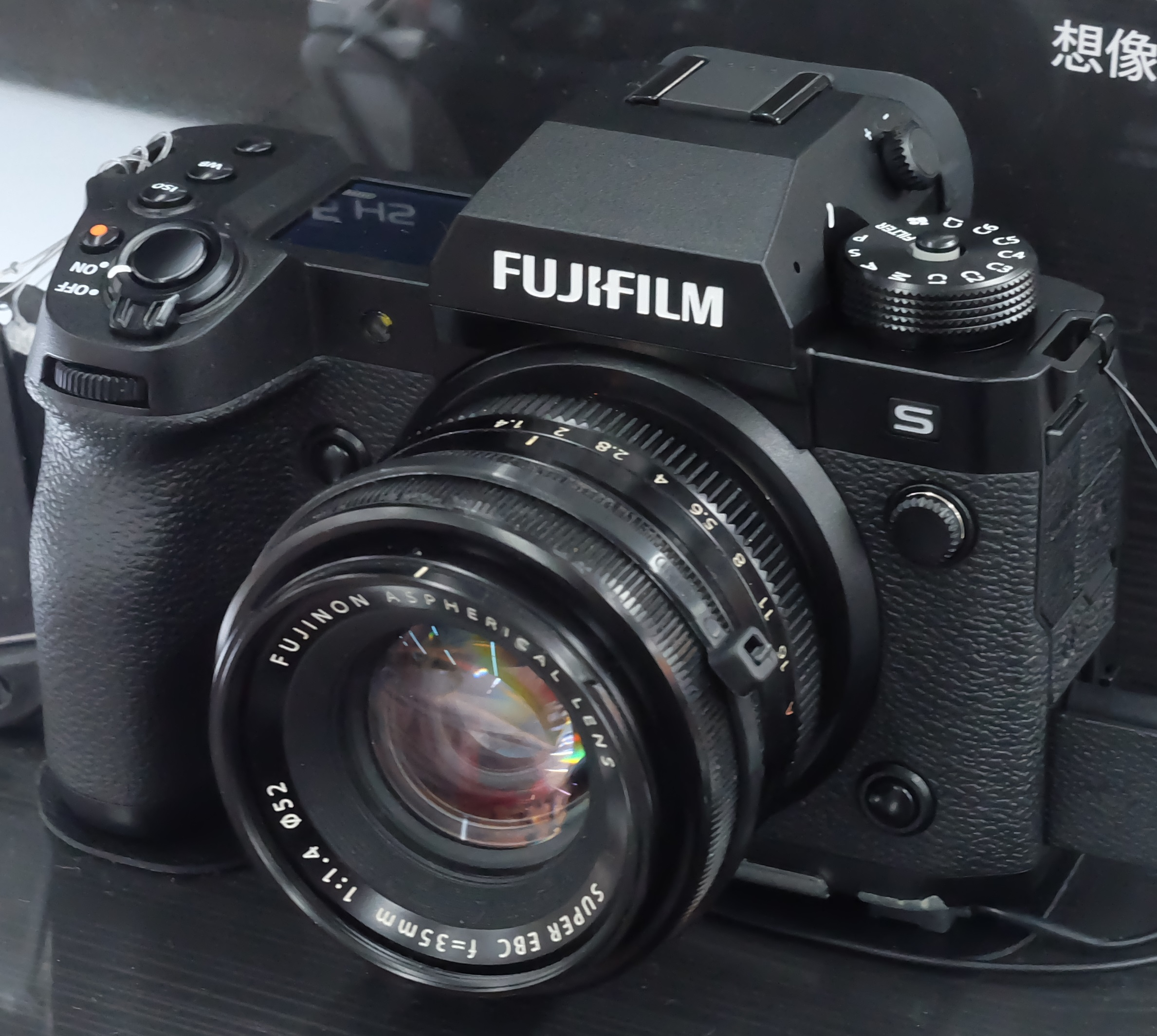

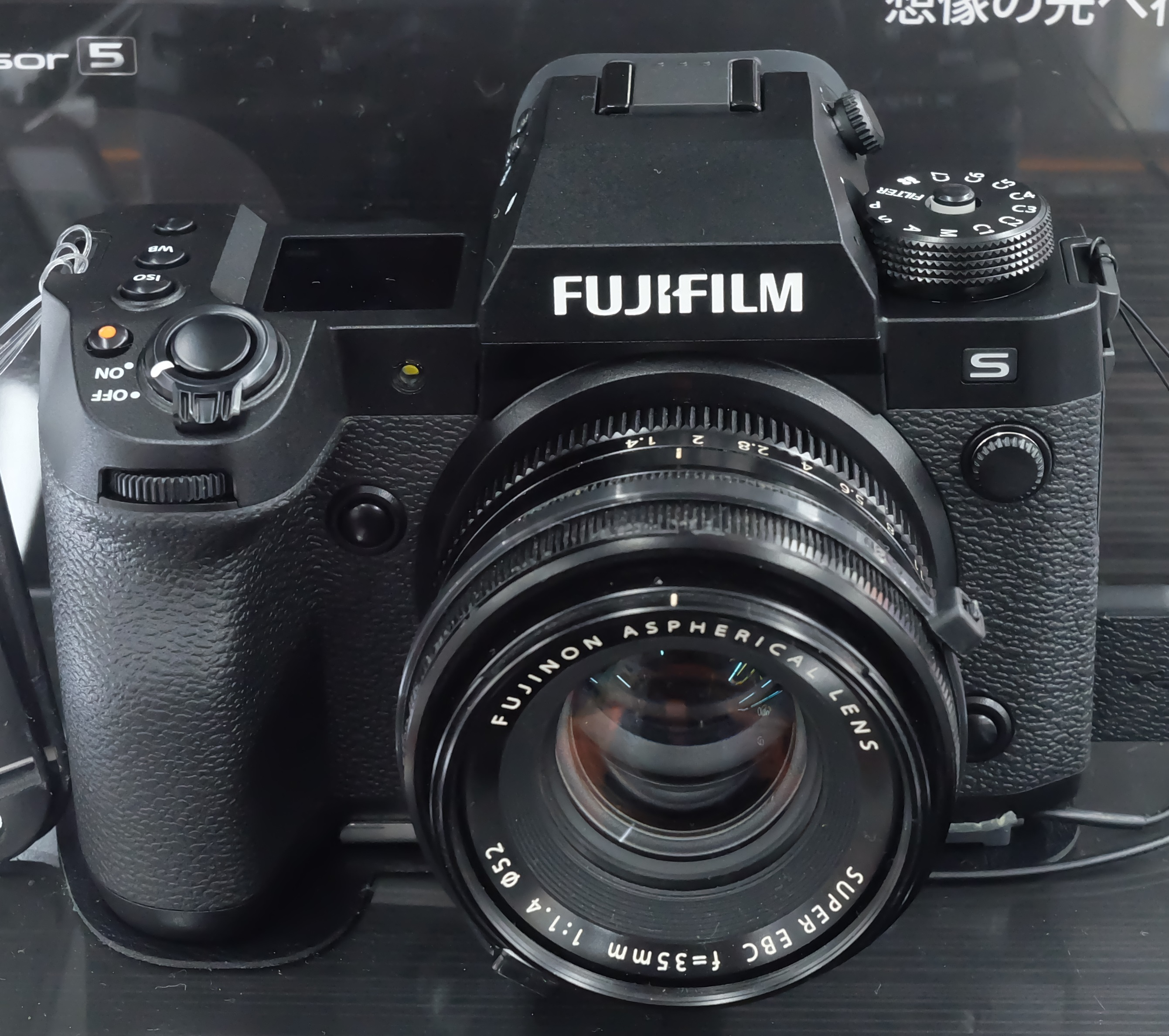

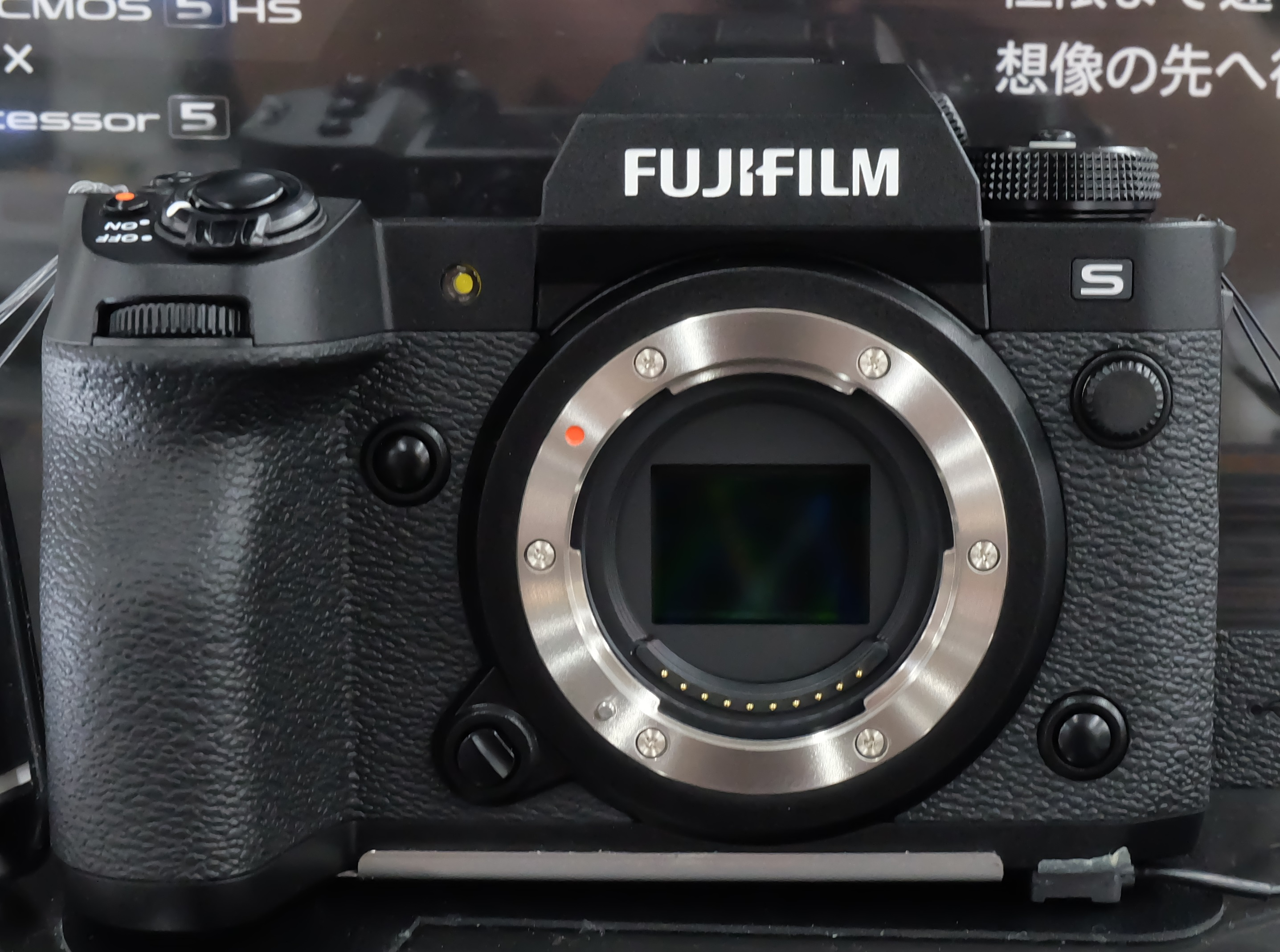

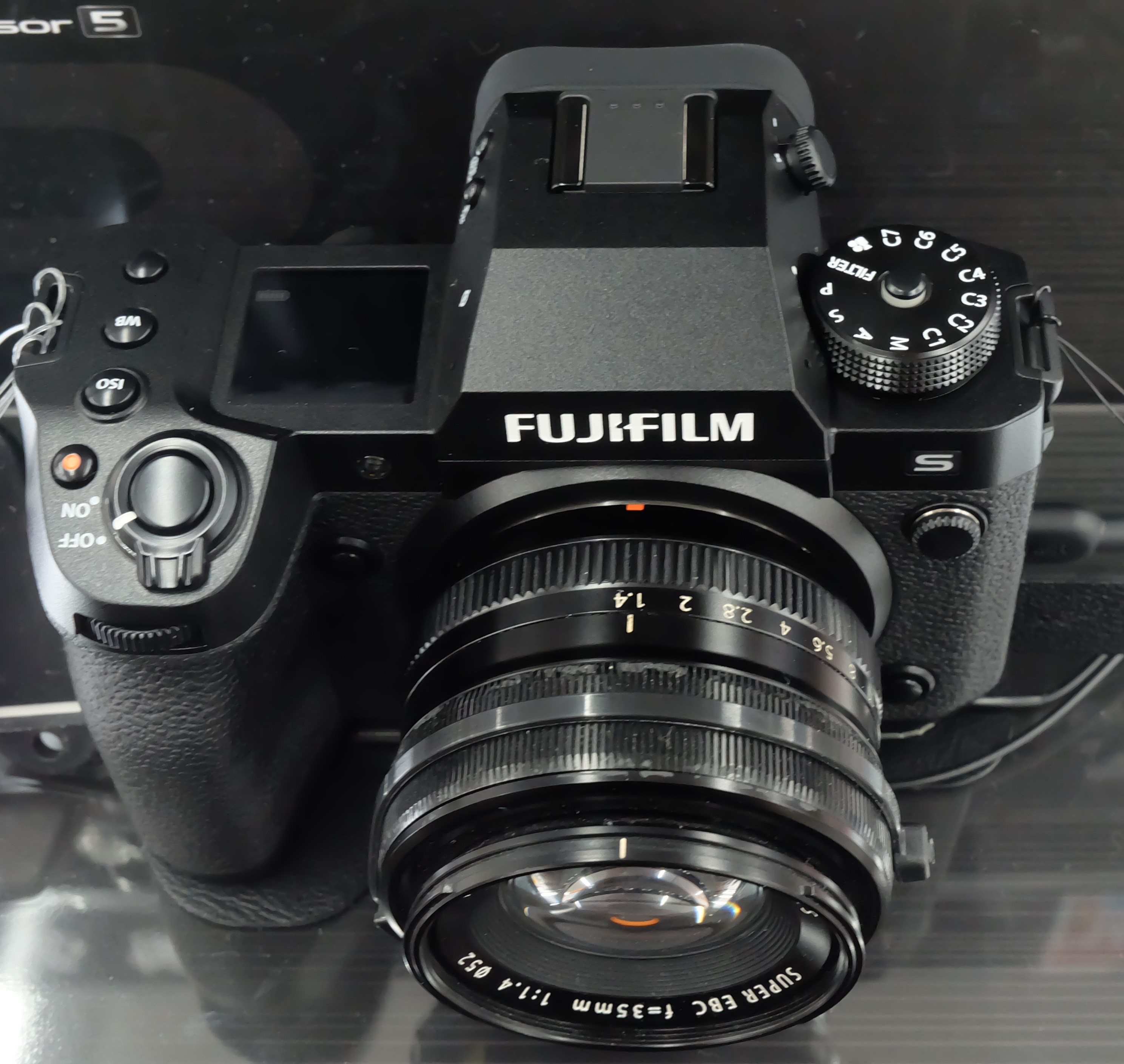

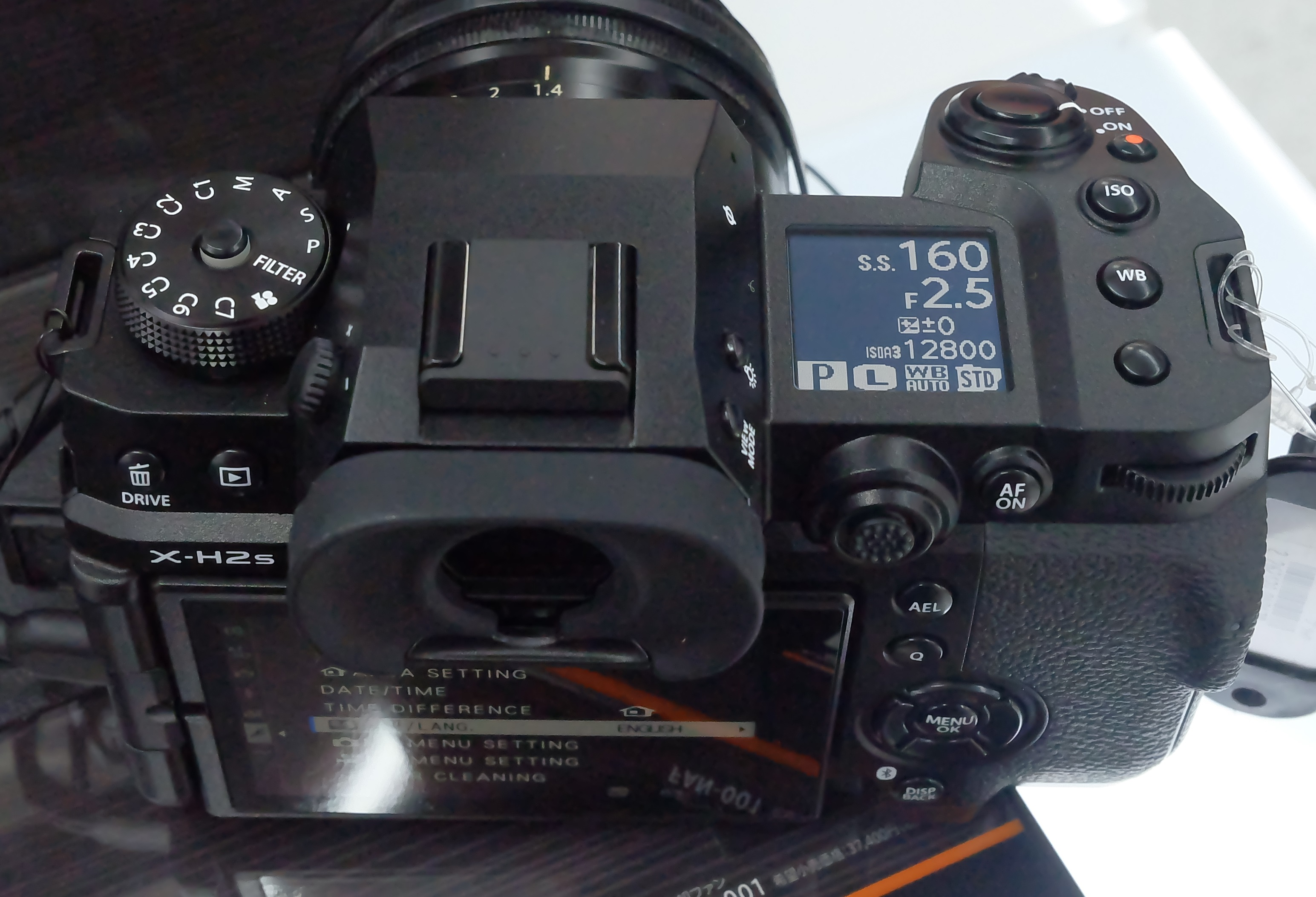

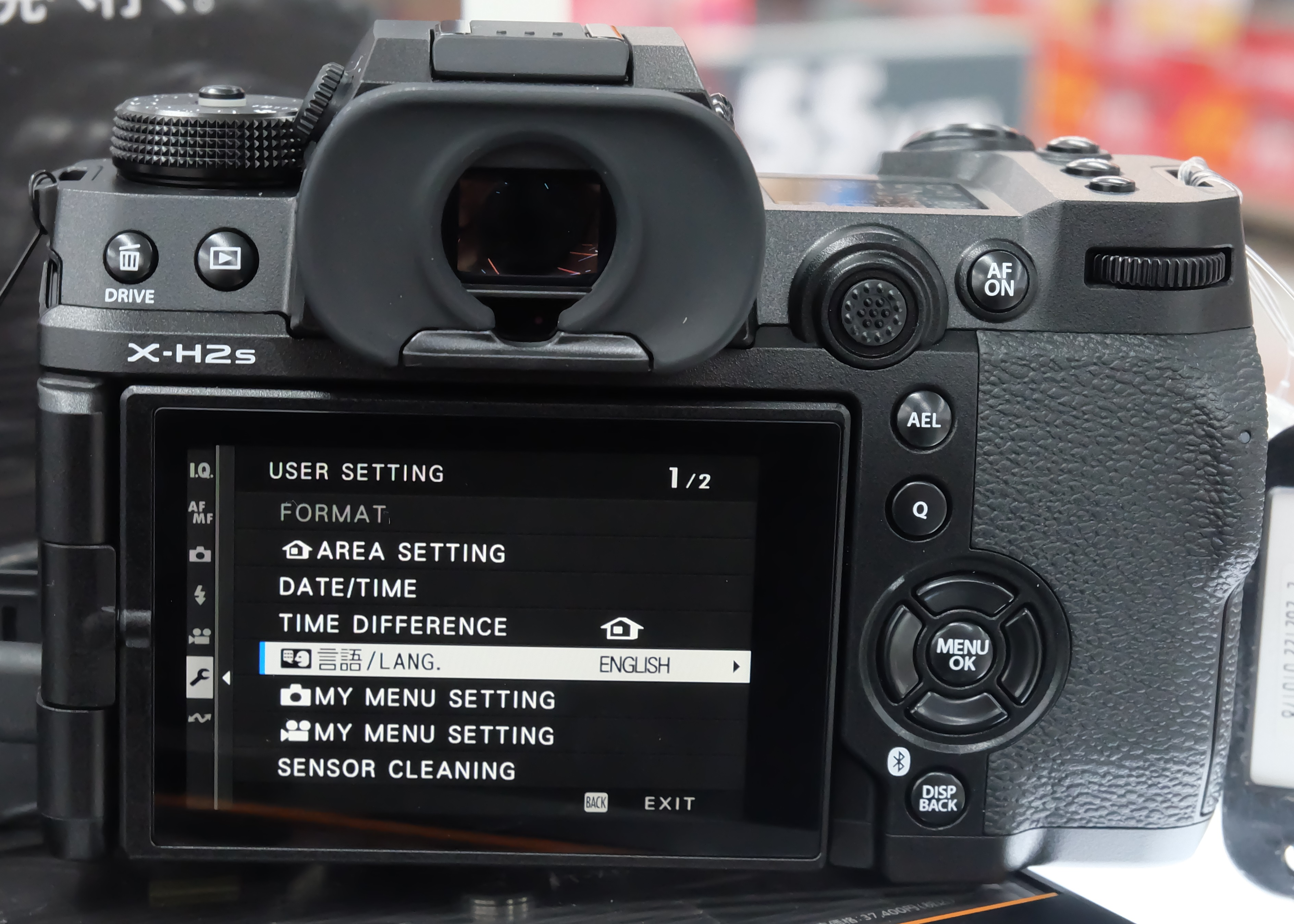

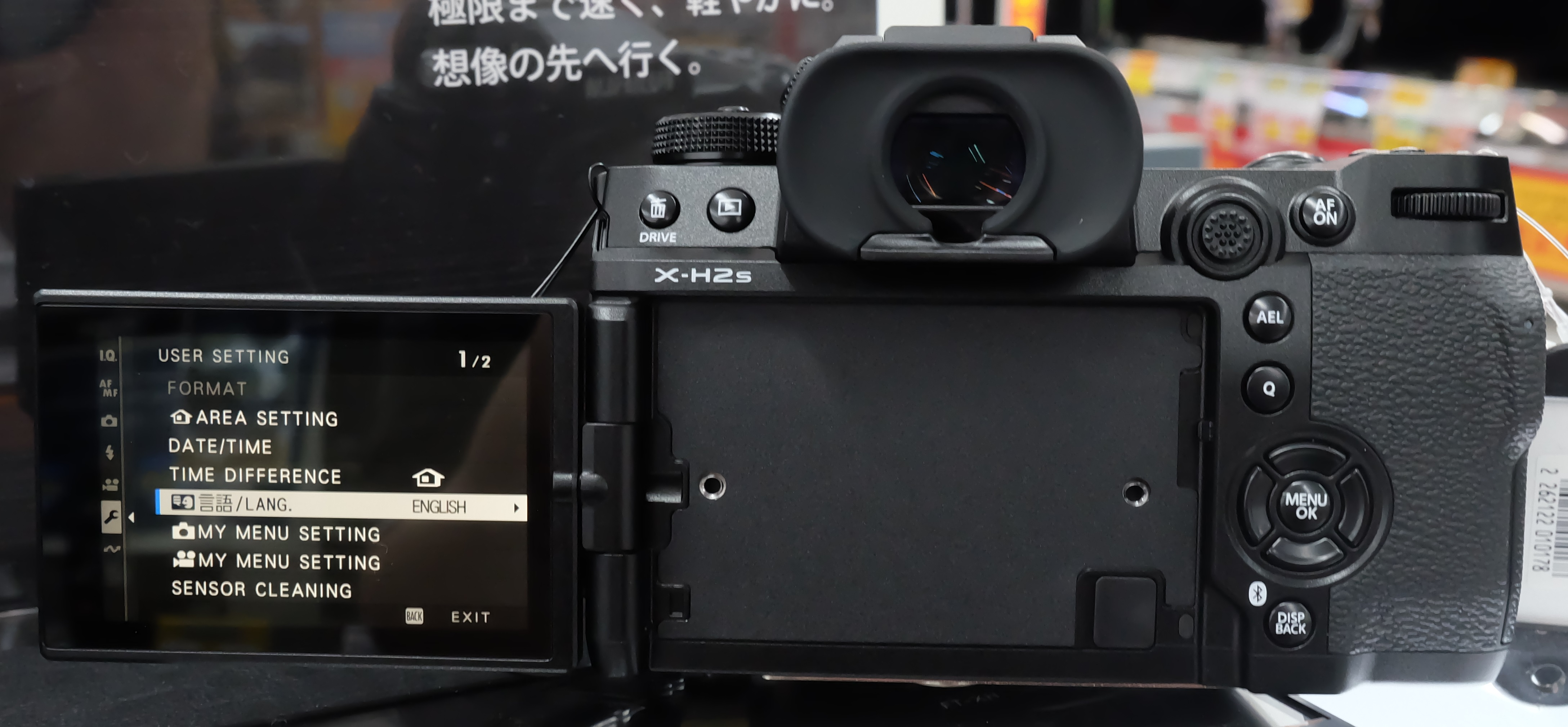

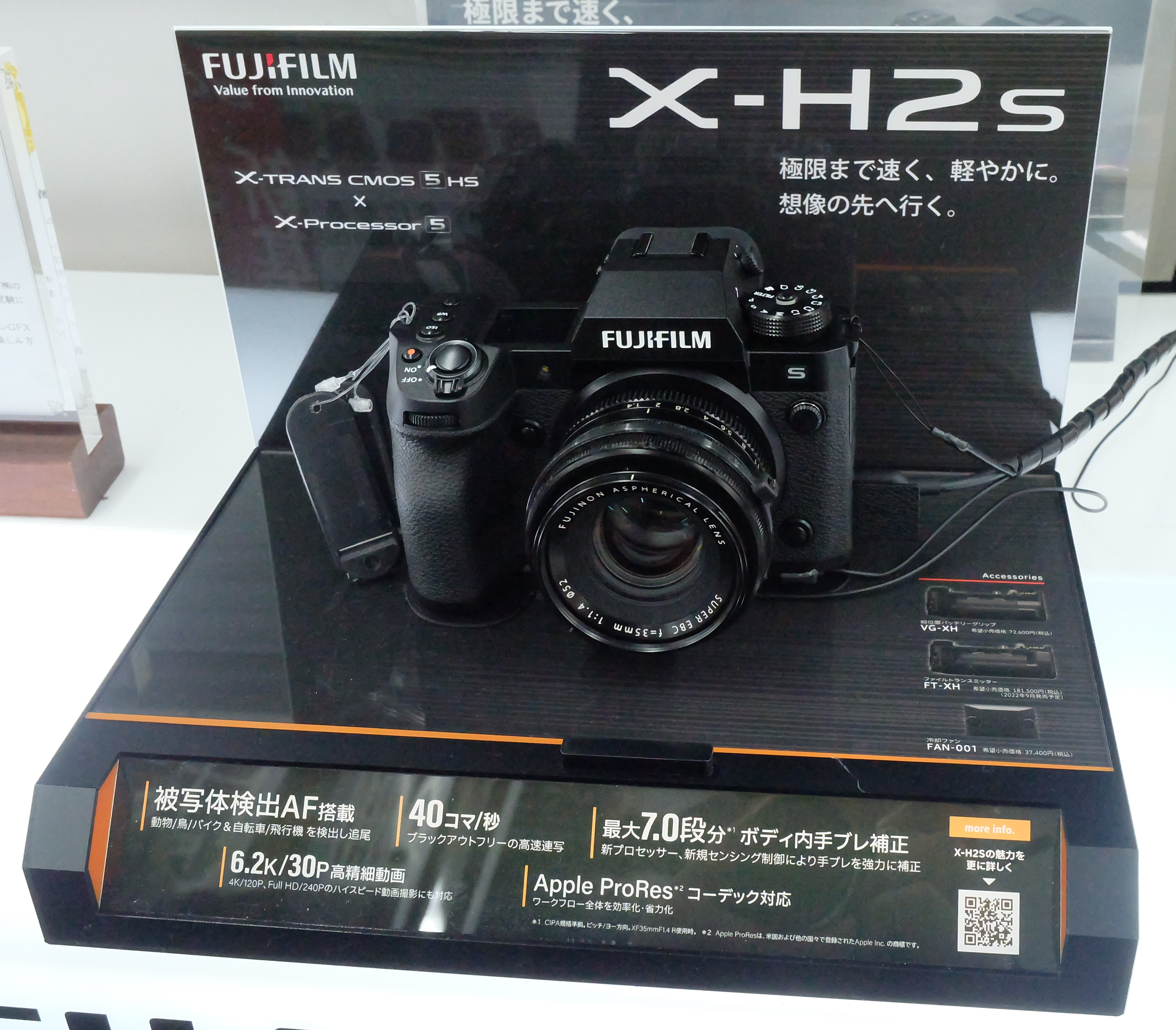

Type	Lens	2011	2012	2013	2014	2015	2016	2017	2018	2019	2020	2021	2022	2023	2024	2025	2026
MILC	G-mount; Medium format sensor							GFX 50S ^{F} ^{T}					GFX 50S II ^{F} ^{T}				
MILC	G-mount; Medium format sensor									GFX 50R ^{F} ^{T}							
MILC	G-mount; Medium format sensor										GFX 100 ^{F} ^{T}					GFX 100 II ^{F} ^{T}	
MILC	G-mount; Medium format sensor											GFX 100 IR ^{F} ^{T}					
MILC	G-mount; Medium format sensor											GFX 100S ^{F} ^{T}				GFX 100S II ^{F} ^{T}	
MILC	G-mount; Medium format sensor															GFX Eterna 55 ^{F} ^{T}	
MILC	Prime lens Medium format sensor															GFX 100RF ^{F} ^{T}	
MILC	X-mount; APS-C sensor		X-Pro1				X-Pro2				X-Pro3 ^{f} ^{T}						
MILC	X-mount; APS-C sensor								X-H1 ^{F} ^{T}					X-H2 ^{A} ^{T}			
MILC	X-mount; APS-C sensor													X-H2S ^{A} ^{T}			
MILC	X-mount; APS-C sensor											X-S10 ^{A} ^{T}			X-S20 ^{A} ^{T}		
MILC	X-mount; APS-C sensor				X-T1 ^{f}			X-T2 ^{F}		X-T3 ^{F} ^{T}		X-T4 ^{A} ^{T}		X-T5 ^{F} ^{T}			
MILC	X-mount; APS-C sensor															X-T50 ^{f} ^{T}	
MILC	X-mount; APS-C sensor						X-T10 ^{f}	X-T20 ^{f} ^{T}		X-T30 ^{f} ^{T}			X-T30 II ^{f} ^{T}			X-T30 III ^{f} ^{T}	
MILC	X-mount; APS-C sensor									_{15} X-T100 ^{F} ^{T}	X-T200 ^{A} ^{T}						
MILC	X-mount; APS-C sensor			X-E1	X-E2		X-E2s		X-E3 ^{T}			X-E4 ^{f} ^{T}				X-E5 ^{f} ^{T}	
MILC	X-mount; APS-C sensor				X-M1 ^{f}											X-M5 ^{A} ^{T}	
MILC	X-mount; APS-C sensor				X-A1 ^{f}	X-A2 ^{f}		X-A3 ^{f} ^{T}	_{15} X-A5 ^{f} ^{T}		X-A7 ^{A} ^{T}						
MILC	X-mount; APS-C sensor							X-A10 ^{f}	X-A20 ^{f} ^{T}								
Compact	Prime lens APS-C sensor	X100		X100S		X100T		X100F			X100V ^{f} ^{T}				X100VI ^{f} ^{T}		
Compact	Prime lens APS-C sensor						X70 ^{f} ^{T}			XF10 ^{T}							
Compact	Prime lens 1" sensor															X half ^{T}	
Compact	Zoom lens^{2}/_{3}" sensor		X10	X20		X30 ^{f}											
Compact	Zoom lens^{2}/_{3}" sensor				XQ1	XQ2											
Compact	Zoom lens^{2}/_{3}" sensor			XF1													
Bridge	^{2}/_{3}" sensor		X-S1 ^{f}														
Type	Lens																
Type	Lens	2011	2012	2013	2014	2015	2016	2017	2018	2019	2020	2021	2022	2023	2024	2025	2026
