= Fujifilm X-H1 =

Digital camera

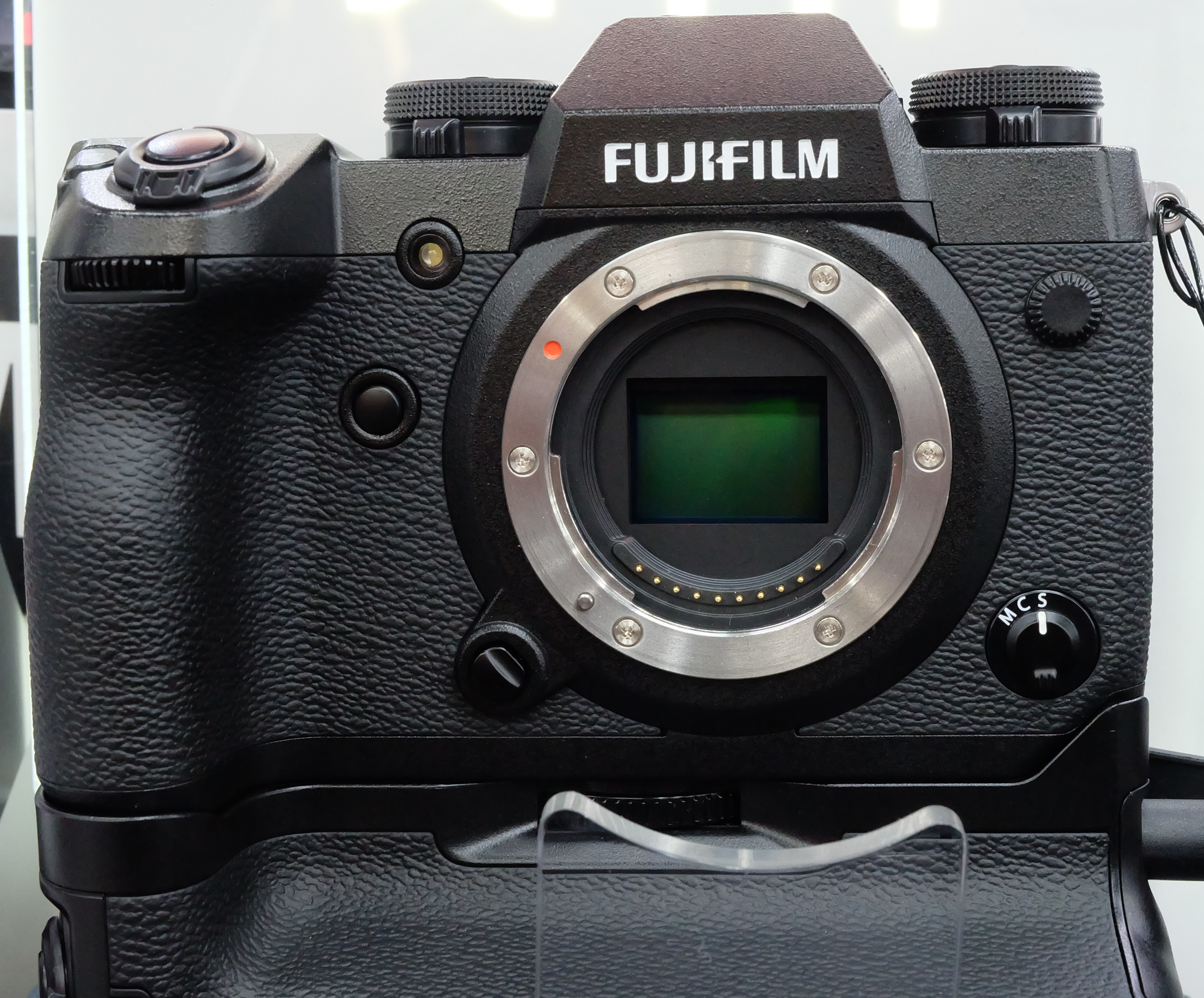
- X-H1 body

Overview
- Maker: Fujifilm
- Type: MILC
- Released: 15 February 2018; 8 years ago
- Intro price: USD 1,899 (body), USD 2,199 (bundle)

Lens
- Lens mount: Fujifilm X
- Lens: Interchangeable lens
- Compatible lenses: Fujinon

Sensor/medium
- Sensor: APS-C
- Sensor type: X-Trans CMOS III
- Sensor size: 23.6 mm × 15.6 mm
- Sensor maker: Sony
- Maximum resolution: 24.3 megapixels 6000 x 4000
- Film speed: 200–12800 (standard); 100–51200 (extend)
- Storage media: Dual slot SD, SDHC, SDXC; UHS-I, UHS-II

Focusing
- Focus: Intelligent Hybrid TTL AF contrast and phase detection
- Focus modes: Single AF, Continuous AF, Manual
- Focus areas: 91 focus point
- Focus bracketing: Auto, Manual

Exposure/metering
- Exposure: TTL 256-zone metering
- Exposure bracketing: -5.0EV - +5.0EV, 1/3EV step
- Exposure modes: Program AE, Aperture Priority AE, Shutter Speed Priority AE, Manual Exposure
- Exposure metering: Through-the-lens
- Metering modes: Multi, Spot, Average, Center Weighted

Flash
- Flash: External
- Flash synchronization: 1/250 s
- Compatible flashes: EF-X8 TTL Flash

Shutter
- Shutter: Focal Plane Shutter
- Shutter speeds: 4 s to 1/8000 s (mechanical), 4 s to 1/32000 s (electronic)
- Continuous shooting: 14.0 fps

Viewfinder
- Viewfinder: EVF with eye sensor
- Electronic viewfinder: 0.5" 3.69M dots OLED Viewfinder
- Viewfinder magnification: 0.75
- Frame coverage: 100%

Image processing
- Image processor: X-Processor III
- White balance: Auto, Custom, Preset, Fluorescent, Incandescent, Underwater
- WB bracketing: ±1, ±2, ±3
- Dynamic range bracketing: 100%, 200%, 400%

General
- Video recording: MOV; 4K up to 30 fps, 1080p up to 120 fps
- LCD screen: 3.0" 1.04M dots touchscreen variable-angle monitor
- Battery: NP-W126S Li-ion
- Optional battery packs: Vertical Power Booster Grip with 2 adaptable batteries
- AV port(s): HDMI D, ⌀3.5 mm & ⌀2.5 mm audio jack
- Data port: USB 3.0, Wi-Fi 4, Bluetooth 4.0
- Body features: Image stabilization with image sensor shift mechanism with 5-axis compensation
- Dimensions: 139.8 mm × 97.3 mm × 85.5 mm (5.50 in × 3.83 in × 3.37 in)
- Weight: 673 g (24 oz) (1.484 lb) including battery and memory card
- Made in: Japan

Chronology
- Successor: Fujifilm X-H2S, Fujifilm X-H2

The Fujifilm X-H1 is a larger mirrorless interchangeable-lens digital camera announced on February 15, 2018, by Fujifilm. It has a X-Trans CMOS III APS-C sensor and an X-Processor III processor that uses the Fujifilm X-mount. The X-H1 is a weather-resistant camera with an in-body image stabilization capable of recording 4K videos up to 30 fps with a Rec.2020 color gamut at a bitrate of 200 Mbit/s. The camera can record slow motion videos in 1080p at 120 fps.

The X-H1 is meant to begin a new line-up of larger DSLR-style mirrorless cameras. The camera is available only in black for $1,899.95. Sale began on 1 March 2018.

The X-H2S, announced on May 31, 2022, is the company's latest high-speed flagship model to succeed the X-H1. The X-H2, teased by the company on May 31, 2022 as well, will also succeed the X-H1.

== Features ==
The X-H1 is equipped with the sloped viewfinder 'prism', a top-panel LCD, and a significantly larger grip and buttons than the X-T series.

=== Key specifications ===
- 24MP X-Trans III APS-C sensor
- 5-axis in-body image stabilization with 5EV rating
- 3.69M-dot OLED viewfinder
- 3.0 inch touchscreen LCD with two-axis tilt
- DCI and UHD 4K capture at up to 200 Mbit/s
- Slow motion 1080p (from 120 and 100 fps)
- Internal F-Log capture
- Reduced blackout in continuous shooting
- Twin UHS-II-compatible card slots
- Anti-flicker shooting mode
- Wi-Fi with Bluetooth for constant connection
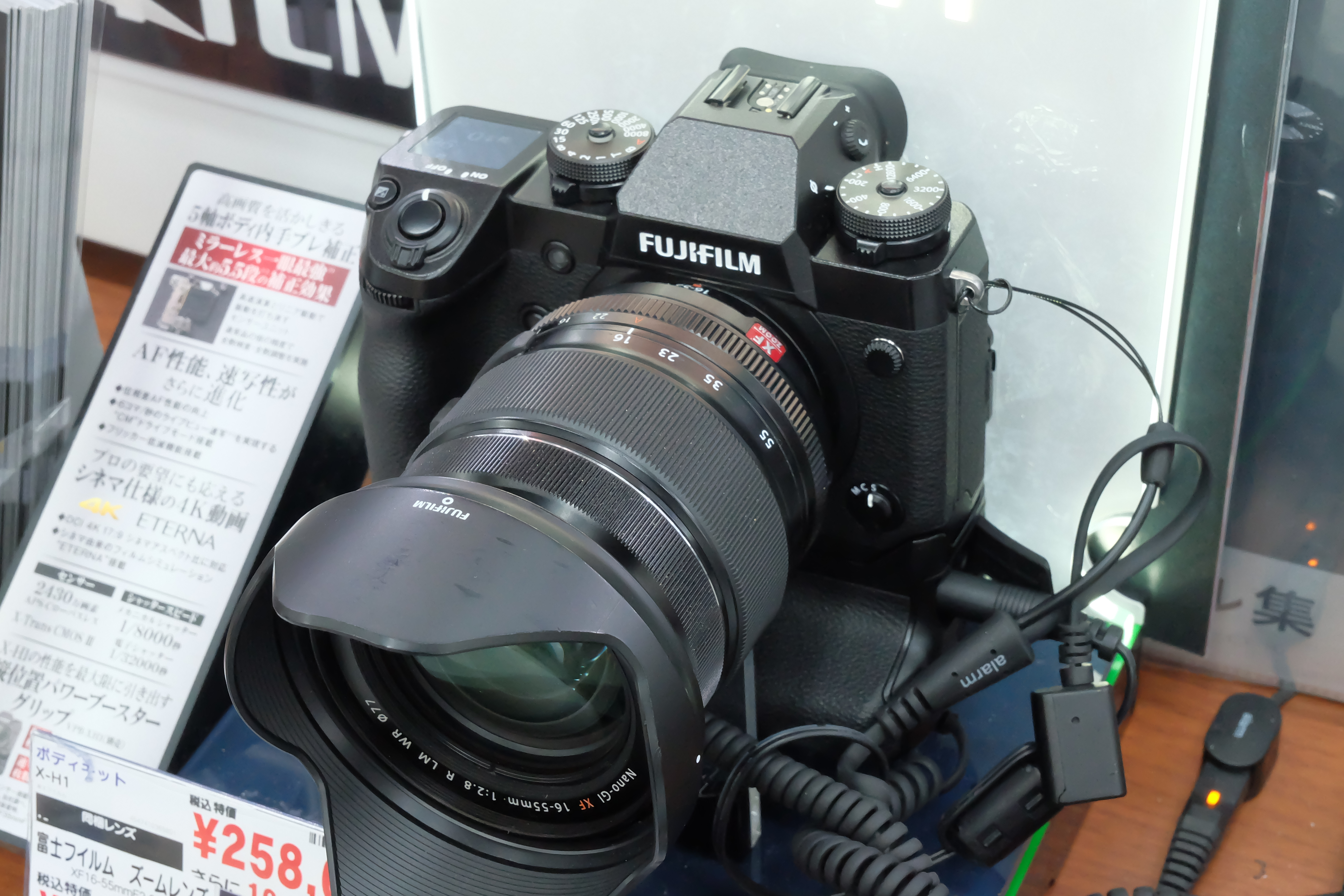

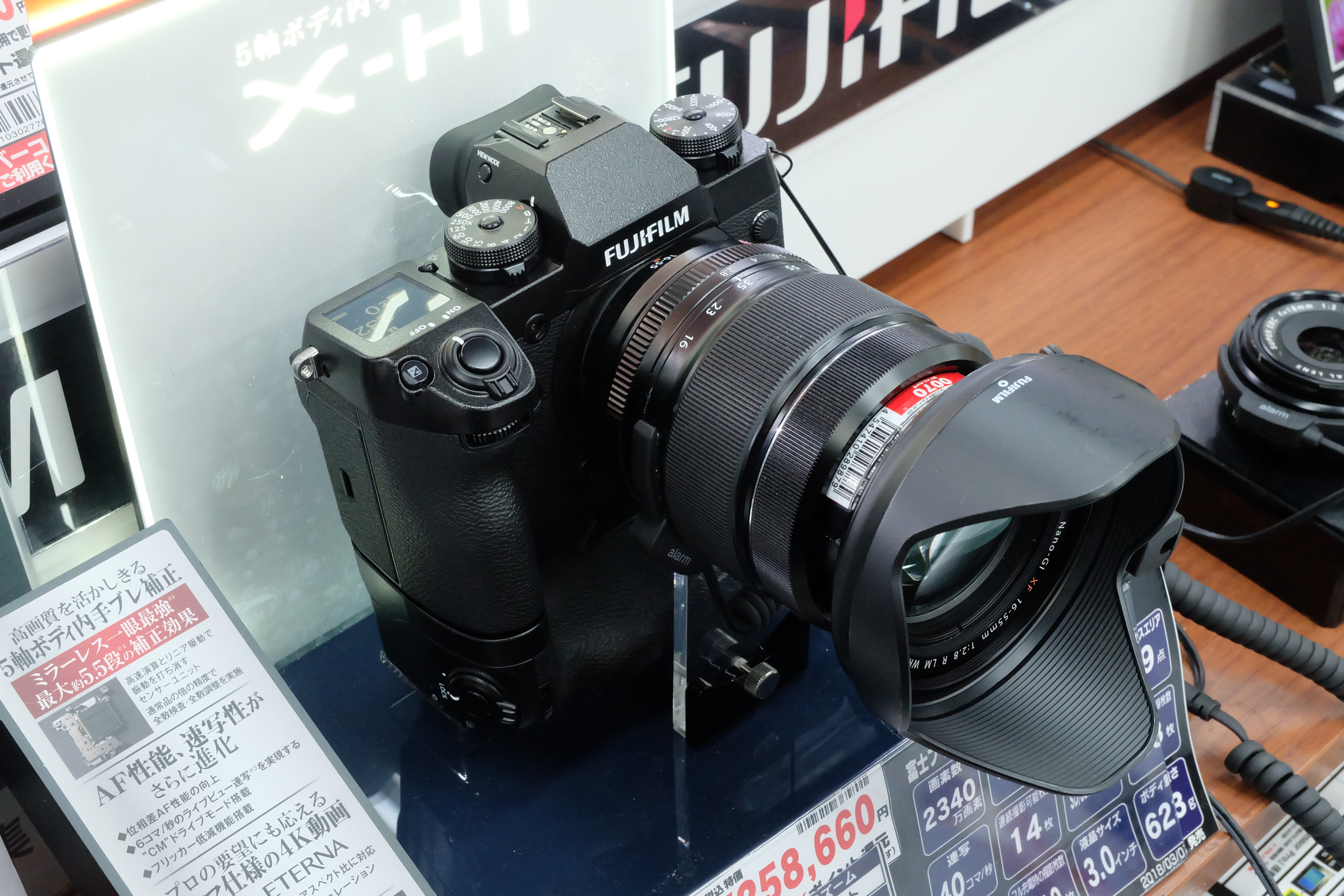

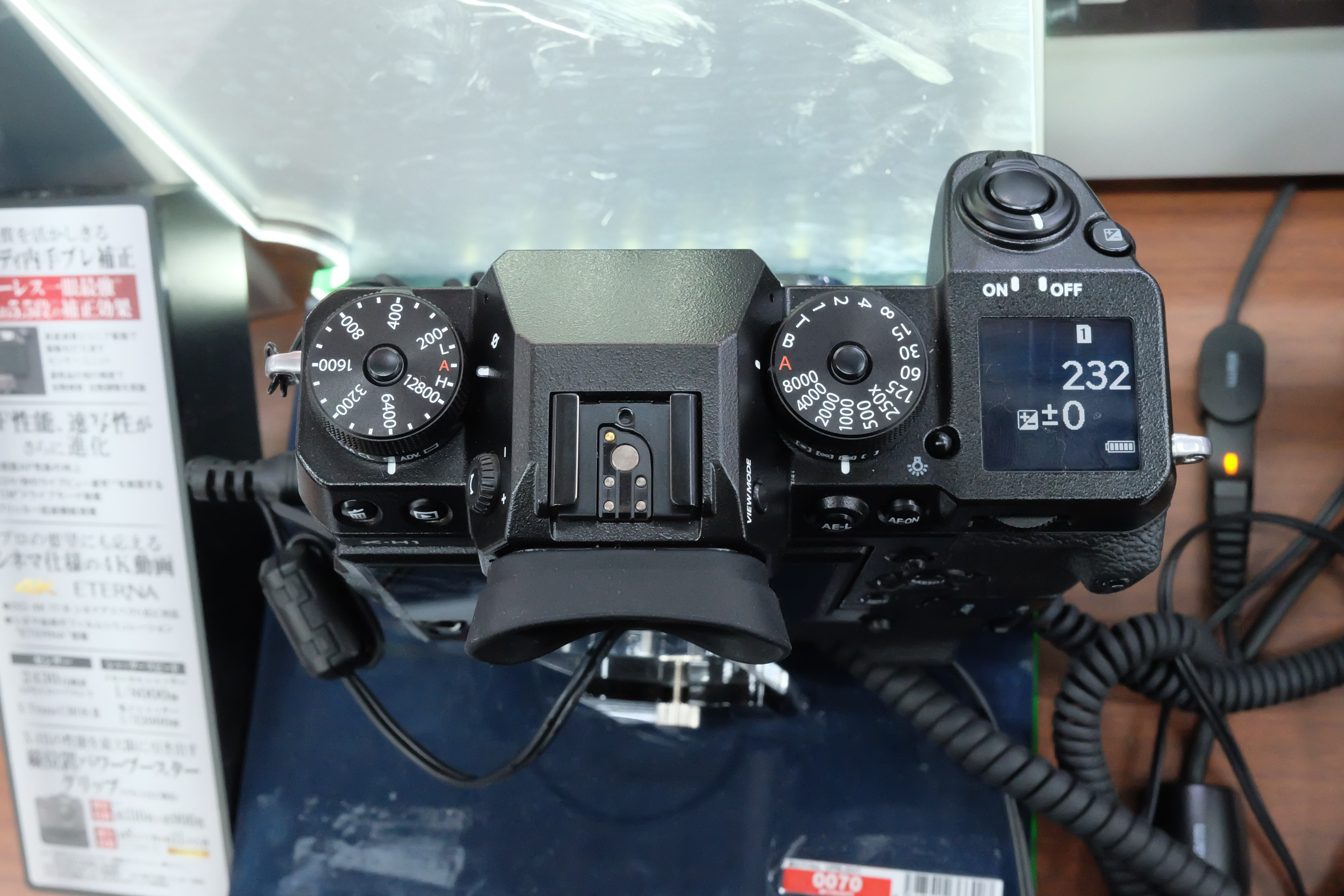

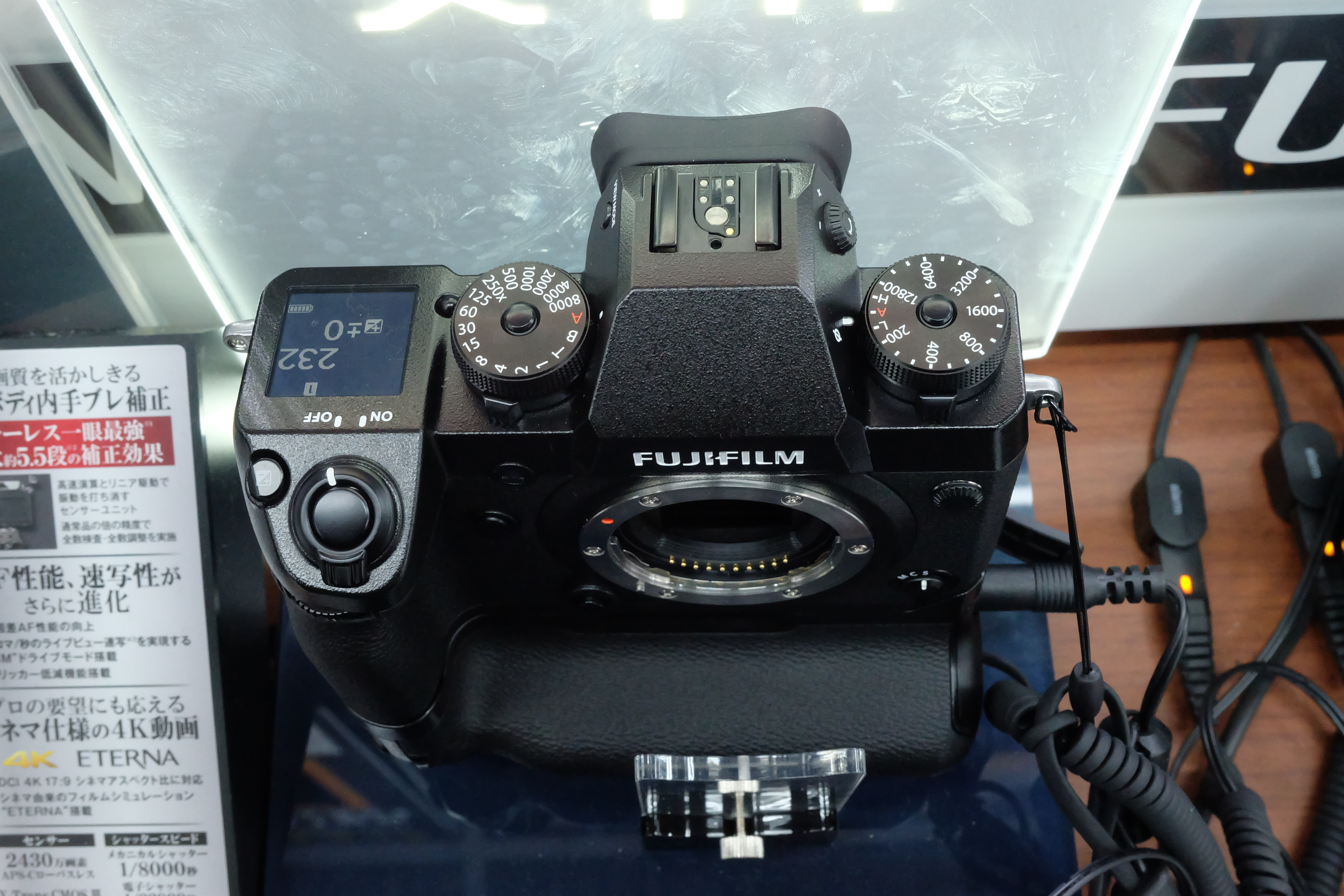

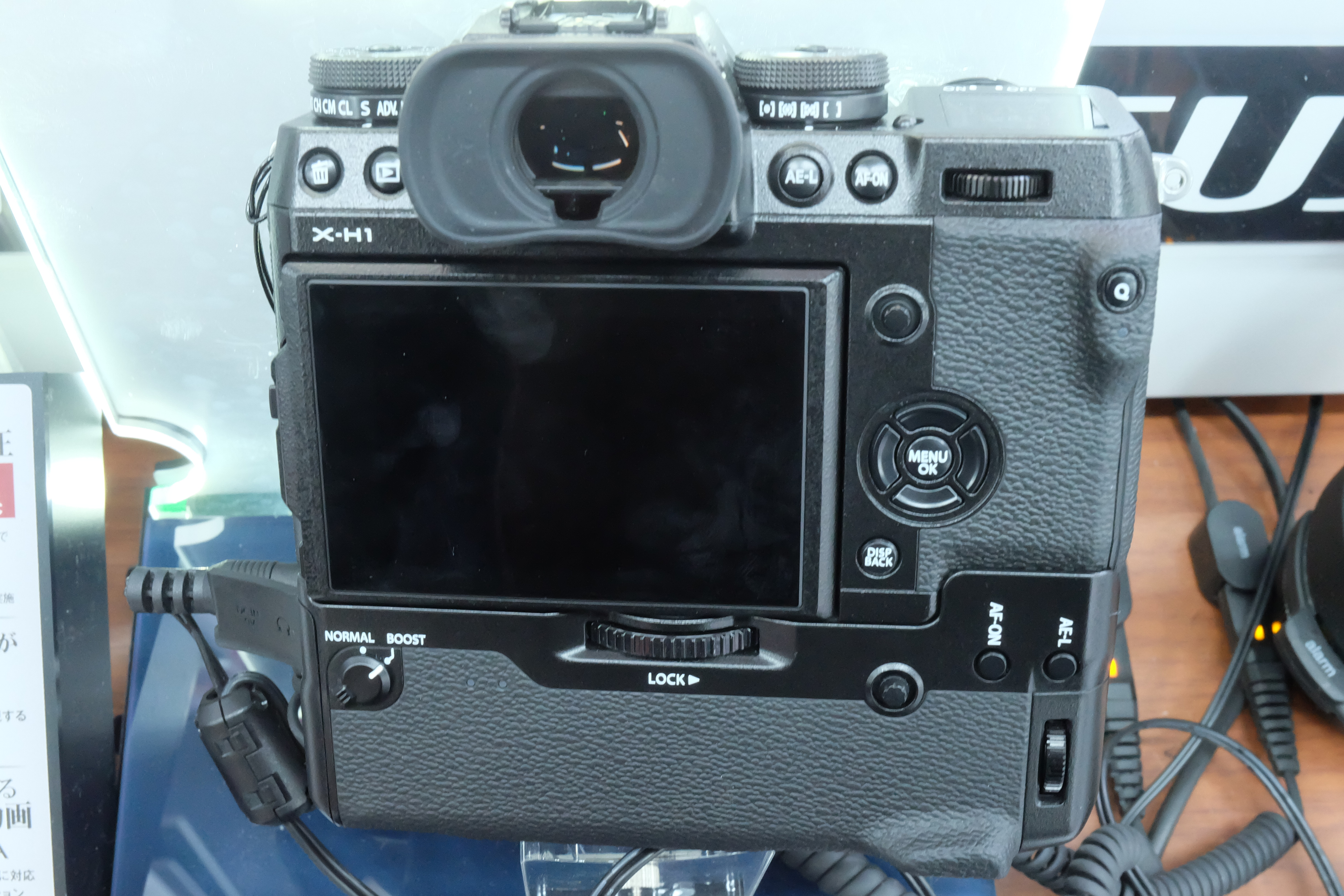

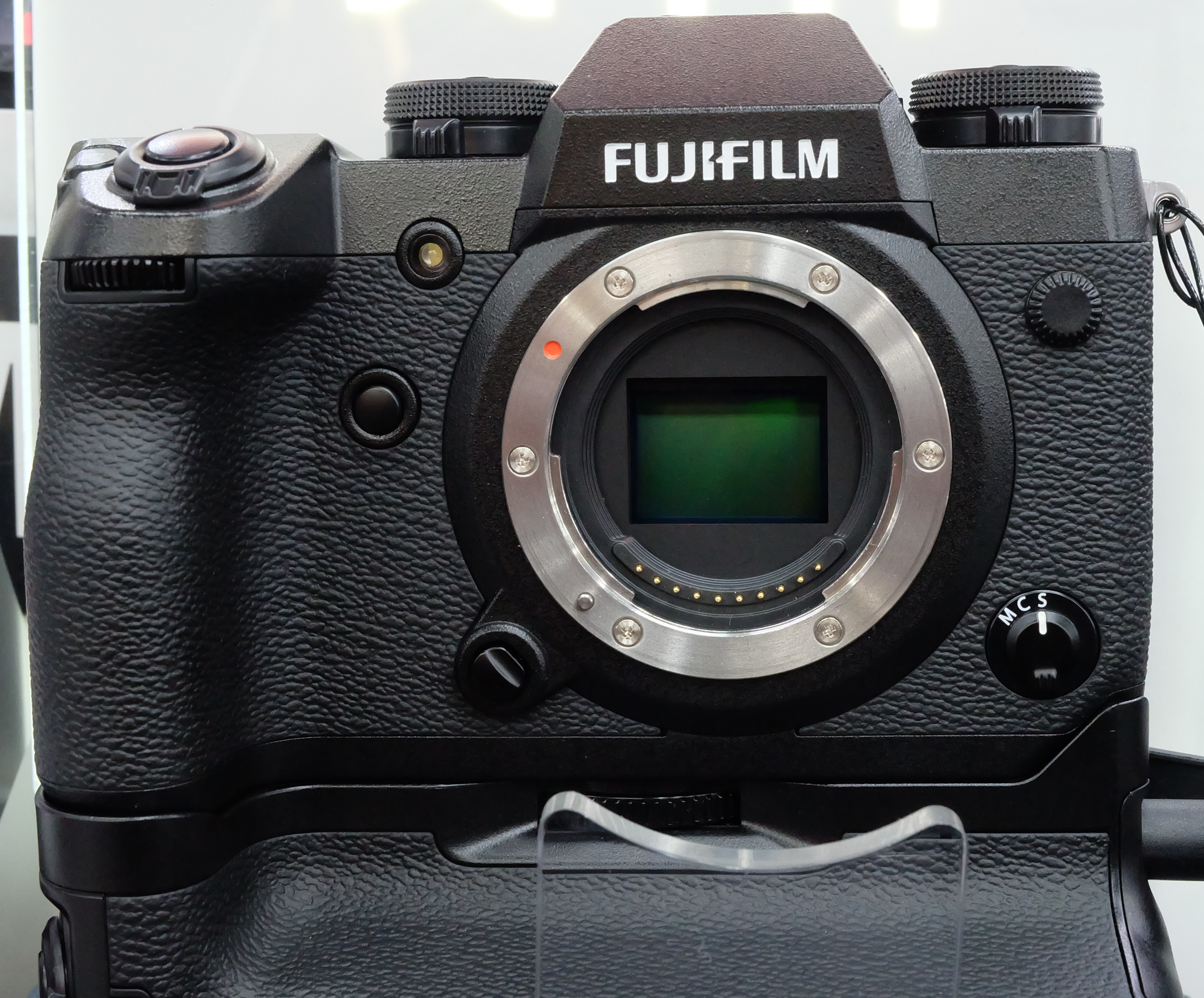

Type	Lens	2011	2012	2013	2014	2015	2016	2017	2018	2019	2020	2021	2022	2023	2024	2025
MILC	G-mount; Medium format sensor							GFX 50S ^{F} ^{T}					GFX 50S II ^{F} ^{T}			
MILC	G-mount; Medium format sensor									GFX 50R ^{F} ^{T}						
MILC	G-mount; Medium format sensor										GFX 100 ^{F} ^{T}					GFX 100 II ^{F} ^{T}
MILC	G-mount; Medium format sensor											GFX 100 IR ^{F} ^{T}				
MILC	G-mount; Medium format sensor											GFX 100S ^{F} ^{T}				GFX 100S II^{F} ^{T}
MILC	G-mount; Medium format sensor															GFX Eterna 55^{F} ^{T}
MILC	Prime lens Medium format sensor															GFX 100RF ^{F} ^{T}
MILC	X-mount; APS-C sensor		X-Pro1				X-Pro2				X-Pro3 ^{f} ^{T}					
MILC	X-mount; APS-C sensor								X-H1 ^{F} ^{T}					X-H2 ^{A} ^{T}		
MILC	X-mount; APS-C sensor													X-H2S ^{A} ^{T}		
MILC	X-mount; APS-C sensor											X-S10 ^{A} ^{T}			X-S20 ^{A} ^{T}	
MILC	X-mount; APS-C sensor				X-T1 ^{f}			X-T2 ^{F}		X-T3 ^{F} ^{T}		X-T4 ^{A} ^{T}		X-T5 ^{F} ^{T}		
MILC	X-mount; APS-C sensor						X-T10 ^{f}	X-T20 ^{f} ^{T}		X-T30 ^{f} ^{T}			X-T30 II ^{f} ^{T}			X-T50 ^{f} ^{T}
MILC	X-mount; APS-C sensor									_{15} X-T100 ^{F} ^{T}	X-T200 ^{A} ^{T}					X-T30 III ^{f} ^{T}
MILC	X-mount; APS-C sensor			X-E1	X-E2		X-E2s		X-E3 ^{T}			X-E4 ^{f} ^{T}				X-E5 ^{f} ^{T}
MILC	X-mount; APS-C sensor				X-M1 ^{f}											X-M5 ^{A} ^{T}
MILC	X-mount; APS-C sensor				X-A1 ^{f}	X-A2 ^{f}		X-A3 ^{f} ^{T}	_{15} X-A5 ^{f} ^{T}		X-A7 ^{A} ^{T}					
MILC	X-mount; APS-C sensor							X-A10 ^{f}	X-A20 ^{f} ^{T}							
Compact	Prime lens APS-C sensor	X100		X100S		X100T		X100F			X100V ^{f} ^{T}				X100VI ^{f} ^{T}	
Compact	Prime lens APS-C sensor						X70 ^{f} ^{T}			XF10 ^{T}						
Compact	Prime lens 1" sensor															X half ^{T}
Compact	Zoom lens^{2}/_{3}" sensor		X10	X20		X30 ^{f}										
Compact	Zoom lens^{2}/_{3}" sensor				XQ1	XQ2										
Compact	Zoom lens^{2}/_{3}" sensor			XF1												
Bridge	^{2}/_{3}" sensor		X-S1 ^{f}													
Type	Lens															
Type	Lens	2011	2012	2013	2014	2015	2016	2017	2018	2019	2020	2021	2022	2023	2024	2025
