= FFC =

FFC may refer to:

== Arts and media ==
- FF.C, a Greek hip hop band
- Final Fantasy Chronicles, a 2001 video game compilation
- Folklore Fellows' Communications, a folkloristics journal

== Government and politics ==
- Faith and Freedom Coalition, an American conservative advocacy organization
- Federal Flood Commission, Pakistan
- Film Finance Corporation Australia, Australia
- Flood Forecasting Centre (UK), United Kingdom
- Forces of Freedom and Change, an alliance in Sudanese
- Full Faith and Credit Clause, of the United States Constitution

== Places ==
=== United States ===
- Fairfield County, Connecticut
- Flav's Fried Chicken, Clinton, Iowa
- Atlanta Regional Airport, Georgia

=== Australia ===
- Flying Fish Cove, Christmas Island, UN/LOCODE is CX FFC

== Science and technology ==
- FFC Cambridge process, an electrochemical process
- Flat-field correction
- Flexible flat cable
- Front-facing camera
- Fee-for-carriage, in Canada

== Sports ==
=== Association football ===
- Falkirk F.C., Scotland
- Farsley F.C., England
- Farnborough F.C., England
- Fehérvár FC, Hungary
- Fiji Football Cup, Fiji
- Finaghy F.C., Northern Ireland
- Fisher F.C., England
- Floriana F.C., Malta
- Floridians FC, United States
- Fluminense Football Club, Brazil
- Foadan FC, Togo
- Fredericksburg FC, United States
- Freiburger FC, Germany
- Fulham F.C., England
- Football Fans Census, a British fan forum
- Football Federation of Cambodia
- Football Federation of Chile

=== Australian rules football ===
- Fitzroy Football Club
- Fremantle Football Club
- Footscray Football Club, now the Western Bulldogs

=== Other sports ===
- Freedom Football Conference, a defunct American college athletic conference
- French Cycling Federation (French: Fédération Française de Cyclisme)
- Final Fight Championship, a European martial arts promotion company

== Other uses ==
- Fauji Fertilizer Company Limited, a Pakistani fertilizer manufacturer
- First flight cover, mail that has been carried on an inaugural flight of an airline, route, or aircraft
- Flaherty & Crumrine Preferred Securities Income Fund Inc., a company listed on the New York Stock Exchange
- Foundation For Children, a Thai non-profit organization
- Freedom Flotilla Coalition, an international solidarity movement aiming to break the Israeli blockade of the Gaza Strip
- Fulton Financial Corporation, an American financial services company

== See also ==
- 2FC
- F2C (disambiguation)
- FC2 (disambiguation)
- FCC (disambiguation)
- FC (disambiguation)
