= FCCC =

FCCC may refer to:

- Faculty Council of Community Colleges, State University of New York, New York State, USA
- Faith Chapel Christian Center, Birmingham, Alabama, USA; a megachurch
- First Centennial Clark Corporation, a Philippine government-owned and controlled corporation
- Flint Cultural Center Corporation, the operating company for Flint Cultural Center, Flint, Michigan, USA
- Flooding Creek Community Church, Sale, Victoria, Australia; an evangelical church in Gippsland
- Florida Civil Commitment Center, Arcadia, DeSoto County, Florida, USA; a correctional facility
- Flower City Chaplain Corps, a U.S. non-profit charity giving chaplaincy counseling at crime scenes
- Foreign Correspondents' Club of China
- Foundation for California Community Colleges (FCCC, FoundationCCC), a non-profit in California, USA
- Four County Career Center, Archibald, Ridgeville Township, Henry County, Ohio; a vocational school serving the school districts for the counties of Defiance, Fulton, Henry, Williams
- United Nations Framework Convention on Climate Change (UNFCCC, UN FCCC, FCCC)
- Freightliner Custom Chassis Corp., a division of Freightliner Trucks
- Brazzaville FIR (ICAO region code FCCC), Republic of the Congo; a flight information region
- Brazzaville ACC (ICAO area code FCCC), Republic of the Congo; an area control center
- Fundação Cacique Cobra Coral, a Brazilian mystical organization

== See also ==
- CCCF (disambiguation)
- FFFC
- FCC (disambiguation)
- FC (disambiguation)
