= FCCS =

FCCS may refer to:

- Faculty of Communication and Cultural Studies (FCCS), University for Development Studies (UDS), Tamale, Ghana
- Faculty of Creative and Critical Studies (FCCS), University of British Columbia Okanagan (UBC-O), Kelowna, Okanagan, British Columbia, Canada
- Christian Federation of Salvadoran Peasants (FCCS; Spanish: Federación Cristiana de Campesinos Salvadoreños)
- Federation of Culture, Communication and Entertainment (FCCS; French: Fédération de la culture, communication et spectacle), a union of France that is part of the trade union alliance French Confederation of Management – General Confederation of Executives (CFE-CGC)
- Fluorescence cross-correlation spectroscopy (FCCS)
- French Chamber of Commerce in Singapore (FCCS); see France–Singapore relations
- Fuel Characteristic Classification System (FCCS)

== See also ==
- FCC (disambiguation) for the singular of FCCs
- FCS (disambiguation)
