= CCCF =

CCCF may refer to:

- Confederación Centroamericana y del Caribe de Fútbol, the governing body of association football in Central America and the Caribbean until 1961
- CCCF Championship, an association football tournament for teams in the area of Central America and the Caribbean, 1941–1961
  - CCCF Youth Championship, a soccer tournament 1954–1960
- Canadian Child Care Federation, largest Canadian national service based early learning and child care organization
- Chaos Computer Club France, a fake hacker organization created in 1989 in Lyon, France
- Coffee Creek Correctional Facility, a women's prison and prisoner intake center in Wilsonville, Oregon
- Cold Creek Correctional Facility, a Tennessee Department of Correction prison
- Communauté de communes du Canton de Fauquembergues

== See also ==
- CCF (disambiguation)
- CCCCF
- CFFF
- FCCC
- FFFC
