= FCS =

FCS may refer to:

== Education ==
- Faith Christian School (disambiguation)
- Faujdarhat Collegiate School, in Chittagong, Bangladesh
- Florence Christian School in South Carolina, United States
- Florida College System, in the United States
- Foothills Christian Schools, in San Diego County, California, United States
- Forsyth County Schools in Georgia, United States
- Franklin College Switzerland, an American college in Switzerland
- Friendship Christian School (disambiguation)
- Friends' Central School, in Pennsylvania, United States

== Sports ==
- Football Championship Subdivision, an American football classification in the NCAA in the United States for college football
- Fox College Sports, an American television sport network

=== Association football clubs ===
- 1. FC Saarbrücken, in Germany
- FC Red Bull Salzburg, in Austria
- FC Schaffhausen, in Switzerland
- 1. FC Schweinfurt 05, in Germany
- 1. FC Slovácko, in the Czech Republic
- FC South End, in Trinidad and Tobago
- FC Strausberg, in Germany
- F.C. Südtirol, in Italy

== Technology ==
- Fairchild Semiconductor, an American semiconductor company
- FCS Control Systems, a Dutch aerospace company
- Fibre Channel switch
- Fighter catapult ship
- Fin control system
- Final Cut Studio
- Fire-control system
- Flight control system
- Flight control surfaces
- Flow Cytometry Standard
- Fluorescence correlation spectroscopy
- Food contacting substances
- Frame check sequence, communication error detection
- Fusion Camera System
- Future Combat Systems

== Other uses ==
- Chalmers Naval Architecture Students' Society (Swedish: Föreningen Chalmers Skeppsbyggare)
- Faller Car System, a kind of slot cars, see Faller#Faller Car System
- Family and consumer science
- Federation of Conservative Students, a former student wing of the British Conservative Party
- Fellow of the Chemical Society (postnomial)
- Ferrocarril del Sur (English: Peru Southern Railway), a former Peruvian railway company
- Fetal calf serum
- Foreign Commercial Service of the United States Department of Commerce
- Fraser Commando School, an Australian training facility
- The "favourable conservation status" of protected habitats and species in the European Union's Habitats Directive
- First customer shipment (ship, shipping), the stage in hardware or software development process when a certain product or a version thereof is provided to the customers for the first time

== See also ==
- FC (disambiguation)
