= Companies listed on the New York Stock Exchange (F) =

== F ==
Stock name	Symbol	Country of origin
Fabrinet	FN	Thailand
FactSet Research Systems Inc.	FDS	US
Fair Isaac Corporation	FICO	US
Family Dollar Stores Inc.	FDO	US
Farfetch, Ltd.	FTCH	Portugal
FBL Financial Group Inc.	FFG	US
Federal Agricultural Mortgage Corporation	AGM	US
Federal Agricultural Mortgage Corporation	AGM.A	US
Federal Agricultural Mortgage Corporation	AGM.PRA	US
Federal Agricultural Mortgage Corporation	AGM.PRB	US
Federal Agricultural Mortgage Corporation	AGM.PRC	US
Federal Realty Investment Trust	FRT	US
Federal Signal Corporation	FSS	US
Federated Enhanced Treasury Income Fund	FTT	US
Federated Investors Inc.	FII	US
Federated Premier Intermediate Municipal Income Fund	FPT	US
Federated Premier Municipal Income Fund	FMN	US
FedEx Corporation	FDX	US
FelCor Lodging Trust	FCH	US
FelCor Lodging Trust Inc.	FCH.PRA	US
FelCor Lodging Trust Inc.	FCH.PRC	US
Ferrellgas Partners L.P	FGP	US
Ferro Corporation	FOE	US
Fibria Celulose S.A.	FBR	Brazil
Fidelity & Guaranty Life	FGL	US
Fidelity National Financial Inc.	FNF	US
Fidelity National Information Services, Inc.	FIS	US
Fiduciary/Claymore MLP Opportunity Fund	FMO	US
Fifth Street Finance Corp.	FSCE	US
FinVolution Group	FINV	China
First Acceptance Corporation	FAC	US
First American Financial Corporation	FAF	US
First BanCorp	FBP	Puerto Rico
First Commonwealth Financial Corporation	FCF	US
First Horizon National Corporation	FHN	US
First Horizon National Corporation	FHN.PRA	US
First Industrial Realty Trust, Inc.	FR	US
First Majestic Silver Corp.	AG	US
The First Marblehead Corporation	FMD	US
First Niagara Financial Group, Inc.	FNFG.PRB	US
First Preferred Capital Trust IV	FBS.PRA	US
First Republic Bank	FRC	US
First Republic Bank	FRC.PRA	US
First Republic Bank	FRC.PRB	US
First Republic Bank	FRC.PRC	US
First Republic Bank	FRC.PRD	US
First Republic Bank	FRC.PRE	US
First Trust Dividend and Income Fund	FAV	US
First Trust Energy Infrastructure Fund	FIF	US
First Trust Enhanced Equity Income Fund	FFA	US
First Trust High Income Long/Short Fund	FSD	US
First Trust Intermediate Duration Preferred & Income Fund	FPF	US
First Trust MLP and Energy Income Fund	FEI	US
First Trust Mortgage Income Fund	FMY	US
First Trust New Opportunities MLP & Energy Fund	FPL	US
First Trust Senior Floating Rate Income Fund II	FCT	US
First Trust Strategic High Income Fund II	FHY	US
First Trust/Aberdeen Emerging Opportunity Fund	FEO	US
First Trust/Aberdeen Global Opportunity Income Fund	FAM	US
First Trust/Gallatin Specialty Finance and Financial Opportunities Fund	FGB	US
FirstEnergy Corp	FE	US
FirstMerit Corporation	FMER.PRA	US
Five Oaks Investment Corp.	OAKS	US
Five Oaks Investment Corp.	OAKS.PRA	US
Five Star Quality Care, Inc.	FVE	US
Fixed Income Trust For Goldman Sachs Subordinated Notes, Series 2011-1	TFG	US
Flagstar Bancorp, Inc.	FBC	US
Flaherty & Crumrine Dynamic Preferred and Income Fund Incorporated	DFP	US
Flaherty & Crumrine Preferred Income Fund Incorporated	PFD	US
Flaherty & Crumrine Preferred Income Opportunity Fund Incorporated	PFO	US
Flaherty & Crumrine Preferred Securities Income Fund Incorporated	FFC	US
Flaherty & Crumrine Total Return Fund Incorporated	FLC	US
Fleetcor Technologies, Inc.	FLT	US
Fleetmatics Group PLC	FLTX	US
Flotek Industries, Inc.	FTK	US
Flowers Foods, Inc.	FLO	US
Flowserve Corporation	FLS	US
Fluor Corporation	FLR	US
Fly Leasing Limited	FLY	Ireland
FMC Corporation	FMC	US
FMC Technologies, Inc.	FTI	US
F.N.B. Corporation	FNB	US
F.N.B. Corporation	FNB.PRE	US
Fomento Economico Mexicano, S.A.B. De C.V.	FMX	Mexico
Foot Locker, Inc.	FL	US
Ford Motor Company	F	US
Foresight Energy Partners LP	FELP	US
Forest City Enterprises, Inc.	FCE.A	US
Forest City Enterprises, Inc.	FCE.B	US
Forest Oil Corporation	FST	US
Forestar Group Inc.	FOR	US
Fort Dearborn Income Securities, Inc.	FDI	US
Fortegra Financial Corporation	FRF	US
Fortress Investment Group LLC	FIG	US
Fortuna Silver Mines Inc.	FSM	US
Fortune Brands Home & Security, Inc.	FBHS	US
Forum Energy Technologies, Inc.	FET	US
Franco-Nevada Corporation	FNV	US
Franklin Covey Company	FC	US
Franklin Resources Inc.	BEN	US
Franklin Universal Trust	FT	US
Frank's International N.V.	FI	US
Freeport-McMoRan Inc.	FCX	US
Freescale Semiconductor, Ltd.	FSL	US
Fresenius Medical Care AG & Co. KGAA	FMS	Germany
Fresh Del Monte Produce Inc.	FDP	Cayman Islands
Frontline Ltd.	FRO	Bermuda
FS KKR Capital Corp.	FSK	US
FTI Consulting, Inc.	FCN	US
Furmanite Corporation	FRM	US
Fusion-io, Inc.	FIO	US
FutureFuel Corp.	FF	US
FXCM Inc.	FXCM	US
