= Honda Civic (tenth generation) =

Tenth generation of Honda Civic

Honda Civic Tenth generation
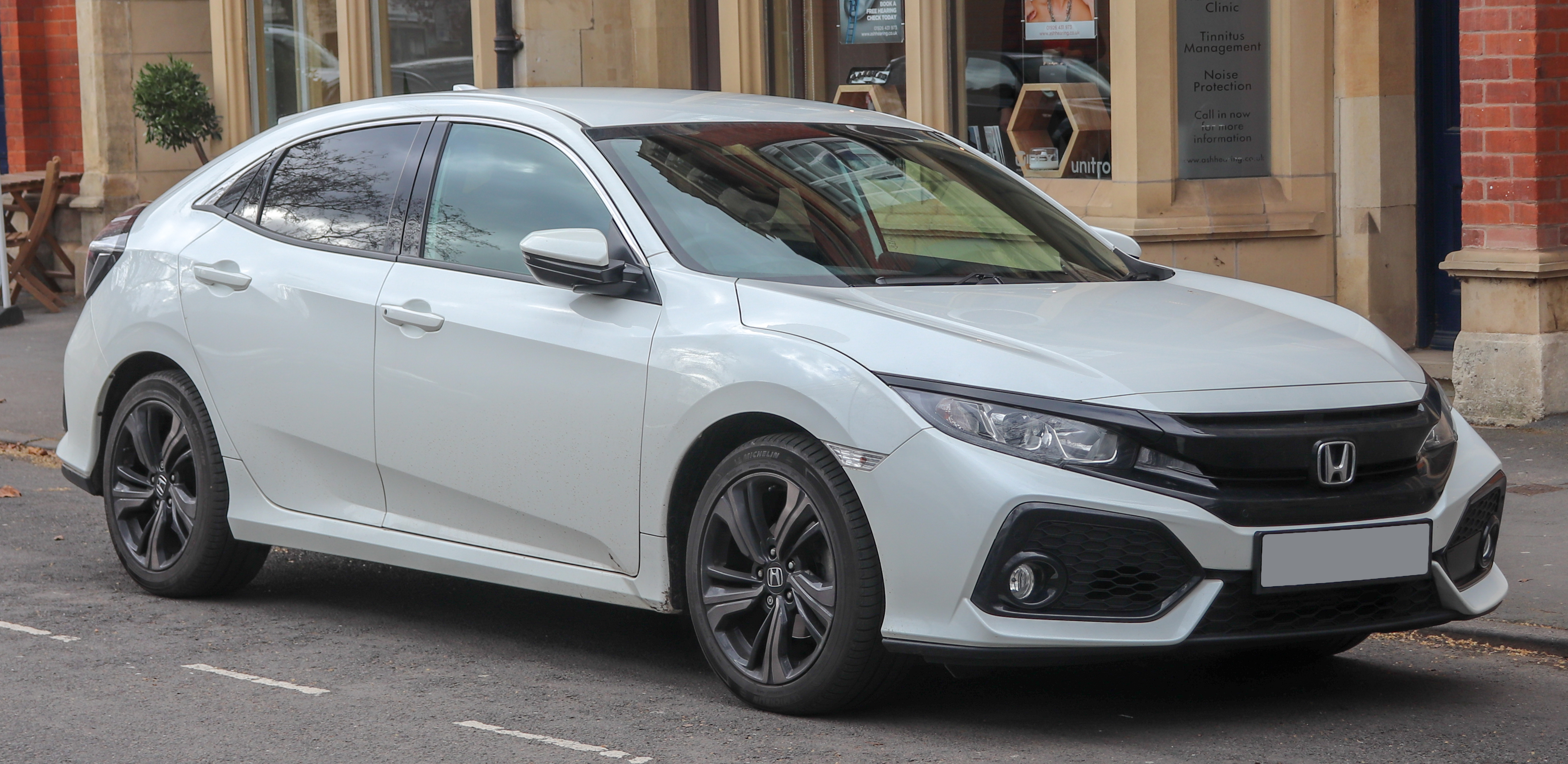
- 2017 Honda Civic hatchback (UK; pre-facelift)

Overview
- Manufacturer: Honda
- Model code: FC/FK
- Production: 2016–2021
- Model years: 2016–2021; 2016–2020 (coupe)
- Assembly: Japan: Yorii, Saitama; United States: Greensburg, Indiana (HMIN); Canada: Alliston, Ontario (HCM); United Kingdom: Swindon (HUM); Turkey: Gebze (Honda Türkiye); China: Wuhan (Dongfeng Honda); Thailand: Prachinburi; Malaysia: Alor Gajah, Melaka; India: Greater Noida (HCIL) (2019–2020); Brazil: Sumaré; Pakistan: Lahore (Honda Atlas)
- Designer: Jarad Hall (sedan); Guy Melville-Brown (coupe); Toshinobu Minami (hatchback)

Body and chassis
- Class: Compact car (C)
- Body style: 2-door coupe (FC3/FC4, North America); 4-door sedan (FC1/FC2/FC5/FC6); 5-door hatchback (FK4/FK7/FK8)
- Layout: Front-engine, front-wheel-drive
- Platform: CCA
- Related: Honda Insight (third generation); Honda CR-V (fifth generation)

Powertrain
- Engine: Petrol: 1.0 L P10A2 I3 turbo; 1.5 L L15B7 I4 turbo; 1.6 L R16B I4; 1.8 L R18Z1 I4; 2.0 L K20C2 I4; 2.0 L K20C1 I4 turbo (Type R); Diesel: 1.6 L N16 i-DTEC I4 turbo
- Transmission: CVT; 6-speed manual; 9-speed ZF 9HP automatic; (diesel)

Dimensions
- Wheelbase: 2,700 mm (106.3 in)
- Length: 4,492 mm (176.9 in) (coupe); 4,519–4,557 mm (177.9–179.4 in) (hatchback); 4,630–4,662 mm (182.3–183.5 in) (sedan)
- Width: 1,799 mm (70.8 in); 1,877 mm (73.9 in) (Type R)
- Height: 1,395 mm (54.9 in) (coupe); 1,429–1,435 mm (56.3–56.5 in) (hatchback); 1,416 mm (55.7 in) (sedan)
- Curb weight: 1,242–1,310 kg (2,738–2,888 lb) (coupe); 1,277–1,362 kg (2,815–3,003 lb) (hatchback); 1,244–1,326 kg (2,743–2,923 lb) (sedan)

Chronology
- Predecessor: Honda Civic (ninth generation)
- Successor: Honda Civic (eleventh generation); Honda Insight (third generation) (Japan, sedan); Honda Prelude (sixth generation) (coupe)

The tenth-generation Honda Civic (FC/FK) is a compact car (C-segment) manufactured by Honda from 2015 until 2022, replacing the ninth-generation Civic. It was first released in November 2015 in the North American market, followed by its introduction in Europe and Asia-Pacific in 2016, and in Japan in 2017. This generation marked the unification of the Civic range, as Honda ceased making a dedicated version for the European market—a strategy employed since the sixth-generation—in favour of a globally marketed model. As the result, three body styles were introduced with a near-identical design which are sedan, hatchback, and coupe.

A Type R version based on the hatchback model was released as a prototype model in September 2016, and has been sold from 2017 in several markets, including North America which received the Civic Type R model for the first time.

== Overview ==
The tenth-generation Civic was designated as a global model, which improved development efficiency and gained cost savings. In turn, Honda allocated the cost savings to improve the performance and quality of the vehicle. During development, Honda targeted the model at the key U.S. market, resurrecting its once-discarded "lead-country" system, which calls for developing a model specifically for its main targeted market but selling it in other regions as well.

Honda's resultant compact global platform for the tenth-generation Civic adopts a sleeker, more sporty fastback design.

The tenth-generation Civic utilizes higher grade steel than the previous model, the unit body is 68 lb (31 kg) lighter, while new body sealing techniques resulted in a 58 percent reduction in cabin air leaks. Rear disc brakes are also made standard. To minimize NVH, the Civic adds fluid-filled suspension bushings. A dual pinion steering system is introduced along with a thicker and more rigid 1.2 in (30 mm) diameter steering column for improved steering feel; additionally, the steering gear ratio is variable, with 2.2 turns lock-to-lock compared to 3.1 turns lock-to-lock from the previous model and a quicker 10.93:1 steering ratio.

The suspension is also completely redesigned, with a revamped MacPherson struts for the front suspension and a new multi-link rear setup mounted to an ultra-rigid rear subframe. The suspension is also lower, which combined with a lower floor and engine, allows the centre of gravity to be reduced by 0.6 in (15 mm). Other features aimed at improving the ride and handling include hydraulic compliance bushings, variable gear ratio steering, larger front and rear stabilizer bars, and brake-based torque vectoring. A single-tier instrument cluster also returns in this generation, replacing the previous “two-tier” design used in the last two generations.

== Body styles ==
=== Hatchback ===
The Civic Hatchback prototype model was unveiled at the 2016 Geneva Motor Show, while production version was unveiled at the 2016 Paris Motor Show. It was developed jointly by Honda R&D teams in Europe and Japan, and manufactured in its Swindon plant in the UK, Prachinburi plant in Thailand, and in China by Dongfeng Honda. Canadian and USA models went on sale in September 2016 for the 2017 model year, sourcing the vehicles from the UK, the first time that hatchback was available in North America since the seventh generation Civic.

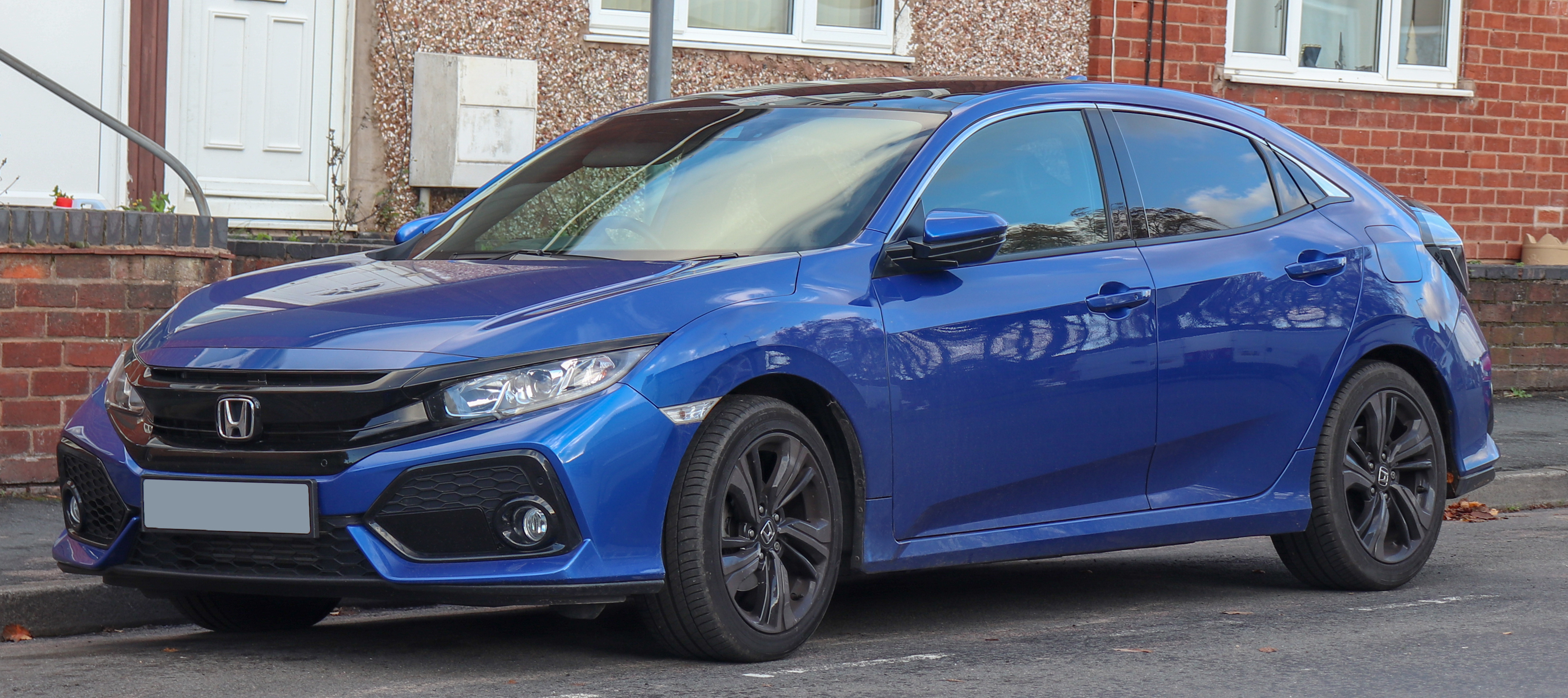
Front view

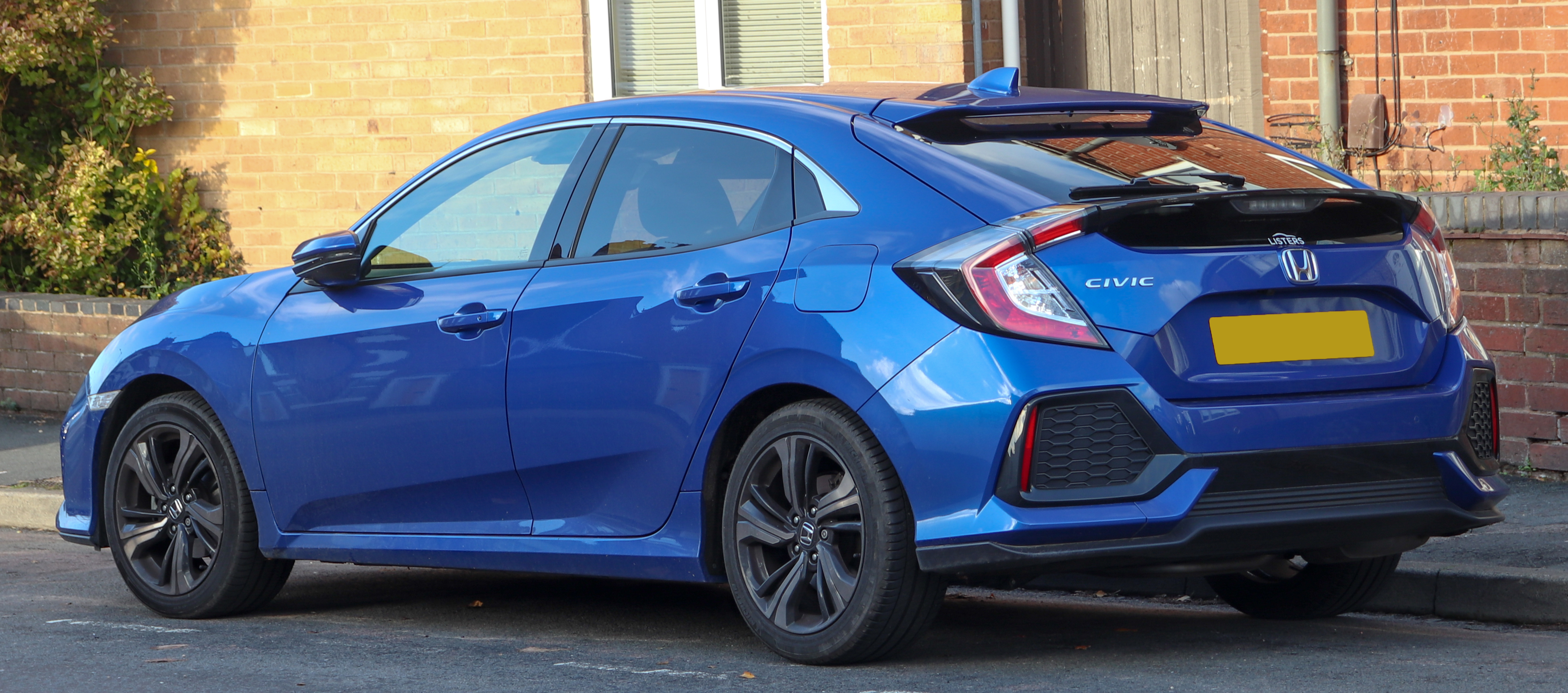
Rear view

=== Sedan ===
The production sedan model debuted for North American market on September 16, 2015. Compared to the previous generation, the tenth-generation Civic sedan is 74 mm (2.9 in) longer, 46 mm (1.8 in) wider, and 20 mm (0.8 in) lower with a 30 mm (1.2 in) longer wheelbase. It also introduces an additional 3.7 cu ft (105 L) of interior space with 2 in (51 mm) of added second row legroom compared to the outgoing model, and the trunk space has been increased by 2.6 cu ft (74 L) with a lower liftover height.

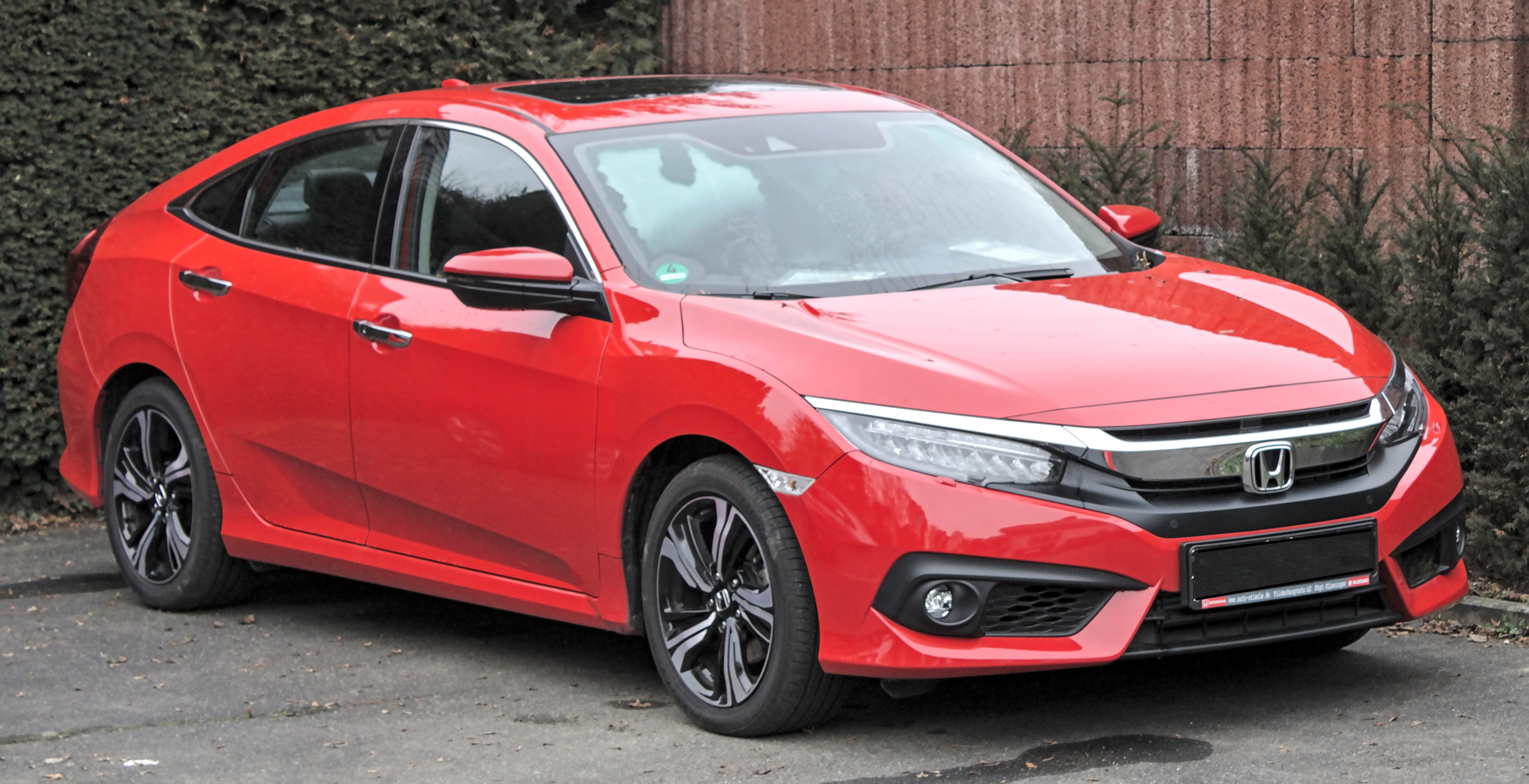
Front view

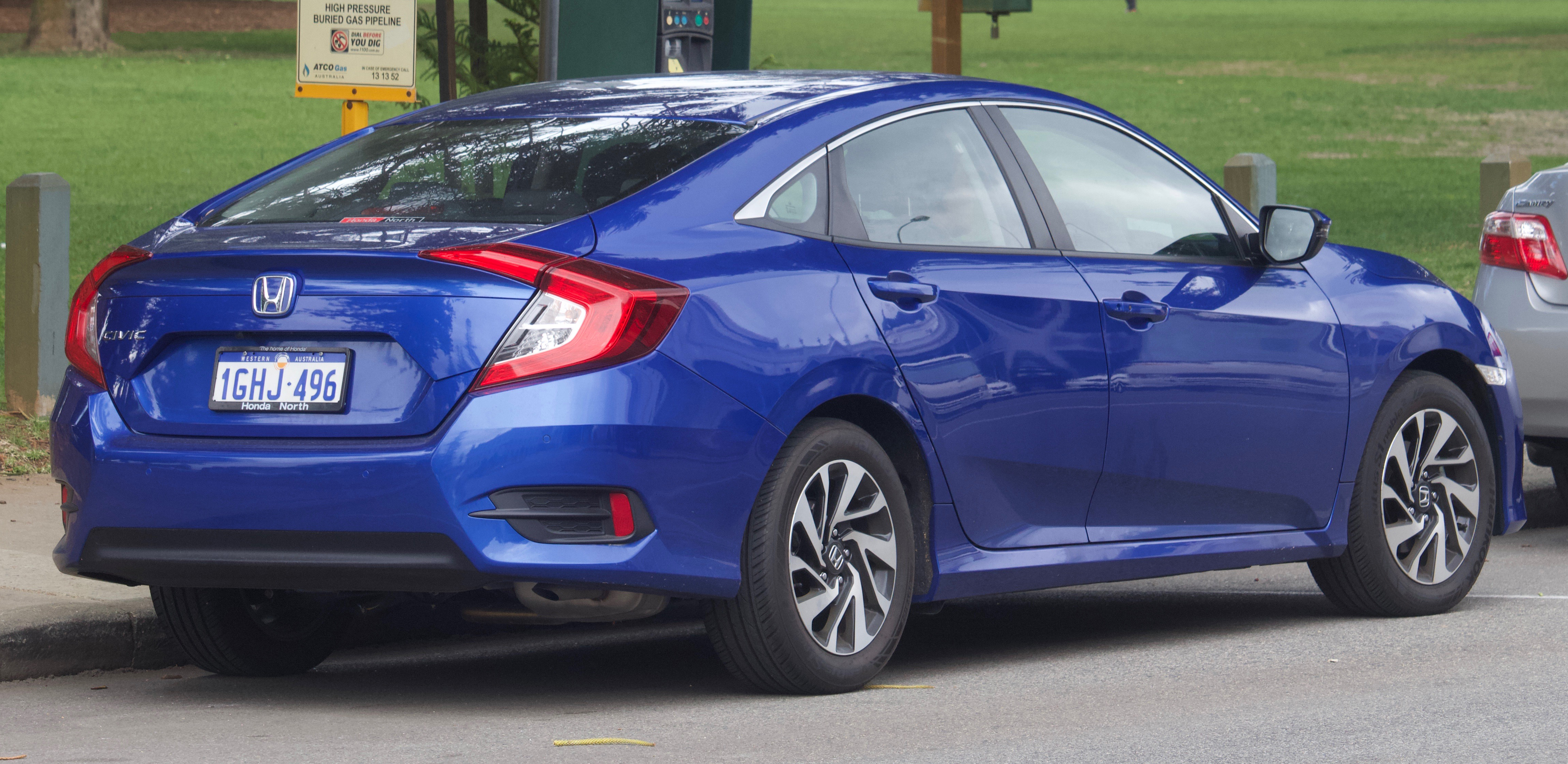
Rear view

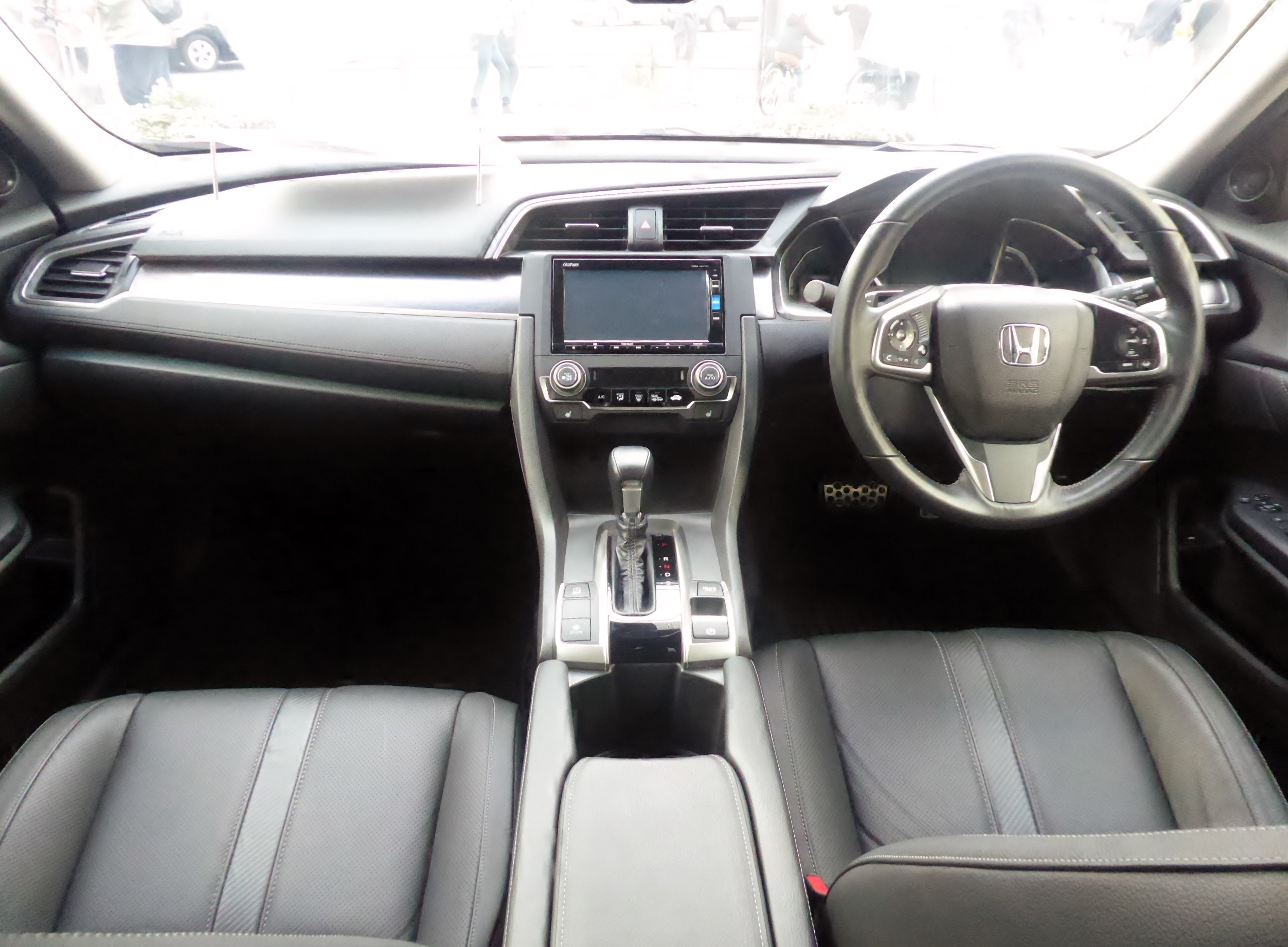
Interior

=== Coupe ===
The Civic Concept was unveiled in April 2015 at the New York International Auto Show. The production coupe was unveiled at the 2015 Los Angeles Auto Show in November, sales began during March 2016. Offered only in North America, the coupe version offered two engine options, including a 1.5-litre turbo. The coupe version offered a stylistic difference compared to its sedan counterpart.

According to Honda, the tenth-generation Civic coupe made up around 16 percent of sales when it debuted in 2016, before dropping to 6 percent during 2020. The coupe was discontinued in July 2020 making 2020 the final model year available due to low sales, and no coupe was made available for the eleventh-generation Civic.

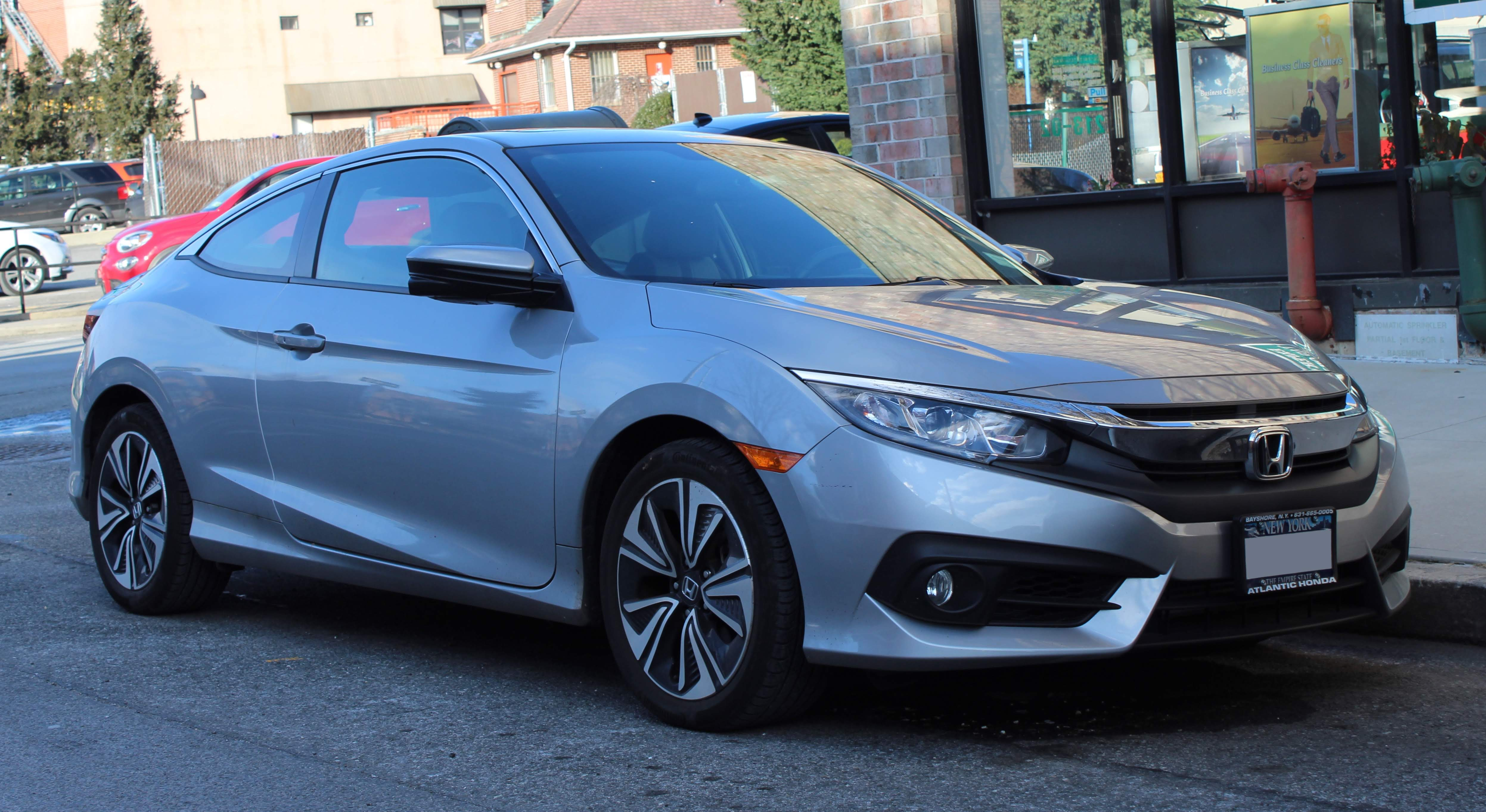
Front view

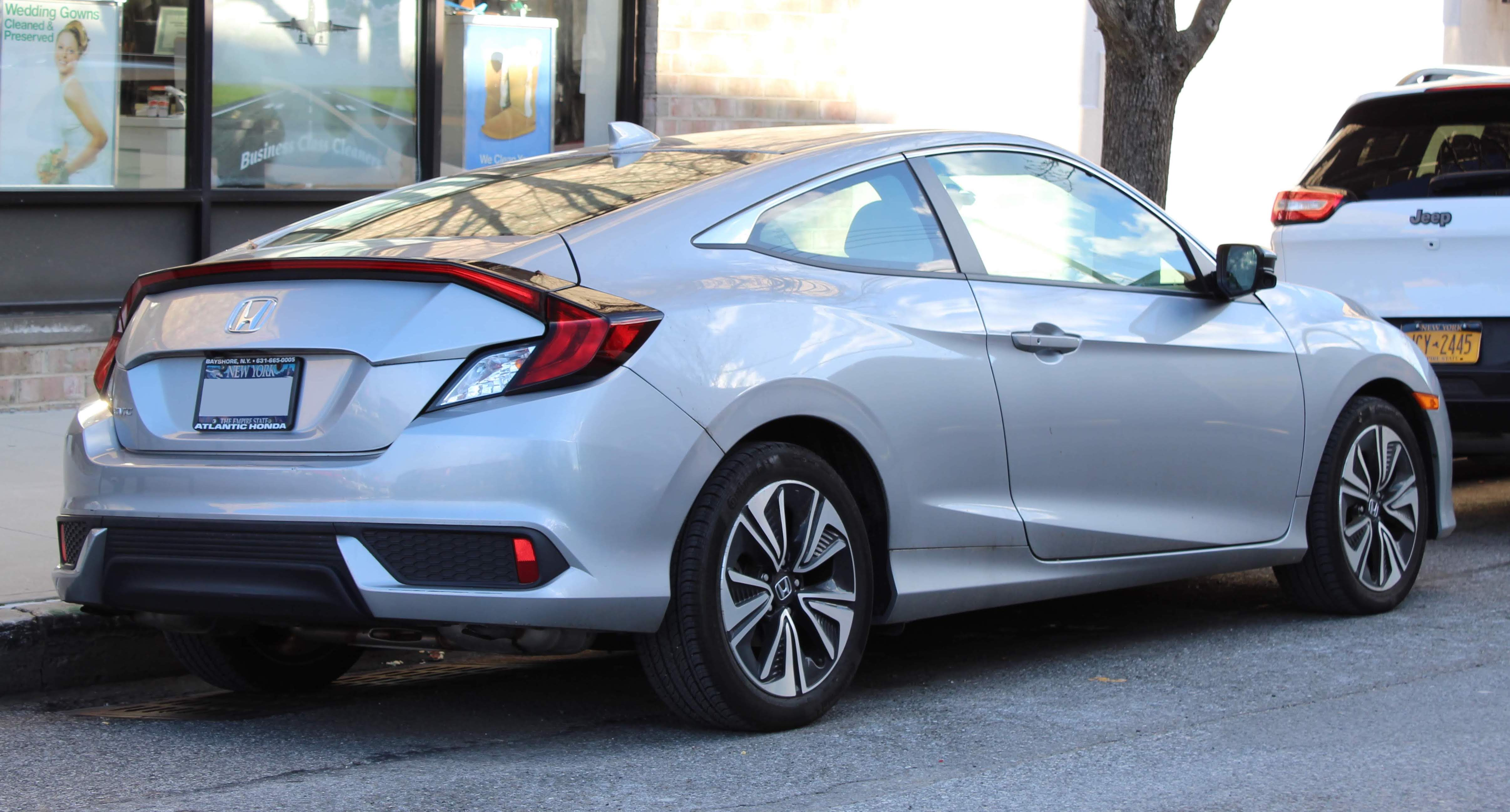
Rear view

== Performance models ==
=== Si ===
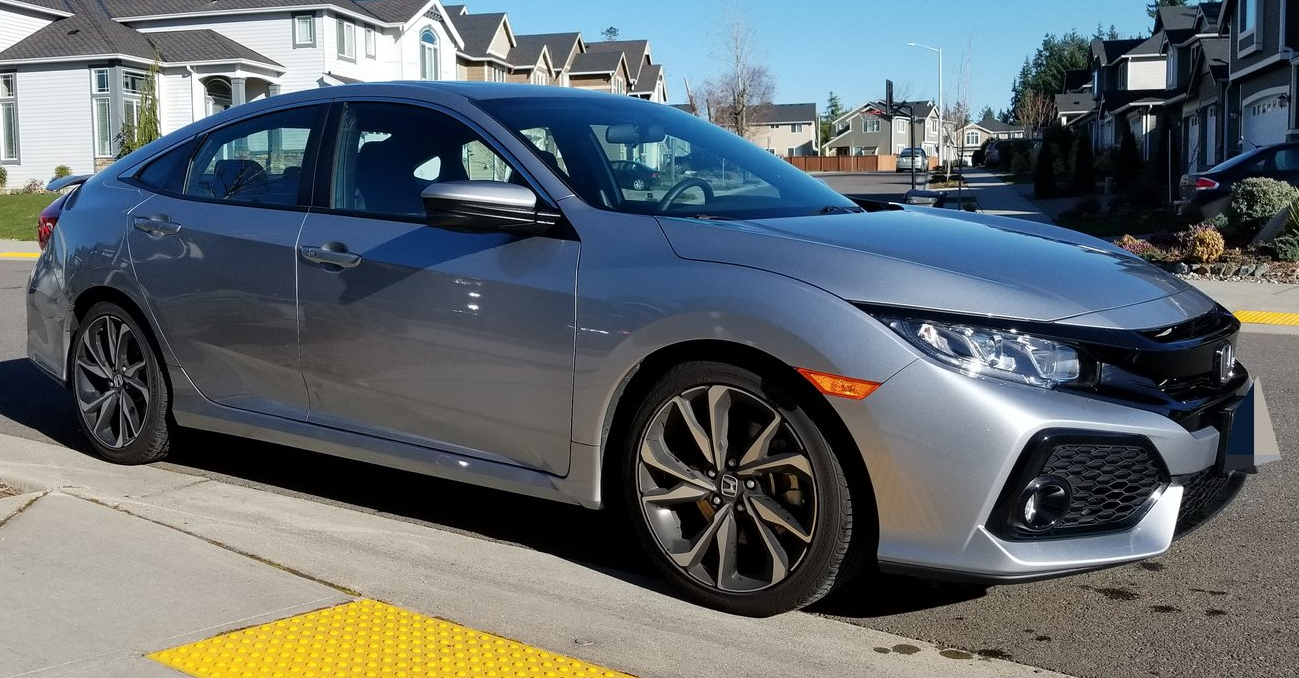
Civic Si sedan

The Civic Si was unveiled in November 2016 as a prototype model at the Los Angeles International Auto Show. It is powered by a turbocharged 1.5-litre engine available exclusively with a 6-speed manual. Performance features include active shock absorbers, active steering and a limited-slip differential. Honda claims the tenth-generation Civic Si trim (which is the eighth-generation of Civic to offer an Si trim level) reaches 60 mph (97 km/h) in 7.0 seconds, though Car and Driver was able to bring a 2017 Civic Si Coupe to 60 mph (97 km/h) in 6.3 seconds.

=== Type R ===
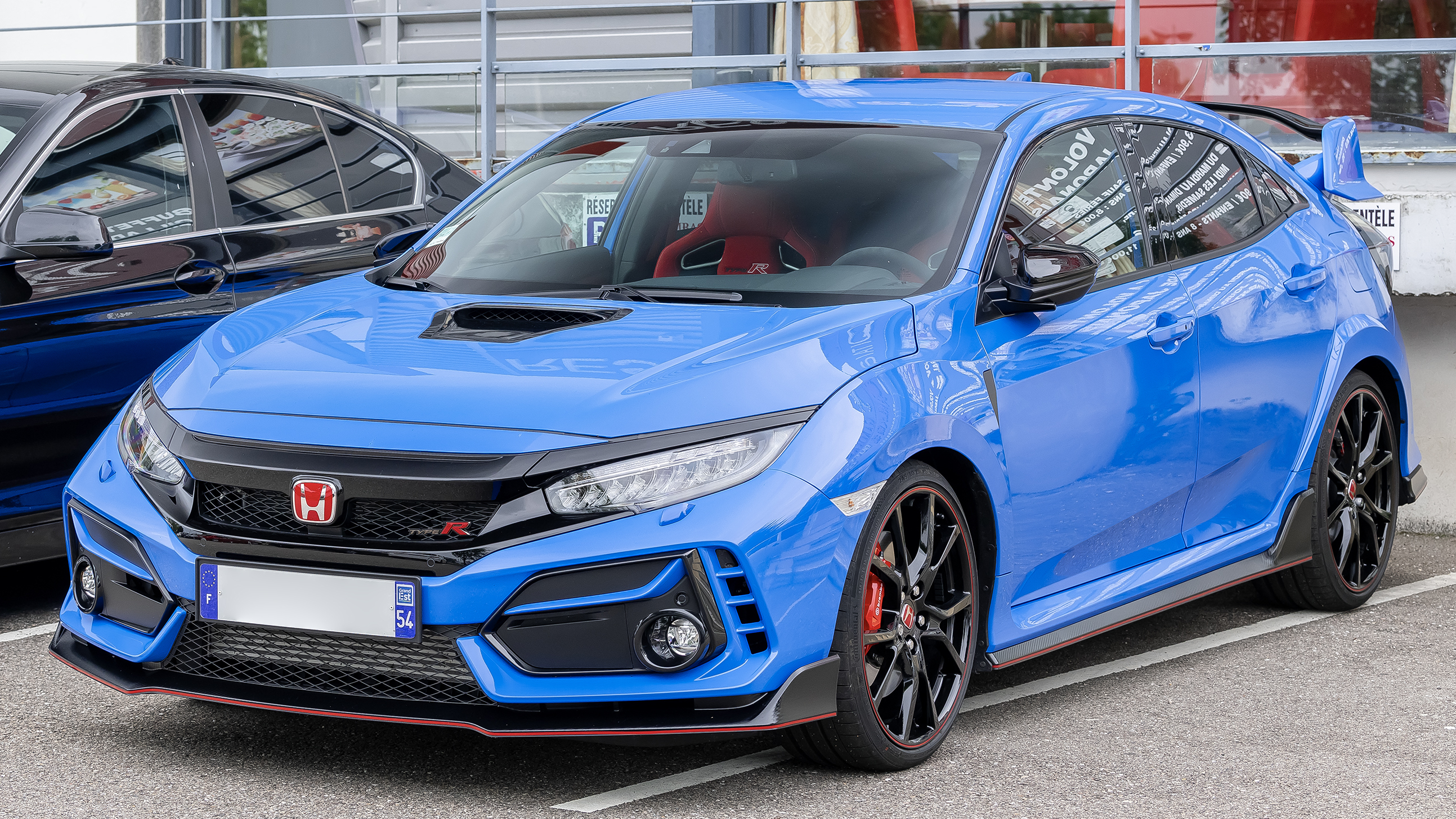
Civic Type R

The Type R was unveiled as a prototype model the 2016 Paris Motor Show, with the production model unveiled the following year. The Type R shared the same overall body as the hatchback but with a more performance-focused appearance, with an added body kits, red 'H' badge, air intake on the hood, an air scoop, 20-inch piano black alloy wheels with red accents, enlarged wheel arches, and three tailpipes. It has a 2.0-litre turbocharged i-VTEC inline-four engine which produces 306 hp (310 PS; 228 kW) and 295 lb⋅ft (400 N⋅m; 40.8 kg⋅m) of torque. Fuel efficiency is rated at a combined consumption of 25 mpg_{‑US} (9.4 L/100 km; 10.6 km/L).

== Facelift ==
The revised model of the Civic sedan and coupe was revealed in August 2018 for the 2019 model year in North America, and available in the US market since October 10, 2018.

In North America, it features Honda Sensing as standard and Sport Trim on Sedan and Coupe variants in the US market. The Sport Trim is equipped with the touchscreen display for the sedan and coupe variants, unlike the Hatchback variant which is equipped with the more basic non-touchscreen infotainment display. The US market Sport trim for the sedan and coupe variants was offered with the 6-speed manual and CVT. Changes at the front features a black housing around the projector headlamps for the non turbo variant, restyled lower air splitter, piano black front grille, chrome/piano black accented fog lamp trim and lower chrome trim/black diffuser trim at the rear bumper. The interior is mostly unchanged except for the inclusion of volume knobs for the 7-inch touchscreen display, with additional physical buttons to adjust the fan speed for the air conditioner next to the climate button.

A new Sport trim was added above the LX trim, adding rectangular centre exhaust, rear decklid spoiler and 18-inch alloy wheels.

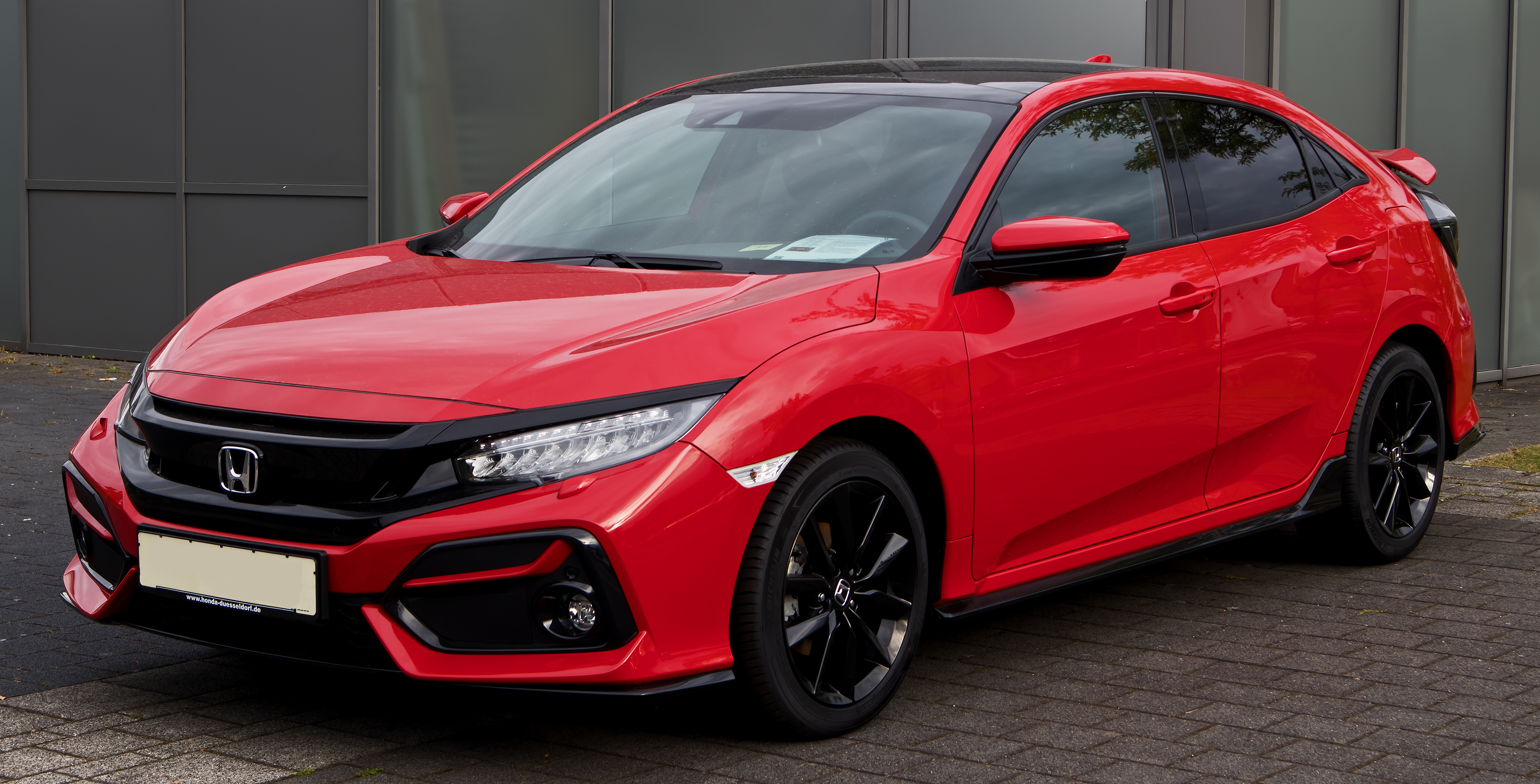
Hatchback (facelift)

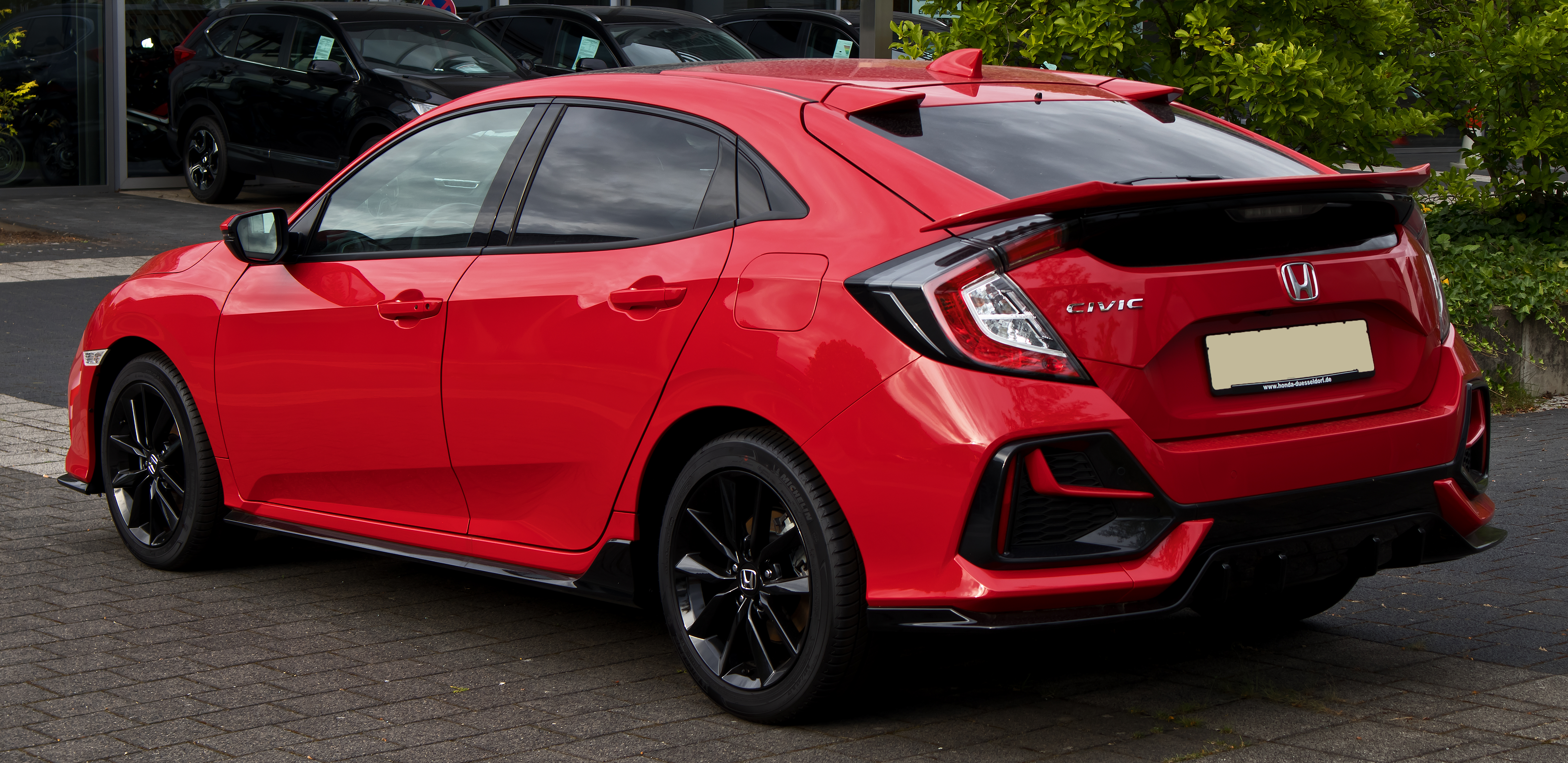
Hatchback (facelift)

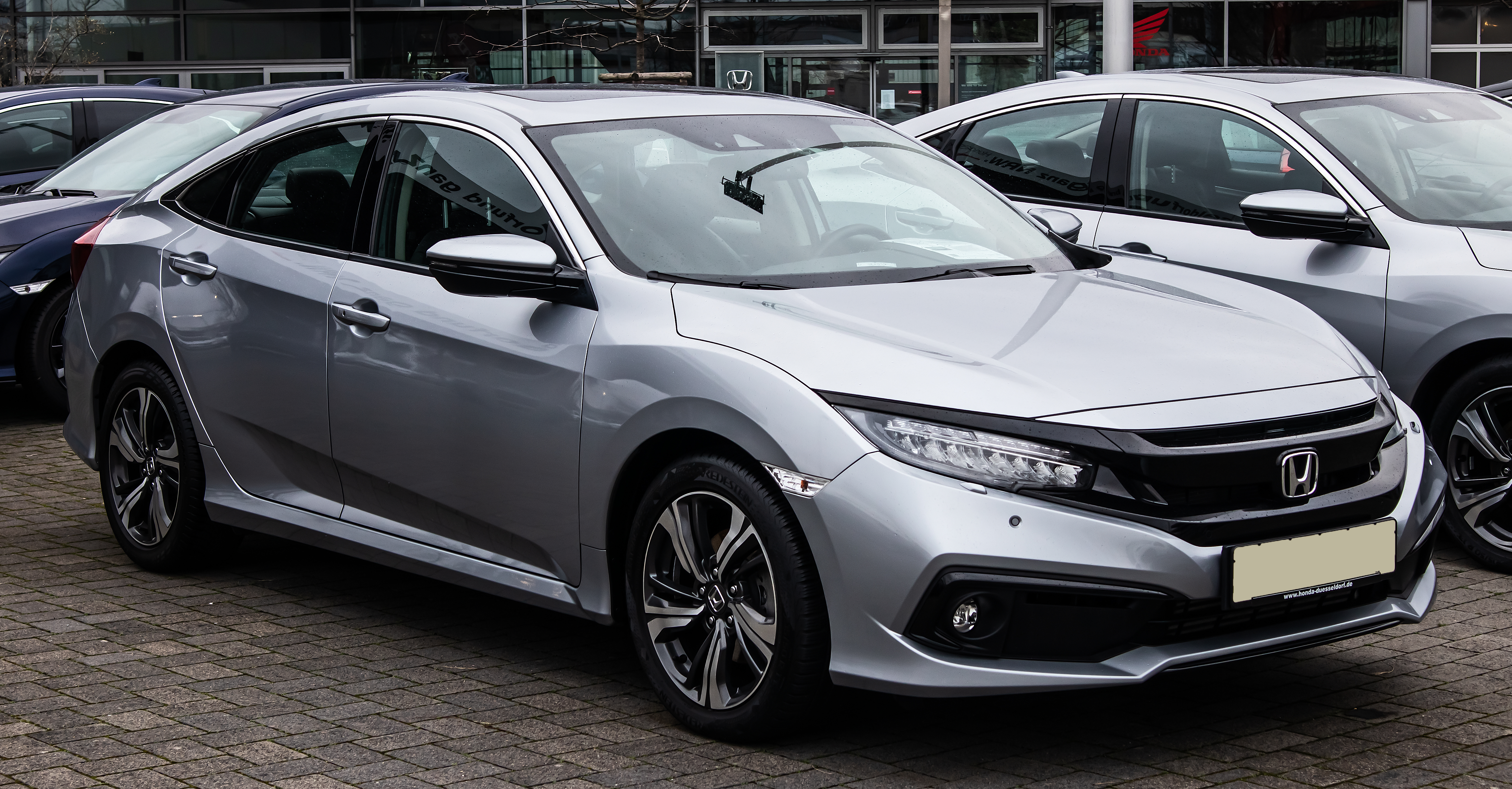
Sedan (facelift)

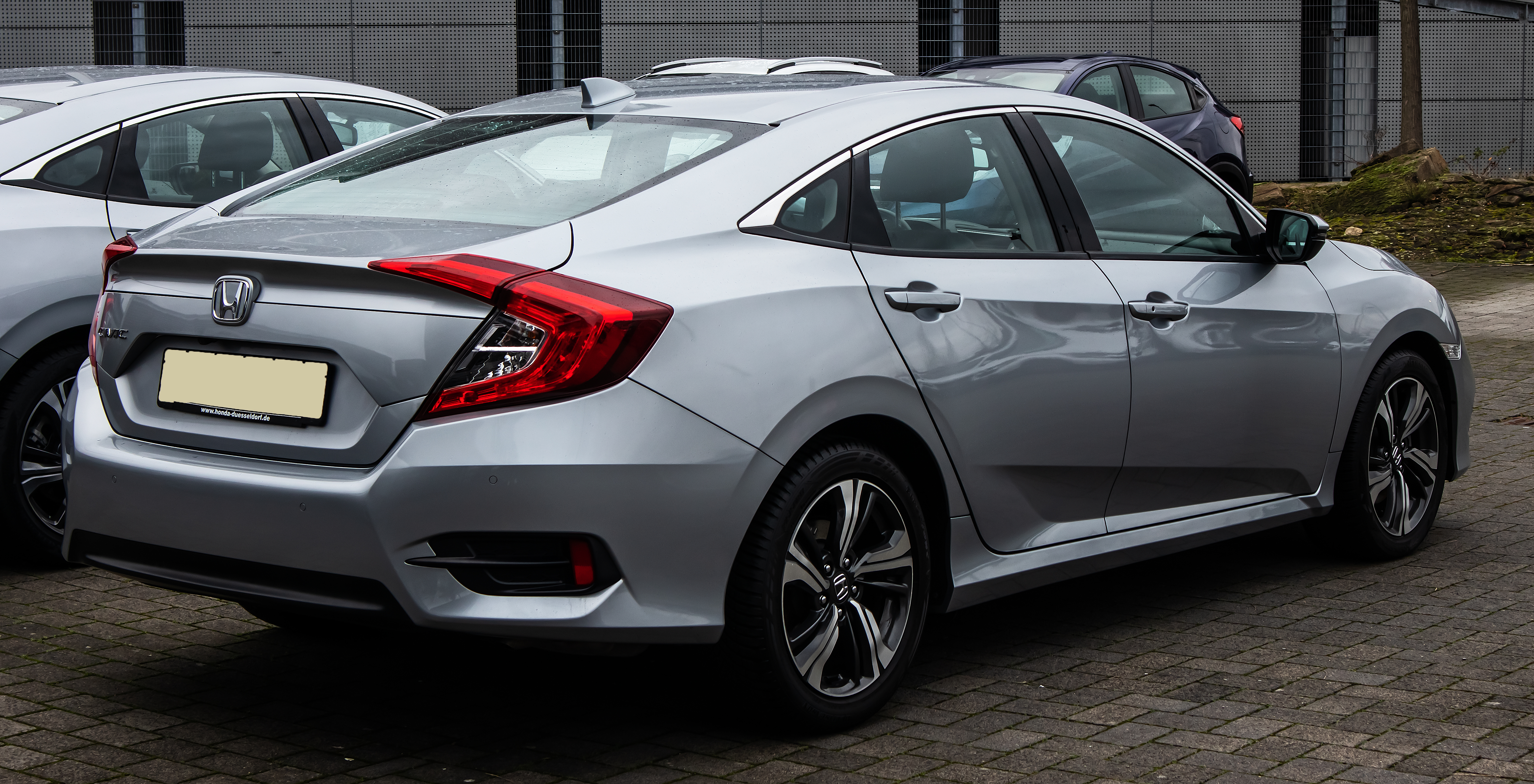
Sedan (facelift)

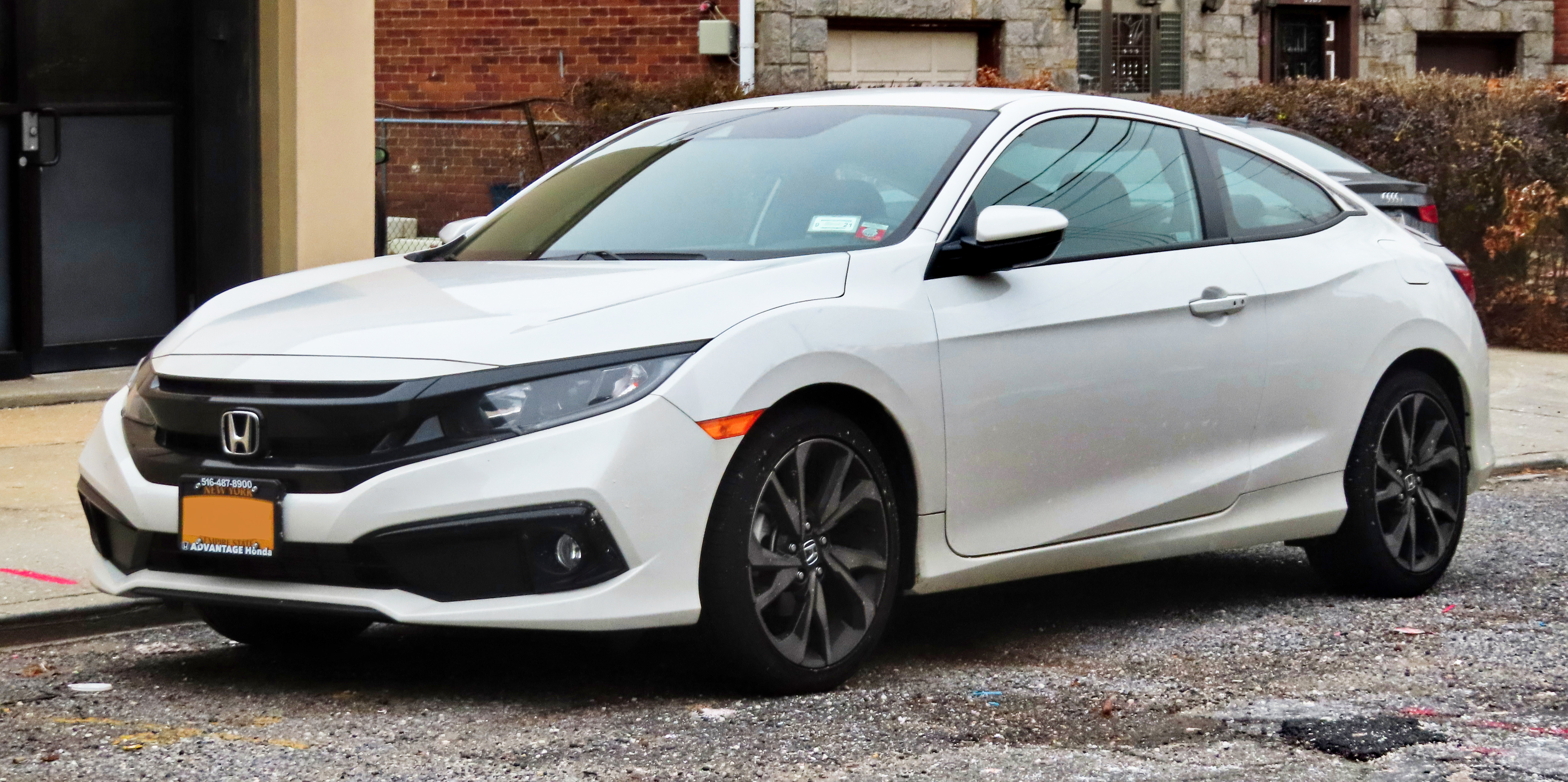
Civic coupe (facelift)

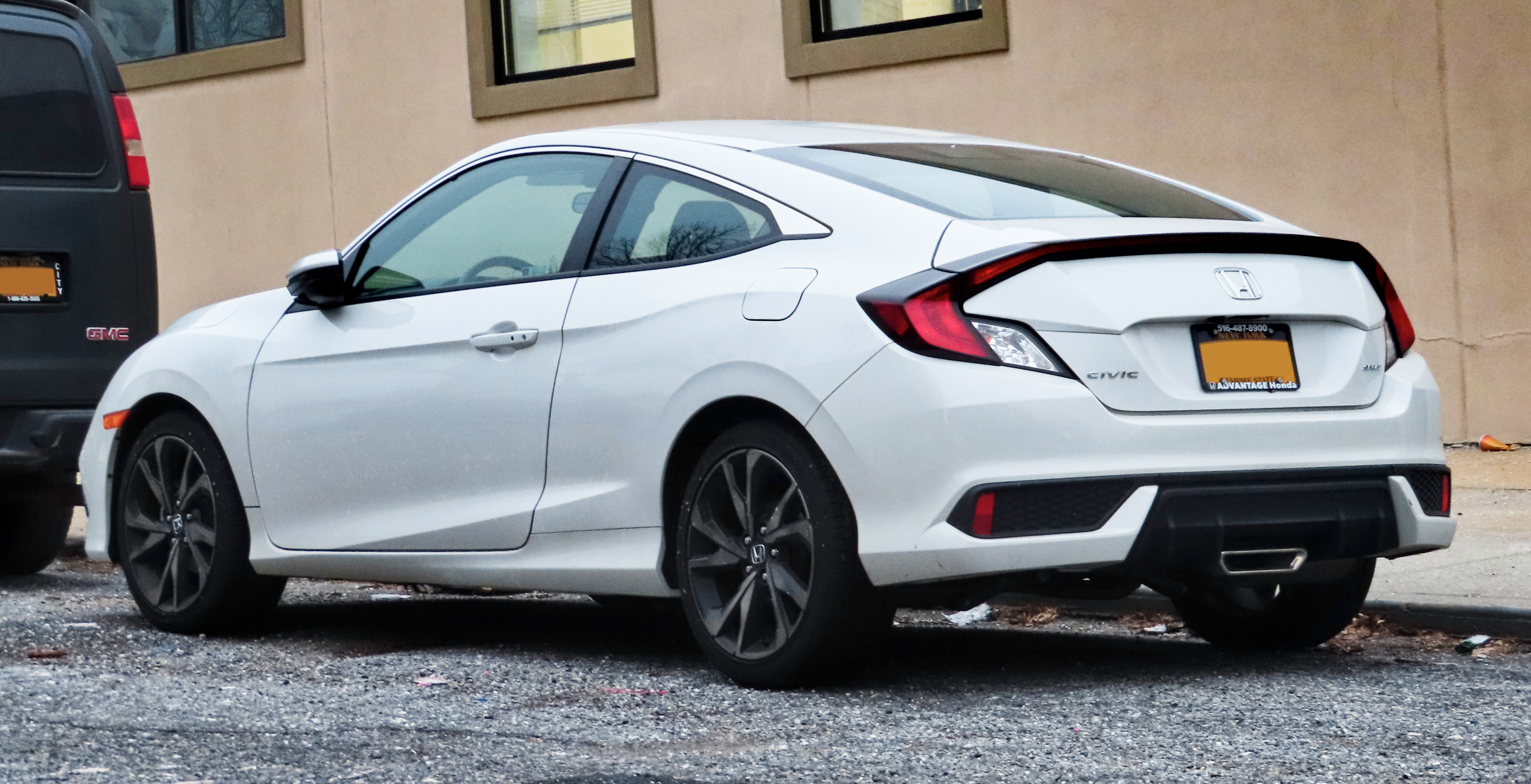
Civic coupe (facelift)

== Powertrain ==
Engine	Chassis code	Horsepower	Torque
1.5 L L15B7 I4 turbo petrol	FC1 (Sedan); FC3 (Coupe); FK4 (Hatchback)	174 hp (130 kW) at 6,000 rpm (Standard); 205 hp (153 kW) at 5,700 rpm (Si Sedan and Si Coupe)	162 lb⋅ft (220 N⋅m) at 1,700-5,500 rpm (Standard); 192 lb⋅ft (260 N⋅m) at 2,100-5,000 rpm (Si Sedan and Si Coupe)
2.0 L K20C2 I4 petrol	FC2 (Sedan); FC4 (Coupe)	158 hp (118 kW) at 6,500 rpm	138 lb⋅ft (187 N⋅m) at 4,200 rpm
1.6 L R16B I4 petrol	FC5 (Sedan)	125 hp (93 kW) at 6,500 rpm	112 lb⋅ft (152 N⋅m) at 4,300 rpm
1.8 L R18Z1 I4 petrol	FC6 (Sedan); FK5 (Hatchback)	140 hp (104 kW) at 6,500 rpm	128 lb⋅ft (174 N⋅m) at 4,300 rpm
1.0 L P10A2 I3 turbo petrol	FC7 (Sedan); FC9 (Sedan); FK6 (Hatchback)	128 hp (95 kW) at 5,500 rpm	147 lb⋅ft (199 N⋅m) at 2,250 rpm
1.6 L N16A1 I4 turbo diesel	FC8 (Sedan); FK9 (Hatchback)	118 hp (88 kW) at 4,000 rpm	221 lb⋅ft (300 N⋅m) at 2,000 rpm
1.5 L L15BA / L15C I4 turbo petrol	FK7 (Hatchback)	180 hp (134 kW) at 5,500 rpm (Manual) 180 hp (134 kW) at 6,000 rpm (CVT)	177 lb⋅ft (240 N⋅m) at 1,900-5,000 rpm (Manual); 162 lb⋅ft (220 N⋅m) at 1,700-5,500 rpm (CVT)
2.0 L K20C1 I4 turbo petrol	FK8 (Type R Hatchback)	315 hp (235 kW) at 6,500 rpm	295 lb⋅ft (400 N⋅m) at 2,500-4,500 rpm

== Markets ==
Production of the sedan began at Honda of Canada Manufacturing on 20 October 2015 and shortly later at Honda Manufacturing of Indiana began on October 27. Civic Hatchbacks were produced at Honda of the UK Manufacturing (HUM) until 28 July 2021 when the last car built at the plant, a Civic sedan for the US market, rolled off the production line. The plant closed on the 30th July 2021.

The 2.0-litre and 1.5-litre turbocharged engines used in North American Civic are manufactured in Anna, Ohio and Alliston, Ontario. The vehicles' automatic transmissions (CVTs) are sourced from Honda plants in Russells Point, Ohio and Celaya, Mexico.

=== North America ===
The tenth-generation sedan was released in November 2015, the coupe in early 2016, and hatchback in 2017. All models have a 2.0-litre naturally-aspirated petrol engine or 1.5-litre turbo petrol engines, except for the hatchback, which only comes with the 1.5-litre direct injected turbo engine. The 2.0-litre engine sedan model paired with the CVT has an EPA-estimated fuel economy of 31/40/34 mpg (city/highway/combined). A 6-speed manual transmission or CVT is offered on all models, except for the Type R and Si models, which only come with the 6-speed manual transmission, and the Touring models, which only come with a CVT.

Higher-end trim levels of the 1.5-litre turbocharged and 2.0-litre naturally-aspirated engines only come with a CVT. The Sport Hatchback is a performance trim level that is available with either a CVT or 6-speed manual transmission. Si is a performance trim level that also only comes with the 6-speed manual, but it has a 1.5-litre turbocharged engine instead of the 2.0-litre turbocharged engine of the Type R, and is only offered as a sedan or coupe, not a hatchback. In 2019, an additional Sport trim for coupe and sedan was introduced between the LX and EX model featuring a gloss black grille and 18-inch wheels but uses the 2.0-litre engine, giving buyers an option on top of the standard EX model. In 2019, for the 2020 model year, Honda expanded the availability of Civic's optional 6-speed manual transmission to include the hatchback's top Sport Touring trim.

The Type R model was also released in 2017 with a hatchback body style, featuring an exclusive 2.0-litre turbocharged i-VTEC 4-cylinder petrol engine.

=== Japan ===
The Civic was revived for the Japanese domestic market in 2017, after a seven-year hiatus that skipped the ninth-generation except for 750 units of the UK-built Type R. The tenth-generation Civic line was revealed in Japan on 27 July 2017 and went on sale on 29 September 2017. It is available in both sedan and hatchback forms, with the former was manufactured locally in Yorii, Saitama, while the latter was imported from the UK. The facelifted version of both sedan and hatchback versions were revealed on 15 November 2019, unveiled on 10 January 2020 at the Tokyo Auto Salon and released on January 23, 2020. The sedan model was discontinued in August 2020 with local production ending due to lower than expected sales, while the hatchback continued to be available up to the introduction of the eleventh-generation Civic.

=== Europe ===
European models went on sale in spring 2017. Early models included a choice of 3 engines (1.0-litre and 1.5-litre turbo, 1.6-litre diesel all with either a 6-speed manual or a CVT on gasoline models, and ZF 9-speed automatic on the diesel engine). It was introduced to the UK market in 2017. It first arrived with the hatchback model, with the saloon model joining the lineup in 2018.

=== Australia ===
After the launch of the current generation Civic sedan in Australia in June 2019, sales of the Honda model shot up almost 50 percent. It has about 23 percent of private market share, matching performance of the best sellers in the segment. Honda does not compete in fleet or rental market. The biggest seller is the RS contributing to over 25 percent of sales, while 60 percent of sales is made up of the turbocharged models in the lineup. The hatchback was launched in May 2017.

=== China ===
The tenth-generation Civic sedan was launched in China on 14 April 2016. The only engines available are the 1.0-litre turbocharged P10A1 and the 1.5-litre turbocharged L15B8 engine paired with 6-speed manual and CVT gearboxes. Trim levels for the Chinese market are known as the 180TURBO CVT, 180TURBO manual, 220TURBO CVT and 220TURBO manual. The hatchback model was introduced in China in 2020 and positioned above the sedan.

=== Egypt ===
The tenth generation Honda Civic was unveiled in Egypt in 2017, and was imported from Turkey. It featured two trims: the Lxi, and the VTi. Both trims had the 1.6L R16B engine. The VTi featured a sunroof, and a fully digital cockpit, while the Lxi had analog dials with an LCD screen in the centre. None of the trims featured Honda Sensing. As of 2023, the Honda Civic is no longer available at any Honda dealership in Egypt.

=== South America ===
Honda manufactured the tenth-generation Civic in Sumaré (Brazil) from 2016 to November 2021. It is the last generation of Civic to be built in Brazil. The Civic was manufactured in Brazil since 1997.

=== Southeast Asia ===
==== Indonesia ====
The tenth-generation Civic sedan was launched on April 7, 2016, at the 24th Indonesia International Motor Show in Jakarta by Honda Prospect Motor. It uses the newer 1.5 L L15B7 I4 i-VTEC engine with a turbocharger. The hatchback was also launched on June 9, 2017, and uses the same engine as the sedan, and is available in S and E trim levels paired with CVT. The sedan received its facelift on February 21, 2019, while the hatchback received its facelift on February 6, 2020. For the facelifted hatchback model, the S and E trims were replaced with the RS trim.

==== Malaysia ====
On June 9, 2016, the Civic was launched in Malaysia with only the sedan body style which was offered with three variants: 1.8 S, 1.5 Turbo and 1.5 Turbo Premium.

The facelifted version of the Civic for the Malaysian market was launched on February 26, 2020. Three same variants retained for the Civic facelift, a base 1.8 S, a mid-spec 1.5 TC and range-topping 1.5 TC-P. Honda Sensing is available on the top spec 1.5 TC-P.

The Honda Civic 1.8 S also has been chosen as the new mobile patrol vehicles (MPV) of the Royal Malaysian Police.

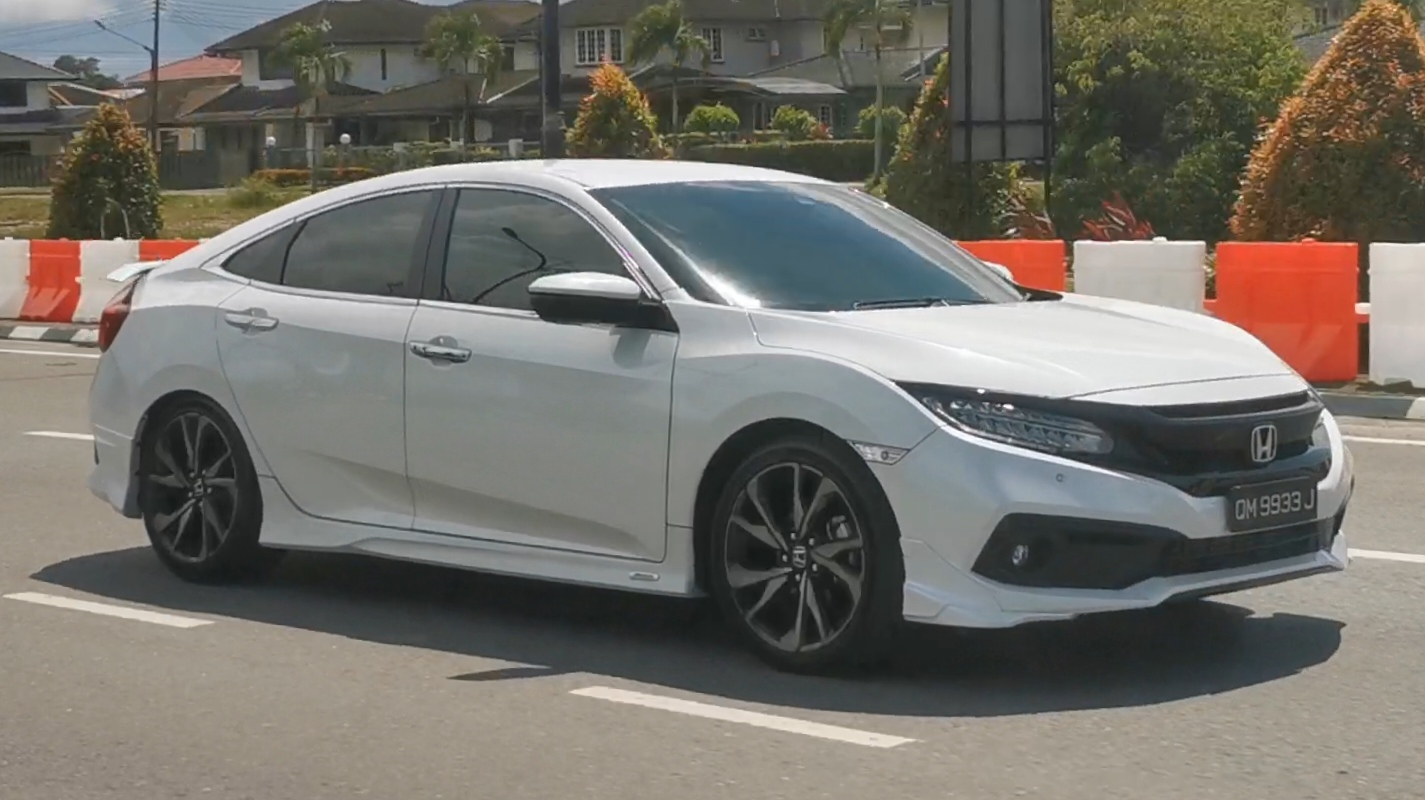
2020 Honda Civic 1.5 TC-P

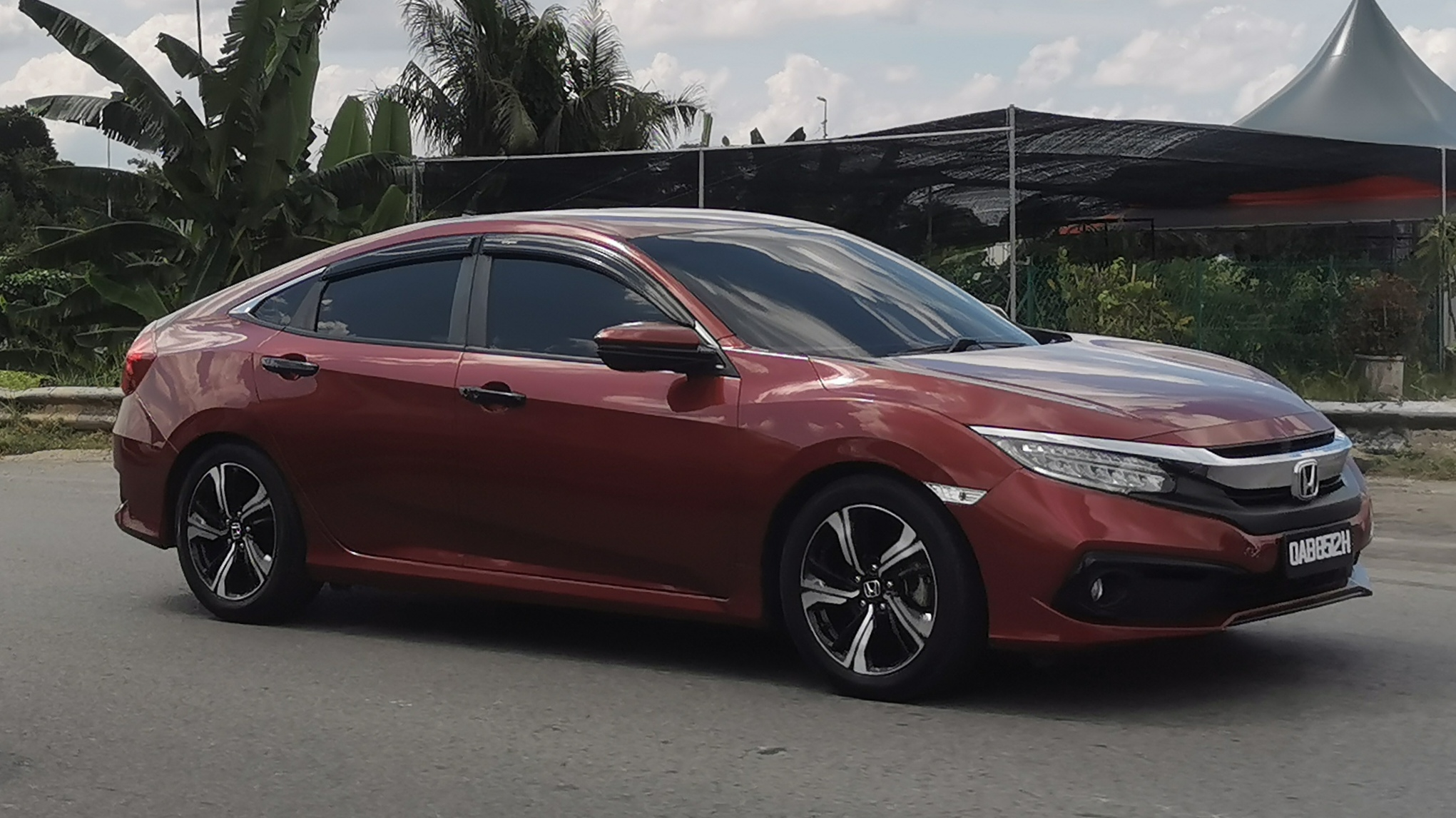
2020 Honda Civic 1.5 TC

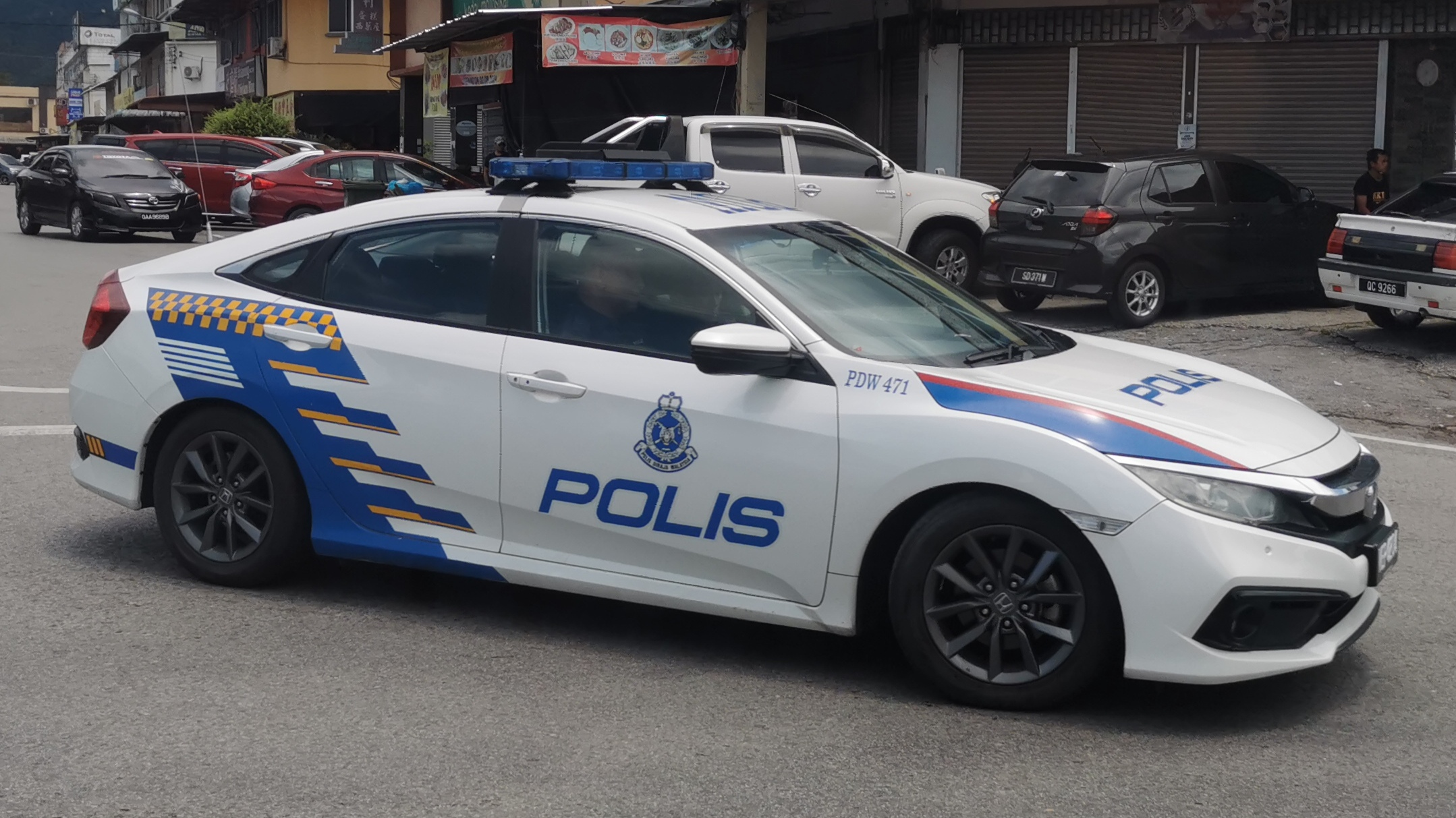
2020 Honda Civic 1.8 S used as (Royal Malaysian Police)

==== Philippines ====
The tenth-generation Civic was launched in the Philippines on April 26, 2016. It is offered in two trim levels, 1.8 E and 1.5 RS Turbo. Two engine choices are offered, the 1.8-litre naturally aspirated with i-VTEC technology carried over from the previous generation model produces 141 hp (105 kW) and 174 N⋅m (128 lb⋅ft) of torque (E trim) and the new 1.5-litre VTEC Turbo produces 173 hp (129 kW) and 220 N⋅m (160 lb⋅ft) of torque, equipped with turbocharger (RS trim). Both engines are mated to Earth Dreams continuously variable transmission (CVT). All Philippine-market Civics are imported from Thailand.

The facelifted version of the Civic was launched in April 2019, and is offered in three trim levels; 1.8 S, 1.8 E and 1.5 RS Turbo. The base 1.8 S features projector halogen headlamps, rearview camera, electronic parking brake and a 7-inch touchscreen audio system. The 1.8 S has the same wheel design as the pre-facelift 1.8 E trim. The 1.8 E adds push button start/stop, power folding side mirrors, full LED headlamps and a new 16-inch alloy wheel design, while the 1.5 RS Turbo received new 18-inch alloy wheels, aluminum sport pedals and a volume knob for the infotainment system.

==== Singapore ====
The Civic sedan was launched by the local dealership with a choice of a 1.6L or 1.5L Turbo in July 2016, and facelifted in January 2019. For a limited period of time, the hatchback form was offered as well; however in limited units from 2017 till mid-2018. In January 2019, the facelift for the Civic was released along with new wheel design and LED foglamps for the 1.6L model, inclusion of additional AC buttons next to the climate buttons and added volume knob for the touchscreen headunit and variants received shark-fin antennas. For a limited time, a sports edition package is available as an upgrade with gloss black grille, added skirting, rear spoiler and 17” aftermarket OZ rims. In April 2020, a new colour Coffee Cherry Red Metallic was available and it replaced Rallye Red colour.

==== Thailand ====
Honda Automobile Thailand debuted the Civic on March 12, 2016. Choices include E, EL, Turbo and Turbo RS, a 1.8-litre naturally aspirated with i-VTEC technology that produces 141 hp (105 kW) and 174 N⋅m (128 lb⋅ft) of torque (E, EL) and the new 1.5-litre VTEC TURBO produces 173 hp (129 kW) and 220 N⋅m (160 lb⋅ft) of torque, achieved with the employment of turbocharger (Turbo, Turbo RS, Hatchback). Both engines are mated to Earth Dreams continuously variable transmission (CVT).

Locally assembled hatchback with 1.5 litre turbo engine and CVT arrives in March 2017.

The facelifted Civic debuted at the Thailand International Motor Expo on November 28, 2018, with Turbo RS variant equipped with Honda Sensing, sporting a piano black front grille and matching piano black fog lamp trim on the exterior and additional buttons to adjust the fan speed for the air conditioner next to the climate button in the interior. The other variants included the shifting of the rear windshield antenna to the car roof with the addition of a shark fin antenna and inclusion of volume knobs for the 7-inch touchscreen display as standard along with the facelifted bumpers and new rim spoke design for the 1.8EL model.

=== India ===
The tenth-generation Civic was launched in the Indian market in March 2019 after facelift. It was locally assembled at Honda India's plant in Greater Noida. It is available with the 1.8-litre i-VTEC petrol paired to the CVT and the 1.6L i-DTEC turbo-diesel paired to the 6-speed manual gearbox. It was discontinued in December 2020 along with the CR-V due to lower sales and following the company's decision to cease manufacturing operations at its Greater Noida plant.

=== Pakistan ===
Honda Atlas launched the tenth generation Civic sedan in Pakistan on July 22, 2016, as a locally assembled model. At the time of launch, three variants were offered: i-VTEC (Standard), i-VTEC Oriel and VTEC Turbo. i-VTEC and i-VTEC Oriel trims came with the 1.8-litre R18Z1 I4 petrol engine producing a total output of 140 hp (104 kW) and 174 N⋅m (128 lb⋅ft) of torque, while the VTEC Turbo trim came with the 1.5-litre L15B7 I4 turbo petrol engine producing a total output of 174 hp (130 kW) and 220 N⋅m (162 lb⋅ft) of torque. All three trim levels came with 7-speed sequential CVT. Because of engine knocking issues due to poor quality fuel in Pakistan, the 1.5-litre turbocharged variant was discontinued for an unknown period of time in March 2017.

Later, when good quality fuel started being imported in Pakistan, Honda Atlas launched the locally assembled facelifted sedan on April 9, 2019. Three trim levels were offered at the time of launch: i-VTEC, i-VTEC Oriel and RS VTEC Turbo. It was the first time that the RS trim was introduced in Pakistan. All three trim levels came with the same engines as those present in their respective pre-facelift models and also the same CVT. Later, Honda Atlas launched another trim (VTEC Turbo Oriel) which used the same 1.5-litre turbocharged engine as the RS trim. It came with a few downgrades in features and cosmetics and a lower price to match.

== Safety ==
NHTSA		IIHS		Euro NCAP		
Overall	5 stars	Small overlap frontal offset	Good	Overall	5 stars	
Frontal Driver	5 stars	Moderate overlap frontal offset	Good	Adult Occupant	35 pts.	92%
Frontal Passenger	5 stars	Side impact	Good	Child Occupant	36.9 pts.	75%
Side Driver	5 stars	Roof strength	Good	Pedestrian	31.7 pts.	75%
Side Passenger	5 stars	Front crash prevention	Good	Safety Assist	10.7 pts.	88%
Side Pole Driver	5 stars	Child Seat Anchors (LATCH) Ease of Use	Acceptable			
Rollover	5 stars	Headlights	Poor			

ANCAP test results* Honda Civic all sedan variants (2017)
Test	Score
Overall	5 /5 stars
Frontal offset	14.75/16
Side impact	14.93/16
Pole	2/2
Seat belt reminders	3/3
Whiplash protection	Good
Pedestrian protection	Good
Electronic stability control	Standard

ANCAP test results* Honda Civic all hatch variants except Type R (2017)
Test	Score
Overall	5 /5 stars
Frontal offset	14.75/16
Side impact	14.93/16
Pole	2/2
Seat belt reminders	3/3
Whiplash protection	Good
Pedestrian protection	Good
Electronic stability control	Standard

ASEAN NCAP test results Honda Civic (2016)
Test	Points	Stars
Adult occupant:	14.74	4 /5 stars
Child occupant:	86%	4 /5 stars
Safety assist:	NA	

ASEAN NCAP test results Honda Civic (2016)
Test	Points	Stars
Adult occupant:	14.74	5 /5 stars
Child occupant:	86%	4 /5 stars
Safety assist:	NA	

== Awards ==
- Car and Driver's 10Best list in 2019.

Preceded by Honda Civic (ninth generation)	Honda Civic (tenth generation); 2015–2021	Succeeded by Honda Civic (eleventh generation)
