= FCC (disambiguation) =

FCC is the Federal Communications Commission, an independent agency of the U.S. federal government.

FCC or fcc may also refer to:

== Religion ==
- Federated Colored Catholics, an African-American Catholic organization
- Franciscan Clarist Congregation, a tertiary religious order
- Free Church of Scotland (disambiguation)

== Education ==
- Faujdarhat Cadet College, Bangladesh
- Federal City College, now merged into the University of the District of Columbia
- Felpham Community College, England
- Florida Christian College, now Johnson University Florida, in Kissimmee, Florida, United States
- Forman Christian College, Lahore, Pakistan
- Frederick Community College, Maryland, United States
- Fresno City College, Fresno, California, United States
- Footscray City College, a high school in Melbourne, Australia
- freeCodeCamp, a nonprofit online course that teaches computer programming

== Science and technology ==
- Face-centered cubic, a crystal system
- FCC Group, formerly known as Fomento de Construcciones y Contratas, S. A., a Spanish business group based in Barcelona
- Female cosmetic coalitions, a theory about the emergence of art, ritual, and symbolic culture
- Fibrocystic change
- Flash column chromatography
- Fluid catalytic cracking
- Food Chemicals Codex
- Future Circular Collider, a proposed particle collider
- FCC, a hypothetical 3-in-one vaccine for the flu, common cold, and COVID-19
- United States Army Futures and Concepts Command, a command that sets requirements, develops technology, and performs experiments for the United States Army

== Sport ==
- Chilean Cycling Federation (Spanish: Federación Ciclista de Chile)
- Colombian Cycling Federation (Spanish: Federación Colombiana de Ciclismo)
- Cuban Cycling Federation (Spanish: Federación Cubana de Ciclismo)
- FC Carl Zeiss Jena, a German association football club
- FC Chartres, a French association football club
- FC Cincinnati, an American soccer club
- FIFA Confederations Cup, an international association football tournament for men's national teams
- Four Continents Championships, a figure skating competition

== Transport ==
- Ferrocarril Central, a former Peruvian railway company
- Ferrocarriles de Cuba, the National Railways of Cuba
- First Capital Connect, a defunct United Kingdom train operator
- Florence and Cripple Creek Railroad, a defunct Colorado narrow-gauge railway

== Other uses ==
- Fairfield Community Connection, an American bulletin board system
- Farm Credit Canada, formerly Farm Credit Corporation, a Canadian crown corporation
- Flying Cunts of Chaos, an American rock band and former backing band of Serj Tankian
- FCC Environment, a British waste management firm
- "FCC Song", by Eric Idle
- Federal Correctional Complex; see List of U.S. federal prisons
- Five Country Conference, a conference of the immigration authorities for English speaking countries
- Fomento de Construcciones y Contratas, a Spanish construction firm
- Foreign Correspondents' Club, a group of clubs for foreign correspondents and journalists
- Civil Forum for Change (Forum civil pour le changement; FCC), an alliance of civil society groups created in Algeria in 2019
- The Future Cities Catapult, which became the Connected Places Catapult in April 2019

== See also ==
- FC (disambiguation)
- FCCC (disambiguation)
