= Honda Türkiye =

Honda Türkiye A.Ş.
- Type: Subsidiary of Honda
- Industry: Automotive
- Founded: 1992
- Defunct: 2021
- Headquarters: Çayırova, Kocaeli, Turkey
- Products: Automobiles

Honda Türkiye A.Ş. is a former car manufacturer based in Kocaeli Province, Turkey and a subsidiary of Honda.

== History ==
Since 1986, Honda vehicles have been distributed by Çelik Motor (a company of the Anadolu Group) in Turkey.

In 1992, joint venture "Anadolu Honda Otomobilcilik A.Ş." was founded, in which the Anadolu Group and Honda each held 50%. In 1996, the foundation was laid for a factory of its own, in which production began in late 1997 and early 1998. In 2002, Honda took over full control of company from the Anadolu Group. In the same year, the motorcycle production in Turkey was finished.

Between 2002 and 2006, annual production increased from around 5,400 to more than 18,000 vehicles. Honda announced that it will close its factory in Şekerpınar, Gebze which started production at the end of 1997, in a global decision in September 2021.

== Models ==
The first model produced in 1998 was the Civic. Production covers most of the EU market. In December 2005, production of the City started, but in 2016 it was discontinued.
