= Faculty Council of Community Colleges =

The Faculty Council of Community Colleges (FCCC) is the official agency through which State University of New York community college faculty engage in university governance.

== History ==
The first meeting of the FCCC was held on May 12, 1967 in Albany. Developed in parallel to the SUNY Faculty Senate, the FCCC originally represented faculty at all New York community colleges. When the City University of New York (CUNY) and SUNY were legislatively separated in 1975, the FCCC no longer included the CUNY Community Colleges in its membership. Today, the FCCC represents faculty at SUNY's 30 community colleges.

== Aims ==
The FCCC focuses on matters relating to community college faculty and system-wide educational policies and other professional matters of the State University of New York, and in those areas the FCCC:

1. Studies, advises, and makes recommendations regarding academic concerns, issues, policies and programs;
2. Provides opportunity and structure for the faculties of the community colleges to formulate positions on policy matters of common interest to the community colleges for transmittal to community college presidents, trustees and sponsors;
3. Provides an opportunity for the faculties of the community colleges to act in an advisory, consultative and planning capacity to the Chancellor of the University;
4. Provides a forum for the consideration of matters of common interest to the faculties of the community colleges;
5. Provides a means for the interchange of ideas among the faculties of the community colleges and between the faculties and the administration of the University; and
6. Provides an additional channel of communication between the university administration and local governing boards of the community colleges.

In addition, the Faculty Council of Community Colleges works with the University Faculty Senate (UFS) on matters of common concern in the conduct of university affairs.

== Membership ==
The voting members of the FCCC include one faculty delegate from each of the 30 community colleges, the Vice Chancellor for Community Colleges, the Associate Provost for Community colleges, the President and the immediate Past President of the FCCC. An alternate delegate is designated by each college to attend the meetings when the delegate cannot.

== Meetings ==
FCCC plenary meetings are held twice a year, once in the fall semester and once in the spring semester. Community college delegates, and their colleges, volunteer to host the meetings.
