= Fundação Cacique Cobra Coral =

Brazilian esoteric organization

- Abbreviation: FCCC
- Formation: 1931; 95 years ago
- Founder: Ângelo Scritori
- Type: Esoteric organization
- Headquarters: Guarulhos, São Paulo, Brazil
- President: Adelaide Scritori
- Website: fccc.org.br

The Fundação Cacique Cobra Coral (FCCC; in English, Cacique Cobra Coral Foundation) is a Brazilian esoteric organization based in Guarulhos, in the state of São Paulo. The foundation says that it was established in 1931 by the medium Ângelo Scritori and that its purpose is to intervene in natural phenomena in order to "minimize catastrophes" associated with human-caused imbalances in nature.

The organization is principally known for claims that the medium Adelaide Scritori can communicate with a spirit called Cacique Cobra Coral and, through it, influence weather conditions. The foundation and its representatives have been associated with municipal and other public bodies in Brazil, as well as with organizers of major public events, including Rock in Rio.

Writer Paulo Coelho served as a vice-president of the foundation between 2004 and 2006. The foundation's website identifies Adelaide Scritori as its president.

== Beliefs and claimed activities ==
According to the foundation, Adelaide Scritori began communicating as a child with an entity known as Cacique Cobra Coral. The organization says that the spirit had previously been incarnated as Galileo Galilei and Abraham Lincoln. Scritori's father, Ângelo Scritori, who was himself a medium, founded the organization and died in 2002 at the age of 104.

El País has described Cacique Cobra Coral as a spirit associated with Umbanda, an Afro-Brazilian religious tradition, and reported that Scritori's husband, Osmar Santos, has acted as a spokesperson and intermediary between the foundation and governments or private companies seeking its services. Anthropologist Renzo Taddei of the Federal University of São Paulo, who has studied relationships between meteorology, religion and traditional beliefs in Brazil, has placed the figure of Cacique Cobra Coral within a broader Brazilian tradition of interaction with spiritual entities associated with natural phenomena.

The organization refers to its attempts to influence weather as "climate operations". According to Santos, meteorological information is provided to Scritori before such an operation. The foundation has at various times worked with people having backgrounds in meteorology or atmospheric science.

The foundation's supernatural explanations for changes in weather are claims made by the organization and its adherents; reports of favourable weather following an intervention do not establish that the foundation caused the meteorological conditions.

== History ==
The foundation traces its origins to 1931. Its official account states that, around the time of Adelaide Scritori's birth in northern Paraná, her father claimed to receive a message from the spirit of Padre Cícero predicting that his daughter would later communicate with another spirit capable of influencing natural phenomena. According to this account, Adelaide first began receiving messages attributed to Cacique Cobra Coral at the age of seven.

During the early 1980s, Adelaide Scritori and Osmar Santos began contacting politicians and public figures in Brazil and abroad, offering what they described as assistance with weather and natural disasters. Santos also promoted accounts of the foundation's activities to Brazilian and international news organizations.

In 1985, the foundation entered into an agreement in Santa Catarina, a state that had experienced recurrent flooding. A contemporaneous notice published in the state's official gazette described the FCCC as an organization based in Guarulhos providing assistance and advice to affiliated public or private entities.

In the late 1980s, the Brazilian Meteorological Society challenged the foundation over what it considered the illegal practice of meteorology. The proceedings were eventually dismissed. Scritori and Santos subsequently established a meteorological agency called La Niña, which was registered with the appropriate professional council and could formally enter into meteorological service agreements.

Paulo Coelho became a vice-president of the organization in the 2000s and helped increase its international public profile. He left the position in 2006.

== Relationships with public authorities and events ==
=== Rio de Janeiro ===
The foundation has had a particularly visible relationship with public authorities in Rio de Janeiro. Former mayor César Maia began working with the organization during his terms in office in the 2000s and publicly credited it with helping to prevent severe weather from disrupting events in the city.

The city and the foundation entered into an agreement during Maia's administration. The relationship continued under his successor, Eduardo Paes. In December 2009, Scritori was asked to participate in efforts intended to prevent rain from disrupting New Year's Eve celebrations at Copacabana.

The foundation has also been associated with attempts to secure favourable weather for Carnival and other large events. Its relationship with event organizers has included Rock in Rio, whose founder Roberto Medina has been reported as having worked with the organization.

Representatives of the foundation say that its agreements with public bodies do not involve payments of public money. Santos has said that, instead, governments are expected to provide information on flood prevention, water-resource recovery, reforestation and other environmental work.

=== São Paulo ===
The municipal government of São Paulo has also had an agreement with the foundation. During the administration of mayor Gilberto Kassab, the FCCC was consulted around public events, including the 2007 visit of Pope Benedict XVI to the city.

According to Veja São Paulo, the foundation claimed that Scritori had intervened to alter atmospheric conditions so that rain would not disrupt the papal visit. The publication reported the claim as a supernatural explanation offered by Scritori rather than as an established meteorological cause.

=== Federal District and federal government ===
In 2017, the government of Brazil's Federal District entered into an arrangement with the foundation during a severe water shortage in Brasília. The foundation said that its role included attempting to bring rain and alleviate low reservoir levels.

In 2021, representatives of the foundation participated in a meeting with officials connected to the Ministry of Mines and Energy during a national hydrological crisis affecting hydroelectric reservoirs. Reporting about the meeting led to conflicting accounts concerning who had initiated the contact and the extent of the ministry's relationship with the foundation.

== International activities ==
The foundation has repeatedly publicized offers or claimed interventions outside Brazil.

In 1987, it offered assistance to British prime minister Margaret Thatcher during a period of cold weather in the United Kingdom. Thatcher did not respond to the offer. The foundation nevertheless later claimed that an increase in temperatures had resulted from its intervention.

Scritori travelled to the United Kingdom in connection with the 2011 wedding of Prince William and Catherine Middleton. Brazilian media reported that she had been hired by a private party with the stated purpose of keeping rain away from the event.

In 2018, Scritori was again in Britain around the wedding of Prince Harry and Meghan Markle. O Globo reported that she had travelled to Windsor after being hired by a British billionaire, rather than by the British royal family itself.

In May 2023, representatives of the foundation travelled to London during preparations for the coronation of Charles III and Camilla. Brazilian news coverage described the trip as an effort by the foundation to prevent rain during the ceremony; the reports did not establish that the foundation had been formally retained by the royal household.

== 2025 suspension of claimed assistance to the United States ==
In July 2025, after U.S. president Donald Trump announced a 50% tariff on imports from Brazil, the foundation announced that it would suspend what it described as 50% of its "climate assistance" to the United States. The organization said that its claimed activities in the country had included areas such as California, New York, Chicago, Florida and the American Midwest since the administration of Ronald Reagan.

The announcement was a statement of the foundation's claimed supernatural activity and did not provide evidence that the organization had previously influenced weather in the United States.

== Reception and criticism ==
The foundation has attracted attention because of the combination of supernatural claims, meteorological terminology and agreements with public institutions. In the late 1980s, the Brazilian Meteorological Society brought proceedings over the alleged unlicensed practice of meteorology. The matter was ultimately dismissed, and Scritori and Santos later established the registered meteorological agency La Niña.

Coverage of the foundation has varied between treatment as a feature of Brazilian popular spirituality and criticism of its relationship with government. Anthropologist Renzo Taddei has argued that the organization should be understood in the context of Brazilian religious and cultural traditions in which distinctions between scientific, spiritual and Indigenous systems of knowledge have historically been less rigid than in some European traditions.

The foundation's claims of direct supernatural control over atmospheric phenomena have not been demonstrated by the coincidence of favourable weather with its interventions; mainstream meteorology explains weather through measurable atmospheric processes and does not recognize mediumistic intervention as a mechanism of weather modification.

== See also ==
- Umbanda
- Mediumship
- Weather modification
- Rainmaking (ritual)
