= Free Church of Scotland =

In contemporary usage, the Free Church of Scotland usually refers to:

- Free Church of Scotland (since 1900), that portion of the original Free Church which remained outside the 1900 merger; extant

It may also refer to:

- Free Church of Scotland (1843–1900), seceded in 1843 from the Church of Scotland. The majority merged in 1900 into the United Free Church of Scotland; historical
- Free Church of Scotland (Continuing), seceded in 2000 from the post-1900 Free Church; extant
