= FC2 =

FC2 can refer to:

- FC2 (portal), a popular Japanese Internet content portal
- FC2: an EEG electrode site according to the 10–20 system
- The nitrile version of the female condom, introduced in 2005
- Fire Controlman Second Class, a rating in the United States Navy
- Fiction Collective Two, an American author-run, not-for-profit publisher of avant-garde, experimental fiction, with the website fc2.org
- Far Cry 2, a video game by Ubisoft
