= France–Singapore relations =

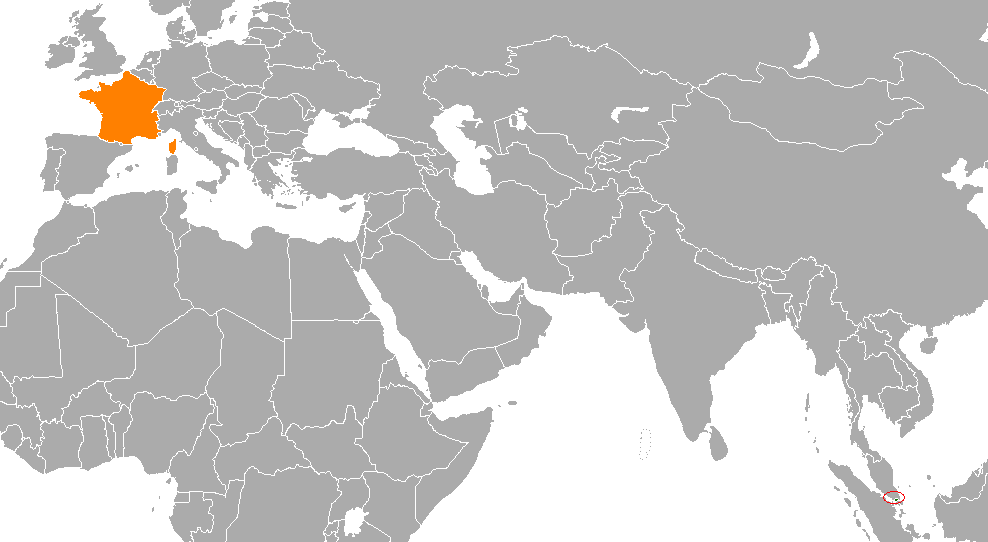
- Singapore: France

France–Singapore relations refers to the bilateral relations between the French Republic and the Republic of Singapore.

== Bilateral relations ==
France and Singapore enjoy good bilateral relations, spanning most fields, including political, education, economic, cultural and defence. France was one of the first 13 countries which recognised the independence of Singapore in 1965. Former Chief Minister of Singapore David Marshall became the first Singapore Ambassador to France. Singapore and France upgraded relations to a Strategic Partnership in 2012 and, following the United Kingdom’s exit from the European Union, France became the only member state of the European Union which was a Strategic Partner of Singapore.

=== Political relations ===
French-Singaporean relations are excellent and dense in numerous fields. They are first of all maintained by a political dialogue at the highest level.

==== Early 2000s ====
On 6 October 2004, then-French President Jacques Chirac made a working visit to Singapore, prior to the ASEAN Summit in Hanoi and his official visit to China. On this visit, Chirac met then-Singapore Prime Minister Lee Hsien Loong, Senior Minister Goh Chok Tong and the late Minister Mentor Lee Kuan Yew. Lee Hsien Loong, who had previously visited France in January 2003 as Deputy Prime Minister, returned there on 28 and 29 November 2005 as Prime Minister and was received by both Chirac and then-French Prime Minister Dominique de Villepin.

In March 2007, then-President of the French Senate Christian Poncelet made an official visit to Singapore as the head of a delegation comprising three senators. They met with then-Singapore President S. R. Nathan, then-Prime Minister Lee Hsien Loong, and then-Parliament Speaker Abdullah Tarmugi. On 27 June 2007, while on a private visit in Paris, then-Singapore Minister Mentor Lee Kuan Yew met with at the time newly elected French President Nicolas Sarkozy at the Elysee Palace, the first meeting between them both.

In 2008, bilateral political relations between the two countries entered a new phase with the official visit that then-Singapore Prime Minister Lee Hsien Loong made to France from 21 to 23 January 2008. It was Lee's second visit to France as Prime Minister and the first time that he met with then-French President Nicolas Sarkozy.

==== Recent years ====
The high-level exchanges have continued into recent years. In April 2024, then-Deputy Prime Minister Lawrence Wong visited France, during which he was hosted to dinner by French President Emmanuel Macron and had a separate meeting with then-French Minister for Economy, Finance, and Digital and Industrial Sovereignty Bruno Le Maire. During Wong’s meeting with Macron, the two launched the Singapore-France Joint Year of Sustainability and agreed to upgrade bilateral relations to a Comprehensive Strategic Partnership in 2025, on the occasion of the 60th anniversary of bilateral relations. Wong became Prime Minister of Singapore a month later. President Tharman Shanmugaratnam made a working visit to France in July 2024, during which he had a brief interaction with Macron during a 2024 Summer Olympic Games pre-Opening Ceremony reception at the Elysee Palace hosted by Macron and Brigitte Macron on 26 July 2024. In August 2024, he made a working visit to France ahead of the 2024 Summer Paralympic Games.

There has been a steady flow of Ministerial visits between the two countries as well. Several Singaporean ministers have mounted visits to France in recent years, including Minister for Health Ong Ye Kung (January 2024), Second Minister for Trade and Industry Tan See Leng (February 2024), Senior Minister and Coordinating Minister for National Security Teo Chee Hean (February and September 2024), Minister for Sustainability and the Environment Grace Fu (May and July 2024), Senior Parliamentary Secretary for Culture, Community and Youth Eric Chua (July 2024), Minister for Culture, Community and Youth Edwin Tong (July 2024), Second Minister for Education Maliki Osman (September 2024), and Minister for Digital Development and Information Josephine Teo (November 2024 and February 2025). Several French ministers have mounted visits to Singapore in recent years, including then-Minister of Justice Eric Dupond-Moretti (February 2024), then-Minister of the Interior Gerald Darmanin (April 2024) and Minister of the Armed Forces Sebastien Lecornu (June 2024).

=== Economic relations ===
France is Singapore’s second-largest trading partner in the EU, while Singapore is France’s top trading partner in ASEAN. Total bilateral trade in goods and services exceeded $30 billion in 2023. Singapore is France's third-leading trading partner in Asia and the leading trading partner in the Southeast Asian region. France is Singapore’s 16th-largest investor and accounted for an overall foreign direct investment stock estimated at S$38.6 billion at end-2022. Singapore is an important regional platform for French companies, in particular in the areas of electronics, finance and chemistry. Singapore is the second destination of French investments in Asia, after Japan. The city-state plays host to 2,600 French companies and their subsidiaries (mainly in the aerospace, electronics, finance and computer goods industries) and about 40 companies that have been founded locally. In 2003, 25 of these companies were included among the 1,000 leading companies in Singapore. STMicroelectronics is Singapore's biggest private employer. Temasek inaugurated its new office in Paris on 10 April 2024.

=== Education ===
The National University of Singapore initiated an exchange programme for students to gain more knowledge of French culture and language. The National Centre of Science Research (CNRS) was involved in the setting up of a joint laboratory between Thales and Nanyang Technological University.

The Lycée Français de Singapour (LFS), a private school established in 1999 under Singapore law and recognised by the French Ministry of National Education, provides education to French nationals living in Singapore as well as to French speaking or English speaking expatriate children who wish to follow the French curriculum. It also welcomes Singaporean children as early as nursery school/kindergarten. The LFS now counts more than 1090 students who benefit from its very functional infrastructure and up-to-date equipment.

As Singapore is striving to become an educational and economic hub in South-east Asia and is viewed as a gateway into the region, the French Business School ESSEC established its Asian campus here, halfway between the two Asian giants India and China. The ESSEC Asian Centre Campus in Singapore was officially opened on 13 May 2006.

The Alliance Française is the leading French language school in Singapore. It also houses a French cultural centre with a well-equipped library with French books.

=== Defence ===
Defence cooperation holds a key position in the bilateral relations between France and Singapore, and these ties are old and strong. They feature three components, a military cooperation, overseen by an agreement signed in Paris in October 1998, which in particular has allowed for a squadron from the Republic of Singapore Air Force to be stationed in France since 1999; an annual strategic dialogue, started in 1999 and led by the ministries of defence, with one session each year involving the army, navy and air force groups; a partnership for the acquisition of weapons. France is the second-leading supplier of weapons to Singapore, which acquired six stealth frigates in 2000, and its third partner in research and development in defence technology. Exchanges of visits by high-level military leaders between the two countries have been taking place frequently since 1997.

In the field of armament, the cooperation is based on an active and permanent dialogue on researches and studies. Through the Delta programme, the Republic of Singapore Navy has acquired six stealth frigates the first of which was built in France and commissioned on 5 May 2007 while the 5 others are being built at the Singaporean shipyard STM. The Delta programme is a key element in the Franco-Singapore defence cooperation because it involves the transfer of know-how and of technology that gives Singapore a role of partner and not simply that of a client.

=== French Chamber of Commerce ===
Established in 1979, and belonging to a worldwide network of 114 French Chambers (UCCIFE) in 78 countries with over 25,000 companies, the French Chamber of Commerce in Singapore (FCCS) is one of the leading chambers in South East Asia. The FCCS' mission is to develop relations between FCCS members and the Singaporean business community, and to encourage economic, commercial and investment relations between France and Singapore.

== Resident diplomatic missions ==
- France has an embassy in Singapore.
- Singapore has an embassy in Paris.
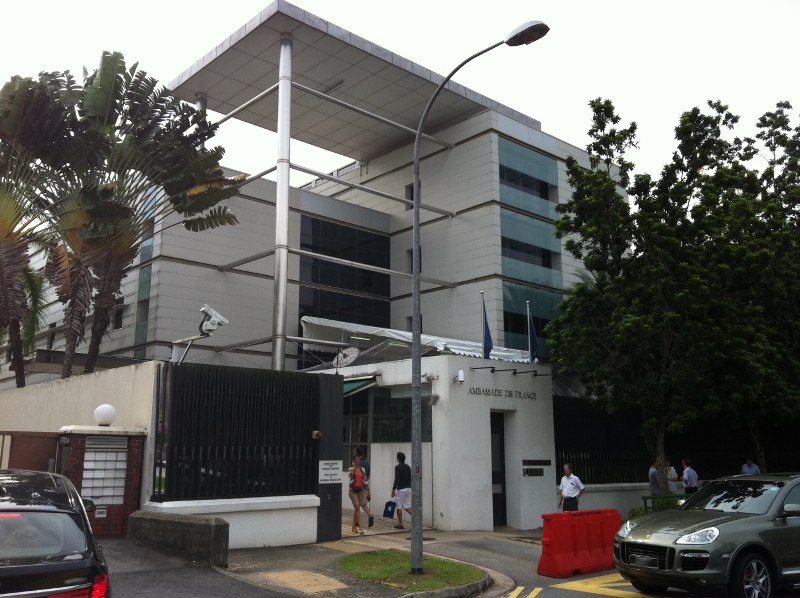
Embassy of France in Singapore

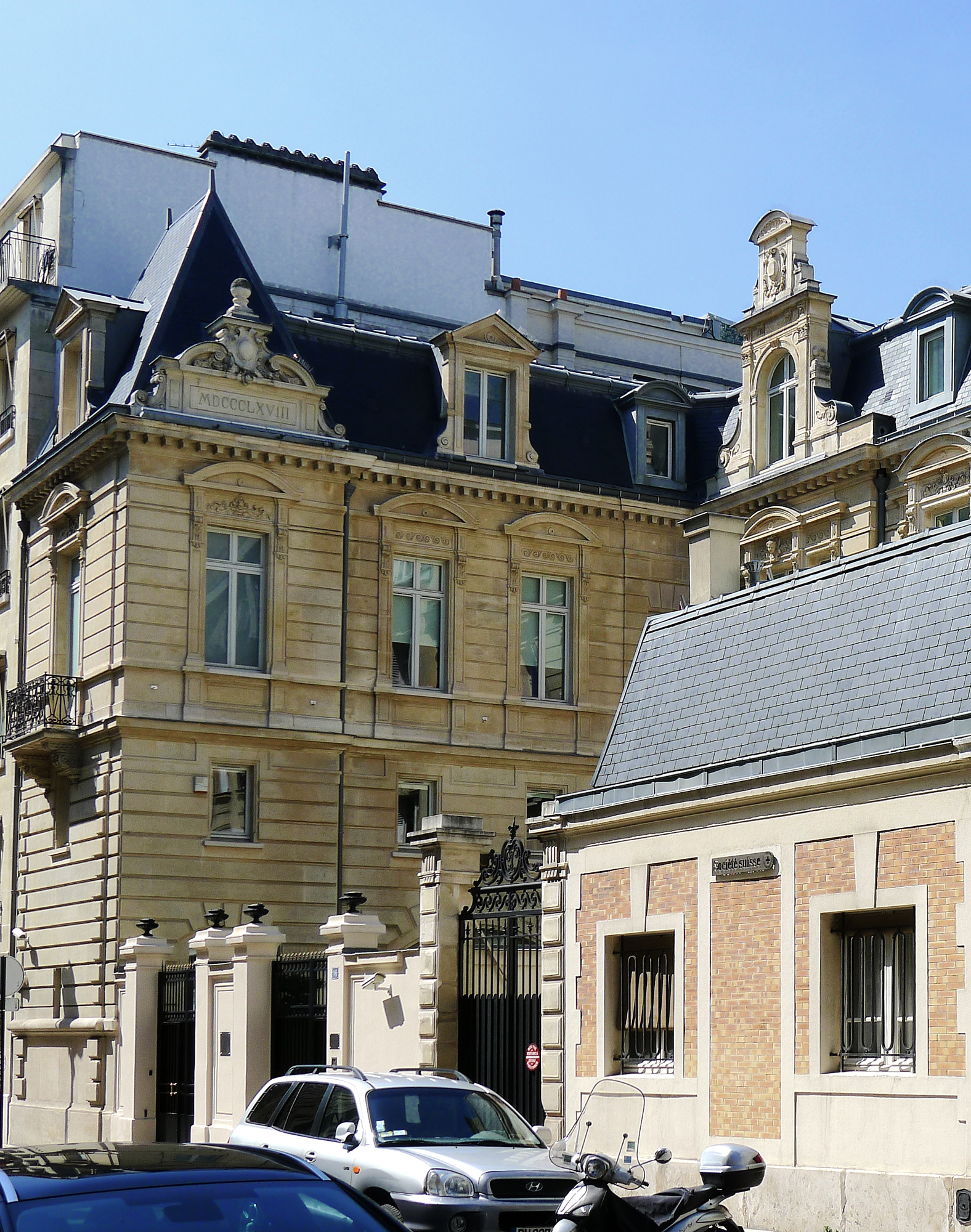
Embassy of Singapore in Paris

== See also ==
- Foreign relations of France
- Foreign relations of Singapore
- French School of Singapore
