= Foundation for California Community Colleges =

Nonprofit organization in US for California Community Colleges

- Official Logo
- Formation: 1998
- Founded: 1998; 28 years ago
- Founder: Dr. Larry Toy
- Type: 501(c)(3) tax-exempt
- Location: Sacramento, California, US
- Region served: California and 12 other states
- Key people: Keetha Mills, President and Chief Executive Officer; Joseph Quintana, Chief Operating Officer; Melissa Conner, Chief Advancement Officer; Scott Travasos, Chief Financial Strategy Officer; Andrea Meyer, General Counsel; Bryan Miller, Vice President, Communications and Technology; Sandra Fried, Vice President, Student Success Center; Jorge J.C. Sales, Vice President, Program Development; Elaine Reodica, Executive Strategist, Organizational Culture and Engagement
- Revenue: $167 million
- Endowment: $127 million (2020)
- Employees: Over 700 full-time FCCC employees.
- Website: www.foundationccc.org

The Foundation for California Community Colleges (FoundationCCC) is a 501(c)(3) nonprofit organization with headquarters in Sacramento, California. Established in 1998 as the official nonprofit auxiliary to the California Community Colleges. The organization is overseen by a Board of Directors, where eleven members serve four-year terms with a term limit of three consecutive terms, for a maximum of twelve consecutive years of service.

FoundationCCC currently operates just over 70 programs and services that improve educational access and affordability, address basic needs, connect students to work-based learning, and tackle local climate change effects. The organization’s work is made possible through funding from and partnerships with philanthropy, public agencies, corporations, and donors. As of 2023, it is reported that FoundationCCC’s annual operating revenue is $167 million. The organization also manages over $127 million in endowment funds in perpetuity for student scholarships, real estate education, and nursing education, and operates a $29 million Innovation Fund.

== Organizational Highlights ==
FoundationCCC has six Areas of Impact which guide its work. These focus areas are: Student Success, Workforce Development, Equity, Community Impact, Climate Action, and System Support. Notable program developments across those areas include:

In 2023, FoundationCCC launched the Center for Climate Futures to work towards climate mitigation, adaptation, and resilience in collaboration with local colleges and communities. A $21.5 million US Economic Development Administration Good Jobs Challenge grant was given to the organization in 2022 to initiate the California Resilient Careers in Forestry program, to expand workforce development pathways in the forestry industry in rural areas of California significantly impacted by wildfires.

In 2022, as part of a statewide strategy for strengthening education-to-workforce pathways, FoundationCCC partnered with the California Department of General Services and the Office of Public School Construction, to launch the California Regional K-16 Education Collaboratives Grant Program. In the first phase of the project, $108.6 million was distributed to six grantees across education, vocational, and workforce programs who are addressing the income, racial, and gender inequalities in education and employment.

In 2021, FoundationCCC expanded on its partnerships with public agencies to build out the Community Impact Call Center to help distribute critical relief dollars to vulnerable communities throughout California. In the first year, $807 million in relief dollars were distributed to individuals and families through partnerships with the California Department of Social Services, California Air Resources Board, and more.

On October 20, 2020, the Jay Pritzker Foundation pledged $100 million to FoundationCCC, making it the largest philanthropic gift to community colleges at its time. The gift, which was $5 million annually over 20 years, formed the Finish Line Scholars Program which provides scholarships and emergency financial aid to students toward a finish-line goal of completing a certificate or degree at a California community college or transferring to a university. In 2008, FoundationCCC was also the recipient of an upfront gift of $25 million from the Bernard Osher Foundation to create the California Community Colleges Scholarship Endowment. The gift ignited a three-year fundraising campaign in partnership with several California community colleges and culminated in a $76 million scholarship endowment, which FoundationCCC continues to use to fund over 6,000 scholarships annually.

In 2012, with almost $1 million in support from the Kresge Foundation, FoundationCCC named “Student Success” as a flagship program to help improve pathways for educational success and workforce readiness in California. Shortly after, the organization founded the California Community Colleges Student Success Center, which functions as a strategic partner to the California Community Colleges Chancellor’s Office in its effort to implement large-scale, systemwide student success reforms. The Student Success Center continues to provide support for several student success initiatives, including Guided Pathways and Credit for Prior Learning.

In 2010, FoundationCCC announced a grant award of $20 million arising from the Reformulated Gasoline Settlement Fund. This cy pres fund was created as a result of an antitrust class action with a purpose to achieve a clean air or fuel efficiency benefit for California consumers. As a result, FoundationCCC administered the Vehicle Repair, Retirement and Replacement for Motorists (VRRRM) program, which helped consumers throughout California to repair, retire, or replace their high-polluting vehicles through the program’s completion in August 2012.

FoundationCCC launched CollegeBuys in 1999 as the first and only systemwide procurement program focused exclusively on the needs of community colleges. Microsoft software was the first offering, resulting in significant cost savings for colleges and students. Today, the program provides procurement services and contracts with brands including Amazon, Office Depot, Blackboard, Turnitin, and more.

Shortly after FoundationCCC was founded in 1998, the organization created Career Catalyst, an employer of record service which handles “back office” administration tasks on behalf of employers, such as payroll and record keeping, to help connect more students with paid work experience. FoundationCCC started working with state agency partners to connect students with public service opportunities.

== Services provided ==
- Resource development and endowment management
- Program incubation, development, and management
- Facilitation of work-based learning opportunities
- Policy research and analysis
- Relief aid distribution
- Community outreach and multilingual call center support
- Training and technical assistance
- Fiscal sponsorship and management services
- Cooperative purchasing and procurement
- Philanthropic partnerships
- Scholarship administration
- Student-centered design
- Communications and marketing
- Technology and development
