= Foundation For Children =

Foundation For Children (FFC) is a non-profit and non-governmental organization helping children in Thailand. It was founded in 1978 and based in Bangkok.

In 2006, the Foundation For Children, with support of the Herbalife Family Foundation (HFF), established a Casa Herbalife program serving homeless and underprivileged children in Bangkok.

== Official objectives ==
- To provide opportunities for underprivileged and homeless children to fully develop their physical, intellectual and creative potentials
- To seek healthy alternatives in education and child-rearing in which the dignity of children is upheld and their opinions considered
- To assist and cooperate with the individuals and organizations working for children's education and welfare
- To bridge the differences between children and older generations, so those children may be recognized and treated as worthy and equal members of society
- To protect children who are abused and neglected, and to restore their family relationships
- To campaign for public awareness on children's rights

== Projects ==
- Nutrition help for malnourished children.
- Defence of children rights, through the work of the Center for the Protection of Children's Rights
- Preventing child prostitution, by the Center for the Protection of Children's Rights
- Alternative education, the Children's Village School (Moo Baan Dek)
- Creative media for children, through the FFC Publishing House
- Promotion of family roles in the prevention of child abuse
