= Friendship Christian School =

Friendship Christian School can refer to the following schools in the United States:

- Friendship Christian School (Georgia) in Suwanee, Georgia
- Friendship Christian School (Hawaii) in Ewa Beach, Hawaii
- Friendship Christian School (North Carolina) in Raleigh, North Carolina
- Friendship Christian School (Tennessee) in Lebanon, Tennessee
