= Compagnie Commerciale de Colonisation du Congo Français =

The Compagnie Commerciale de Colonisation du Congo Français, also known as the CCCCF or 4CF, was a colonial concession company set up in the Sangha River region of the Republic of the Congo in the early 20th century.

== See also ==
- Congo Free State
- Nieuwe Afrikaanse Handels-Vennootschap
- Compagnie de l'Ouham-Nana
