= Flower City Chaplain Corps =

Flower City Chaplain Corps Inc. (FCCC) is a Rochester, New York based non-profit Public Charity chaplaincy corps engaged in pastoral counseling at crime scenes, hospitals and businesses to provide crisis counseling during traumatic events.

== History ==
The organization's founder, Tommy Davis, a former correctional chaplain, former manufacturing CEO (Hope Initiatives CDC), and graduate of Apex School of Theology, Tennessee Temple University, and Piedmont International University (Ph.D.), served as its CEO until September 2017. As indicated on their website, the corps "seeks to sustain those in crisis, support those in need, and enhance the effectiveness of our towns, schools, police, firefighters, businesses, private citizens, and other public servants."

The FCCC was incorporated in the State of New York February 24, 2012 and received its tax exemption from the IRS in July 2013 as a charitable organization. It is registered with the New York State Public Charities Bureau. Their First Division central office is located at 244 Lake Road, in the town of Webster, New York.
