= FutureFuel =

FutureFuel Corporation
- Company type: Public
- Traded as: NYSE: FF
- Industry: Biofuels, Chemicals
- Headquarters: Clayton, Missouri
- Key people: Lee Mikles
- Products: Bioproducts
- Website: www.futurefuelcorporation.com

FutureFuel Corporation is a developer and producer of chemicals and biofuels. It is listed on the New York Stock Exchange, with symbol FF.

== History ==
In 2005 the company was founded in Clayton, Missouri as Viceroy Acquisition Corp., a Special-purpose acquisition company. In 2006 Viceroy acquired a plant in Batesville, Arkansas from Eastman Chemical and subsequently changed its name to FutureFuel. Lee Mikles was CEO from 2006 until 2013. Since 2013 Tony Novelly has been chairman and CEO.

== Operations ==
The company operates in two segments: chemicals and biofuels.

The company has a wholly owned subsidiary named FutureFuel Chemical Company, which develops various chemical products selling to third party customers. The chemical segment consists of two components, which are custom manufacturing that produce chemicals for specific customers, and performance multi-customer specialty chemicals. During 2011, about 50% of the company's revenue came from manufacturing specialty chemicals.

The biofuel segment mainly produce biodiesel, as well as petrodiesel. This operation segment is in central Arkansas, where the company owns 2,200 acres of land six miles southeast of Batesville, Arkansas.
