= F2C (disambiguation) =

F2C is a program that converts Fortran 77 to C.

F2C may also refer to:

- Bristol F.2C Badger, an aircraft design that was a precursor to the Bristol Badger
- Curtiss F2C, a designation of the Curtiss R2C
- Factory-to-consumer
- F2C, a racing class for model aircraft steered by control line
