= Canadian Child Care Federation =

The Canadian Child Care Federation (CCCF) is Canada's largest national service-based early learning and child care organization. Registered as a charitable status non-profit with Canada Revenue Agency since 1987, CCCF is a federation of 20 provincial/territorial organizations from across the country, representing 9,000 members – practitioners, academics, parents and policy makers. The organization aims to improve child care and early learning in Canada by supporting child care practitioners through the dissemination of applied research and best and promising practices.

Some of its cornerstone publications and resources include, the National Statement on Quality Child Care,(CCCF 1991), Occupational Standards for Child Care Practitioners (CCCF 2004) and Meeting the Challenge: Effective Strategies for Challenging Behaviours in Early Childhood Environments (1999) and their magazine, Interaction (ISSN 0835-5819)with their inaugural issue published in 1987. The CCCF believes strongly in social-emotional development and child-centred, play-based learning as approaches to quality child care. Crucial elements of quality child care also include collaborative relationship with families and a purposeful program that promotes children's development and a supported workforce.

== Funding ==
Primarily funded through project and program grants from the Government of Canada, Health and Welfare Minister Jake Epp announced the CCCF would be one of the first two projects funded under the Child Care Initiatives Fund back in 1988. Over the years, Health and Welfare Canada, now named, Human Resources Development Canada (HRDC), would be key supporters and funders for projects to support various research and outreach initiatives for children and child care as well as developing the early learning sector in Canada for child care services. In more recent years, since 2006, the CCCF has turned to private funders to support their work as the current Liberal Government under Prime Minister Justin Trudeau has shifted its child care policy by transferring the responsibility of child care to the provinces and to parents and the private sector.

== Children's rights ==
In its 25 years in operation, the CCCF has also played a role in advocating for children's rights both nationally and internationally. Since 1999, CCCF has been promoting children's rights and working in partnerships with leading children's rights organizations and leaders to develop resources for practitioners and parents. In 2005, in Geneva, Switzerland, the CCCF along with Senator Landon Pearson participated in the United Nations Day of General Discussion on Implementing Children's Rights. The CCCF contributed a paper entitled, "Keeping Our Promises: Rights from the Start," which analyzed the challenges inherent in promoting young children's rights in Canada. Along with the Canadian International Development Agency and UNICEF, the CCCF developed a poster entitled UN Convention on the Rights of the Child (in child-friendly language!). One way the CCCF promotes children's rights awareness is by celebrating National Child Day, which is now celebrated across Canada on November 20 each year. The day was proclaimed by the Government of Canada on March 19, 1993, to commemorate two historic events for children: the adoption of the United Nations Declaration on the Rights of the Child in 1959, and the UN adoption of the Convention on the Rights of the Child (CRC) in 1989.

== National Child Care Policy and Program ==
As a federation of 20 provincial/territorial affiliate child care organizations from across Canada, the CCCF has envisioned the development of a national child care policy and a national program for quality child care since it opened in 1987. In 1994, CCCF hosted a National Forum on Guiding Principles for Child Care in Canada. The Honourable Lloyd Axworthy, Minister of Human Resources and Social Development Canada (HRSDC) addressed the forum, and the two-day workshop resulted in guiding principles and building blocks for the next steps in the development of a national child care policy.

Under the federal Liberal government, on March 13, 2003, the Federal, Provincial and Territorial Ministers Responsible for Social Services signed the Multilateral Framework Agreement (MFA) on Early Learning and Child Care.

In 2005, the Liberal government of Paul Martin was hoping to create a national child care system based on Quebec's. The 2005 Canadian Federal Budget committed $5 billion over five years to enhance and expand early learning and child care in collaboration with provinces and territories, allocating $700 million in the 2006-2007 fiscal year and $1.2 billion in each of the next three years. The federal government entered into negotiations with individual provinces, leading to bilateral agreements with nine provinces between April and November 2005. In signing the agreements, provinces made a commitment to developing detailed Action Plans that identified their spending priorities, based on the QUAD principles of child care (quality, universality, accessibility and developmental programming), something which the CCCF helped to facilitate through its affiliates and child care sector expertise.

In 2006, the newly elected Conservative government under Stephen Harper eliminated the bilateral agreements as their first act of power. The plan was cancelled when they took office and replaced by the Universal Canada Child Benefit (UCCB) $100-a-month cheques for parents with young children with promised tax credits for private or profit care and up to $250 million annually to create child care spaces across the country.

In September, 2006, the Honourable Diane Finley, Minister of Human Resources and Social Development, announced the creation of a ministerial advisory committee that would advise her on the design of the Child Care Spaces Initiative. President of CCCF, Don Giesbrecht was appointed to this Ministerial Advisory Committee to provide advice on the approach and mechanisms required to effectively design and implement the federal government's Child Care Spaces Initiative, as well as provide formal recommendations to Minister Finley.

The Ministerial Advisory Committee on the Government of Canada's Child Care Spaces Initiative submitted its report in January 2007, outlining recommendations to: increase the supply of child care spaces, expand parental leave under Employment Insurance in order to decrease the demand for child care, increase parents' ability to pay for high-quality child care, increase awareness and understanding of child care needs, and address child care human resources challenges.

Since the report was tabled, in 2007, the federal government redirected the $250 million a year it had set aside for the Community Child Care Investment Program to provincial and territorial governments. And while the federal government promised to fund research, support early childhood development initiatives and work with not-for-profit organizations that focus on child care, such as CCCF and the Child Care Human Resources Sector Council (CCHRSC), the CCCF's annual reports show no funding or project activity with any federal departments. The CCHRSC has been cut from funding and is closing its doors in 2013. Several other child care organizations have closed due to being defunded by the current federal government, all of which have served children and families in Canada. With no ears from the current Conservative Government, the CCCF has been left to generosity of private funders and child care partner organizations. The CCCF continues its national child care and early learning policy discussions with international organizations such as UNICEF and the CCCF's network of provincial and territorial affiliates and members across Canada.

The CCCF's last direct correspondence with the recent federal government to provide leadership to develop a strong quality child care policy and plan was its submission to the House of Commons Standing Committee on Finance Pre-Budget Consultations for 2011. In the submission it states, "Canada is tied only with Ireland at the bottom of UNICEF's 2008 international comparison (Innocenti Research Centre – Report Card 8, 2008) of early childhood education and care, achieving only one benchmark each." So the CCCF continues its mission and goals by appealing to leadership on children's issues outside the Canadian federal government.
