= FC =

FC may refer to:

== Businesses, organisations, and schools ==
See also Sport, below.

- Fergusson College, a science and arts college in Pune, India
- Finncomm Airlines (IATA code)
- FranklinCovey company, NYSE stock symbol FC
- Frontier Corps, a paramilitary force in Pakistan
- U.S. Army Futures Center

== Science and technology ==
=== Computing ===
- fc (Unix), computer program that relists commands
- FC connector, a type of optical-fiber connector
- Flash controller
- Family Computer, video game console released in Japan in 1983, later redesigned and brought to the west as the Nintendo Entertainment System
- Fibre Channel, a serial computer bus
- File Compare (fc), an MS-DOS, OS/2 and Windows command line tool
- fc a casefolding feature in perl

=== Vehicles ===
- Fairchild FC, 1920s and 1930s aircraft
- A tenth generation Honda Civic
- Holden FC, a motor vehicle
- A second generation Mazda RX-7 car
- Fully cellular, a type of container ship

=== Other sciences ===
- Female condom (FC1, FC2), a contraceptive
- Foot-candle (symbol fc or ft-c), a unit of illumination
- Formal charge, a Lewis structure concept in chemistry
- Fuel cell, an electrochemical cell that converts the chemical energy from a fuel into electricity
- Ferrocenyl (denoted as Fc), an organoiron derivative
- Fragment crystallizable region, the tail end of an antibody, shortened to Fc.

== Sport ==
- Fielder's choice, in baseball statistics
- First-class cricket, a match classification
- Football club (association football), many association football clubs have "FC" at the beginning or the end

== Other uses ==
- FC (band), UK
- FC TV, a Brazilian television station
- Facilitated communication, a discredited communication technique in disabled care
- Fact-checking, a process of verifying information
- Fire Controlman, a rank of the U.S. Navy
- Province of Forlì-Cesena, Italy, vehicle registration code
- Forward caste, in Indian society
- Franking credit, a type of tax credit
- Freedom Club, a pseudonym of the "Unabomber" Ted Kaczynski
- Fucked Company, a defunct web site
- Full combo, a term used in rhythm games
- Functional conversation, designed to convey information in order to help achieve an individual or group goal
- Further Confusion, a furry convention held in the Bay Area of California each January
- EA Sports FC, video game series developed by EA

== See also ==
- Flucytosine or 5-FC, an antifungal medication
