= List of acronyms: F =

This list contains acronyms, initialisms, and pseudo-blends that begin with the letter F.

For the purposes of this list:

- acronym = an abbreviation pronounced as if it were a word, e.g., SARS = severe acute respiratory syndrome, pronounced to rhyme with cars
- initialism = an abbreviation pronounced wholly or partly using the names of its constituent letters, e.g., CD = compact disc, pronounced cee dee
- pseudo-blend = an abbreviation whose extra or omitted letters mean that it cannot stand as a true acronym, initialism, or portmanteau (a word formed by combining two or more words).

(a) = acronym, e.g.: SARS – (a) severe acute respiratory syndrome
(i) = initialism, e.g.: CD – (i) compact disc
(p) = pseudo-blend, e.g.: UNIFEM – (p) United Nations Development Fund for Women
(s) = symbol (none of the above, representing and pronounced as something else; for example: MHz – megahertz)

Some terms are spoken as either acronym or initialism, e.g., VoIP, pronounced both as voyp and V-O-I-P.

(Main list of acronyms)

- f – (s) Femto
- F – (s) Farad – Fluorine

== FA ==
- fa – (s) Persian language (ISO 639-1 code)
- FA – Food Addicts in Recovery Anonymous
- fA – (s) Femtoampere
- FA
  - (i) Field Artillery
  - Financial aid
  - Football Association (England)
  - Football Australia (governing body for association football)
- FAA
  - (i) U.S. Federal Aviation Administration
  - Financial Aid Administrator
  - Fleet Air Arm
  - Functional Area Analysis
- FAAD – (a) Forward Area Air Defence
- FAAN – (i) Fellow of the American Academy of Neurology
- FAAFP – (i)Fellow of the American Academy of Family Physicians
- FAAN – (i) Fellow of the American Academy of Nursing
- FAANG – Facebook, Amazon, Apple, Netflix, Google (the leading stocks in the late-2010s US market rally) (c.f. FANG, which originally did not include Apple)
- FAAQ – (a/i) Frequently Asked and Anticipated Questions (cf. FAQ)
- FAASV – (i) Field Artillery Ammunition Supply Vehicle
- FAB – (i) Feline Advisory Bureau (UK feline charity)
  - (i) Forward Air Controller
  - Front of Allies for Change
  - Frontal Affinity Chromatography
  - Full Aperture Calibrator
- FACA – (a) (US) Federal Advisory Committee Act
- FACH – (a) Fuerza Aérea de Chile
- FACN – (i) Fellow of the American College of Nutrition
- FACP – (i) Fellow of the American College of Physicians
- FACS
  - (i) Fellow of the American College of Surgeons
  - (a) Formal Aspects of Computing Science
  - Fluorescent-activated cell sorting
- FACTS – (a) Flexible Alternating Current Transmission System
- FAD
  - (i) Flavin Adenine Dinucleotide
  - (a) Funding Authorization Document
- M18 FADAC – (p) Field Artillery Data Computer
- FADEC - (a) Full Authority Digital Engine (or Electronic) Control
- FAFSA – (a) Free Application for Federal Student Aid (US)
- FAH
  - (i) Federation of American Hospitals
  - Fine Arts and Humanities
  - Foreign Affairs Handbook
- FAI
  - (i) Fédération Aéronautique Internationale (French, "International Aeronautics Federation")
  - Football Association of Ireland
- FAL - (a) Fusil Automatique Léger (French, Light Automatic Rifle), Belgian battle rifle
- FAM – (i) Foreign Affairs Manual
- fao – (s) Faroese language (ISO 639-2 code)
- FAO – (i) Food and Agriculture Organization
- FAPA – Fellow of the American Psychological Association
- FAPHA – Fellow of the American Public Health Association
- FAQ – (a/i) Frequently Asked Questions (sometimes pronounced "fak")
- FARC – (a) Fuerzas Armadas Revolucionarias de Colombia (Spanish, "Revolutionary Armed Forces of Colombia")
- FARDC – (a) "Military of the Democratic Republic of the Congo
- FARP – (a) Forward Arming and Refuelling Point / Forward Area Rearm/refuel Point
- fas – (s) Persian language (ISO 639-2 code)
- FAS
  - (i) Federation of American Scientists
  - Fetal Alcohol Syndrome
- FASCAM – (p) Family of Scatterable Mines
- FASD – (i) Fetal Alcohol Spectrum Disorder
- FASEB – (a/i) Federation of American Societies for Experimental Biology
- FAST
  - (a) Face, Arm, Speech, Time (stroke symptoms)
  - Five hundred meter Aperture Spherical Telescope (Chinese radio telescope)
  - Fixing America's Surface Transportation Act (U.S. legislation)
- FAT – (a) Field Artillery Tractor – File Allocation Table
- FAVS – (a) Future Armoured Vehicle System
- FAW
  - (i) Football Association of Wales
  - First Automobile Works (Chinese automobile manufacturer)

== FB ==
- FB – Facebook, An on-line social network
- FBCB2 or FBCB^{2} – (p) Force XXI Battle Command, Brigade-and-Below
- FBCS – (i) Fellow of the British Computer Society
- FBI – (i) Federal Bureau of Investigation
- FBIS – (i) Foreign Broadcast Information Service
- FBIDST – (i) Fellow of the British Institute of Dental and Surgical Technologists
- FBLA (i) Future Business Leaders of America {Jr & HS Group}
- FBM – (s) Board foot
- FBR
  - (i) Fast Breeder Reactor
  - Foundation for Biomedical Research
  - Friedman, Billings, Ramsey (now known as Arlington Asset Investment)
- FBS
  - Federal Bureau of Statistics (Pakistan)
  - Fetal bovine serum
  - Football Bowl Subdivision (U.S. college football)
  - Fukuoka Broadcasting Corporation

== FC ==
- fC – (s) Femtocoulomb
- FC
  - (i) Fire Control
  - Football Club
  - (s) Funnel Cloud (METAR Code)
- FCA
  - (i) Fellowship of Christian Athletes
  - Fiat Chrysler Automobiles
  - Fraction of Combat Active forces
- FCC – (i) U.S. Federal Communications Commission
- FCE – (i) First Certificate in English
- FCF – (i) Financial Free Cash Flow
- FCFS – (i) First Come, First Served
- FCM
  - (i) Federation of Canadian Municipalities
  - Fogarty's Cove Music
- FCO – (i) UK Foreign and Commonwealth Office
- FCS
  - (i) Football Championship Subdivision (U.S. college football)
  - Future Combat System
- FCSB – (i) Fotbal Club Steaua București, a name claimed by two association football clubs in Bucharest – FCSB and CSA Steaua București
- FCW – (i) Florida Championship Wrestling
  - FCW - Forward Collision Warning, see Collision avoidance system
- FCZ – (i) Forward Combat Zone

== FD ==
- FD – (i) Falun Dafa
- FDA – (i) Food and Drug Administration (U.S.)
- FDBK – (i) Feedback
- FDC
  - (i) Federal Detention Center (U.S.)
  - Fire Direction Centre
- FDDI – (i) Fibre Distributed Data Interface
- FdI – (i) Fratelli d'Italia (Italian, "Brothers of Italy"), an Italian political party
- FDI
  - (i) Fault detection and isolation
  - Films Division of India, a government film production agency
  - Flexible Display Interface
  - Foreign direct investment
  - Frégate de défense et d'intervention (French, "Defense and Intervention Frigate"), a planned class of French Navy ships
- FDNY – Fire Department of New York
- FDR
  - (i) Flight data recorder
  - Franklin Delano Roosevelt

== FE ==
- Fe – (s) Iron (Latin Ferrum)
- FE – (i) Fully Exposed (armoured vehicle target, as opposed to Hull-Down)
- FEAR
  - (a) First Encounter Assault Recon
  - Focus sash Endeavor (Quick) Attack Rattata (or Fucking Evil Annoying Rodent), a last-resort tactic in competitive Pokemon battling
- FEAST – (a/i) Forum for European-Australian Science and Technology Cooperation
- FEATS – (a) Festival of European Anglophone Theatrical Societies
- FEB
  - (i) Federación Española de Baloncesto (Spanish, "Spanish Basketball Federation")
  - Federatie Eredivisie Basketball (Dutch, "Federation Honorary Division (of) Basketball"), the former name of the basketball competition later known in Dutch by the English-language Dutch Basketball League
  - Força Expedicionária Brasileira (Portuguese, "Brazilian Expeditionary Force")
- FEBA – (a) Forward Edge of the Battle Area
- fec. – (p) fecit (Latin, "he made it")
- FED – (a/i) Field emission display
- FEF – (i) Frontal Eye Field (neurophysiology)
- FEI – (i) Fédération équestre internationale (French, "International Federation for Equestrian Sports")
- FEMA
  - (a/i) Farm Equipment Manufacturers Association
  - (a/i) U.S. Federal Emergency Management Agency
- FENAFUTH – (p) Federación Nacional Autónoma de Fútbol de Honduras (Spanish, "National Autonomous Football Federation of Honduras")
- FENS – (a/i) Federation of European Neuroscience Societies
- FEP – (i) Firepower Enhancement Program – Fleet satellite (FLTSAT) Extremely high frequency (EHF) Package
- FEPAFUT – (p) Federación Panameña de Fútbol (Spanish, "Panamanian Football Federation")
- FES – (i) Flywheel Energy Storage
- FEST – (a) Frankfurt English Speaking Theatre
- FET – (a) Field-effect transistor
- FEZ – (a/i) Fighter Engagement Zone

== FF ==
- ff – (s) Fula language (ISO 639-1 code)
- fF – (s) Femtofarad
- FF
  - (i) Final Fantasy
  - (p) Firefox (Web browser)
- FFA
  - (i) Football Federation Australia, former name of the governing body now known as Football Australia
  - Pacific Islands Forum Fisheries Agency
  - Free-Fire Area
  - Fusiform Face Area
  - Future Farmers of America (today the National FFA Organization)
- FFB – (i) Frum From Birth (referring to an observant Jew born into a religiously observant family)
- FFC – (i) Free For Chat
- FFCM — Fellow of the Faculty of Community Medicine (fellowship created in 1972, now replaced by FFPH)
- FFE – (i) Fukuoka Futures Exchange
- FFF – (i) Fédération française de football (French, "French Football Federation")
- FFG – (s) Guided Missile Frigate (hull classification symbol)
- FFOV – (i) Forward Field Of View
- FFP - (i) Federally Funded Participation
- FFPH — Fellow of the Faculty of Public Health, replacing FFPHM
- FFR – (i) Fédération française de rugby (French, "French Rugby (Union) Federation")
- FFS – (i) For Fuck's Sake
- FFT
  - (i) Fast Fourier transform
  - Final Fantasy Tactics

== FG ==
- FG – (i) Falun Gong
- fg – (s) Femtogram
- FG – (s) Fog (METAR Code) – French Guiana (FIPS 10-4 territory code)
- FGR – (a) Flickr Group Roulette

== FH ==
- fH – (s) Femtohenry
- FHFIF – (i) Foster's Home for Imaginary Friends
- FHI – (i) Family Health International, Fuji Heavy Industries, Ltd.

== FI ==
- fi – (s) Finnish language (ISO 639-1 code)
- FI – (s) Finland (ISO 3166 digram; FIPS 10-4 country code)
- FIA – (a) Fédération internationale de l'automobile (French "International Automobile Federation")
- FIAT – (a) Fabbrica Italiana Automobili Torino (Italian "Italian Car Factory of Turin")
- FIBA – originally (a) Fédération internationale de basket-ball amateur (French, "International Amateur Basketball Federation"); since 1989, (p) Fédération internationale de basket-ball
- FIBUA – (i/a) Fighting In Built-Up Areas
- FIC – (i) Fellowship for Intentional Community
- FID – (i) Foreign Internal Defence
- FIDÉ – (a) Fédération internationale des échecs (French, "World Chess Federation")
- FIE – (i) Fly-In Echelon
- FIFA – (a) Fédération internationale de football association (French, "International Association Football Federation")
- FIFe – (a) Fédération internationale féline (French, "International Feline Federation")
- FIFO – (a) First In, First Out
- FIFRA – (a) Federal Insecticide, Fungicide, and Rodenticide Act
- FIG
  - (i) Fédération internationale des géomètres (French, "International Federation of Surveyors")
  - Fédération internationale de gymnastique (French, "International Federation of Gymnastics")
  - Feminist Improvising Group (music ensemble)
- fij – (s) Fijian language (ISO 639-2 code)
- FILA – (a) Fédération internationale des luttes associées (French, "International Federation of Associated Wrestling Styles"), former name of the sport governing body now known as United World Wrestling
- FILO – (a) First In, Last Out (see also LIFO)
- FIMPT – (i) Fellow of the Institute of Maxillofacial Prosthetists and Technologists
- fin – (s) Finnish language (ISO 639-2 code)
- FIN – (s) Finland (ISO 3166 trigram)
- FINA – (p/a) Fédération internationale de natation (French, "International Swimming Federation")
- FIPS – (a) Federal Information Processing Standard
- FIR
  - (i) Final Inspection Report
  - Federazione Italiana Rugby (Italian, "Italian Rugby (Union) Federation")
- FIRES – Fever Induced Refractory Epilepsy Syndrome or Febrile Infection-Related Epilepsy Syndrome
- FIS – (a/i) Fédération internationale de ski (French "International Ski Federation")
- FISA – (a) Fédération Internationale des Sociétés d'Aviron (French, "International Federation of Rowing Associations")
- FISH – (a) Fluorescence In-Situ Hybridisation
- FiST – (p) Fire Support Team
- FITS – (a) Flexible Image Transport System
- FIU – (i) Florida International University

== FJ ==
- fj – (s) Fijian language (ISO 639-1 code)
- fJ – (s) Femtojoule
- FJ – (s) Fiji (ISO 3166 digram; FIPS 10-4 country code)
- FJD – (s) Fiji dollar (ISO 4217 currency code)
- FJI – (s) Fiji (ISO 3166 trigram)
- FJN – (a) Financial Job Network

== FK ==
- fK – (s) Femtokelvin
- FK – (s) Falkland Islands (ISO 3166 code)
- FKA - (i) Formerly known as
- FKP – (s) Falkland Islands pound (ISO 4217 currency code)
- FKSM – (i) Fort Knox Supplemental Manual
- FKT – (i) Fastest known time

== FL ==
- fl – (p) floruit (Latin, "living") (genealogy)
- fL – (s) Femtolitre
- FL – (s) Florida (postal symbol)
- FLA – (p) Florida – (i) Front Line Assembly – Future Large Aircraft
- FLAC – (a/i) Free Lossless Audio Codec
- FLAC – (a/i) Free Legal Advice Centres
- FLAK – (p) FLugAbwehrKanone (German for "Anti-Aircraft Guns")
- FLB – (i) Forward Logistics Base
- FLET – (a/i) Forward Line of Enemy Troops
- FLG – (p) Falun Gong
- FLIP – (p) Flight Information Publication
- FLIR – (i) Forward Looking InfraRed (sensor)
- FLK – (s) Falkland Islands (ISO 3166 trigram)
  - Also Funny-Looking Kid, a medical initialism for a young child with a mostly normal but somewhat unusual ("funny") appearance that raises the suspicion index for congenital disorder. Used only before a medical diagnosis has determined the cause of the unusual appearance.
- FLOT – (a/i) Forward Line of Own Troops
- FLSA – (i) Fair Labor Standards Act
- FLQ – (i) Front de libération du Québec (French for "Québec Liberation Front")
- FLTSAT – (p) Fleet Satellite
- FLTSATCOM – (p) Fleet Satellite Communication System

== FM ==
- FM – (s) Factory Mutual http://fmglobal.com
- fm – (s) Femtometre
- Fm – (s) Fermium
- FM
  - (i) Federal Magistrate (Australian post-nominal)
  - (s) Federated States of Micronesia (postal symbol; ISO 3166 digram; FIPS 10-4 territory code)
  - (i) Field Manual
  - Flight Manager
  - Frequency Modulation (electronics)
- FMC
  - (i) Federal Magistrates' Court (an Australian federal court, formerly FMS)
  - Food Machinery Corporation (original name of the company now known as FMC Corporation)
- FMCA – (i) Federal Magistrates' Court of Australia (used for citing decisions of the FMC other than family law decisions)
- FMCAfam – (i) Federal Magistrates' Court of Australia: family (used for citing family law decisions of the FMC)
- FME – (i) Formal Methods Europe
- FMECA – (i) Failure Modes and Effect Criticality Analysis
- FMJD – (i) Fédération Mondiale du Jeu de Dames
- FMLA – (i) Family Medical Leave Act
- Fmr – Former (as in "Fmr. president")
- fMRI – (i) Functional Magnetic Resonance Imaging
- FMS
  - (i) Federal Magistrates Service (an Australian federal court, now FMC)
  - (i) Flight Management System
  - Foreign Military Sales
- FMSF – (i) False Memory Syndrome Foundation
- FMTV – (i) Family of Medium Tactical Vehicles
- FMCG – (i) Fast-Moving Consumer Goods

== FN ==
- fN – (s) Femtonewton
- Fabrique Nationale (Belgian firearms manufacturer)
- FNA – (i) Functional Needs Analysis
- FNaF - (a) Five Nights at Freddy’s (horror video game series)

== FO ==
- fo – (s) Faroese language (ISO 639-1 code)
- FO
  - (s) Faroe Islands (ISO 3166 digram; FIPS 10-4 territory code)
  - (i) Force Operations (military)
  - Forward Observer
  - Frame Optional (military symbology)
- FOAD – (a) Fuck Off And Die
- FOAF – (a) Friend Of A friend
- FoB – (i) Free On Board (shipping)
- FOB
  - (i/a) Forward Operating Base
  - Fall Out Boy
- FOC
  - (i) First of Class
  - Forward of center (measure of weight bias of an arrow)
  - Full Operational Capability
- FOD - Foreign Object Debris
- FoE
  - (a/p) Federation of Earth
  - (p) Friends of the Earth
- FOGC – (i) Federal Oil and Gas Council
- FOH – (a) Front Of House
- FOIA – (a) Freedom of Information Act
- FOM – (a) Federation Object Model
- FOMO – (a) Fear of missing out
- FONSI – (a) Finding of No Significant Impact
- FOO – (a) Forward Observation Officer
- FOR
  - (i) Field Of Regard
  - Frame Of Reference
- Fortran – (p) The IBM Mathematical FORmula TRANslating System (programming language)
- FOS
  - (i) Florida Ornithological Society
  - Full Operational Status
- FoS – (i) Family of Systems
- FOSE – (p) Fallout 3 Script Extender
- FOSE – (a) Federal Office Systems Expo
- FOT – (i) Free on truck
- FOTA – (i) Fellow of the Orthodontic Technicians Association
- FOTC – Flight of the Conchords
- FOUO – (i) For Official Use Only
- FOV – (i) Field Of View

== FP ==
- FP – (s) French Polynesia (FIPS 10-4 territory code)
- FPF
  - (i) Federação Portuguesa de Futebol ("Portuguese Football Federation" in that language)
  - Final Protective Fire
- fps – (s) frames per second (motion pictures, television, computer graphics)
- FPS
  - (i) Fire Prevention System
  - First-person shooter (computer/video games)

== FQ ==
- FQ – (s) Baker Island (FIPS 10-4 territory code) – French Southern and Antarctic Territories (ISO 3166 digram; obsolete 1979)
- FQDN – (i) Fully Qualified Domain Name

== FR ==
- fr – (i) For real
- fr – (s) French language (ISO 639-1 code)
- Fr – (s) Francium
- FR – (s) France (FIPS 10-4 country code; ISO 3166 digram)
- fra – (s) French language (ISO 639-2 code)
- FRA
  - (i) Federal Railroad Administration
  - (s) France (ISO 3166 trigram)
- FRAGO – (p) Fragmentary Order (military)
- FRAND – (a) Fair, reasonable, and non-discriminatory (concept in standards-setting and intellectual property law)
- FRCP
  - (i) Federal Rules of Civil Procedure
  - Fellow of the Royal College of Physicians
- FRICBM – (i) Full Range ICBM
- frr – (s) North Frisian language (ISO 639-2 code)
- FRR
  - (s) Falls Road Railroad (reporting mark)
  - (i) Federaţia Română de Radioamatorism (Romanian, "Romanian Amateur Radio Federation")
  - (i) Fix, Rebuild, Replace
  - Federaţia Română de Rugby (Romanian, "Romanian Rugby (Union) Federation")
- FRO – (s) Faroe Islands (ISO 3166 trigram)
- FRS
  - (i) Fellow of the Royal Society
  - U.S. Federal Reserve System
- FRSA – (i) Fellow of the Royal Society of Art
- FRSL – (i) Fellow of the Royal Society of Literature
- fry – (s) West Frisian language (ISO 639-2 code)
- FRY – (i) Federal Republic of Yugoslavia

== FS ==
- fs – (s) Femtosecond
- fS – (s) Femtosiemens
- FS
  - (i) Fire Support (military)
  - (s) French Southern and Antarctic Territories (FIPS 10-4 territory code)
- FSA
  - (i) Fire Support Area
  - UK Food Standards Agency
  - Functional Solution Analysis
- FSB
  - (i) Federal'naya Sluzhba Bezopasnosti Rossiyskoi Federatsii (Федера́льная слу́жба безопа́сности Росси́йской Федера́ции, Russian "Federal Security Service of the Russian Federation", succeeded the FSK in 1995)
  - Forward Support Battalion
- FSC
  - (i) Federal Supply Classification
  - (a) Forest Stewardship Council (ecological pressure group)
- FSCL – (i) Fire Support Co-ordination Line
- FSE – (i) Fire Support Element
- F&SF – (i) (The Magazine of) Fantasy & Science Fiction
- FSF – (i) Free Software Foundation
- FSH – (i) Follicle-stimulating hormone
- FSI – (i) Fuel Stratified Injection
- FSK – (i) Federal'naya Sluzhba Kontrrazvedki (Федера́льная Слу́жба Контрразве́дки, Russian "Federal Counterintelligence Service", succeeded the KGB in 1991)
- FSM
  - (s) Federated States of Micronesia (ISO 3166 trigram)
  - (i) Flying Spaghetti Monster (satirical religion)
- FSO
  - (i) Fire Support Officer
  - Flotilla Staff Officer
  - Foreign Service Officer
- FSS – (i) Fire Support Station
- FSSP – (i) Families of Structurally Similar Proteins
- FST
  - (i) Finance Support Team
  - Finlands Svenska Television (Finland's Swedish-language television)
  - Future Soviet Tank (Cold War era)
- FSTC – (i) Foreign Science Technology Center (now NGIC)
- FSV
  - (i) Fire Support Vehicle
  - Fisheries Survey Vessel
  - Flexible Sender Validation
  - Fort St. Vrain
  - Fußball und Sportverein (German "Football and Sport Association", as in FSV Mainz)

== FT ==
- fT – (s) Femtotesla
- FTC – (i) Federal Trade Commission
- FTE – (i) Full Time Equivalent
- FTL – (i) Faster Than Light
- FTP – (i) File Transfer Protocol
- FTS
  - (i) Flight Termination System used during some rocket launches
  - Follow-the-sun
  - Fuck/Forget That/This Shit
- FTSE – (a/i) Financial Times Stock Exchange ("footsie")
- FTW – (i) For The Win (a commonly used phrase used online to indicate success), Fuck the World, Forever Together Wherever (gang slogan)

== FU ==
- FU
  - (s) Smoke (METAR Code)
  - (p) "Fuck You"
- FUBAR – (a) Fucked/Fouled Up Beyond All Recognition/Repair
- f/u/b/o – (i) For the use and benefit of (found in legal documents)
- FUBU - (a) For Us, By Us
- FUCK – (a) For, Unlawful, Carnal, Knowledge (Van Halen album title)
- FUD – (a) Fear, Uncertainty & Doubt (marketing strategy)
- FUGAZI (acronym) – (a) British/American Army slang, then Video Gamer FPS slang for Fucked Up, Got Ambushed, Zipped In.
- ful – (s) Fula language (ISO 639-2 code)

== FV ==
- fV – (s) Femtovolt

== FW ==
- fW – (s) Femtowatt
- FW – (s) Forward
- F/W – (i) Fixed Wing
- FWC – (i) Football World Cup
- FWD - (a) Front Wheel Drive (automobile transmission type)
- FWF – (i) Fixed Word Format
- FWI – (i) French West Indies
- FWIW – (i) For What It's Worth
- FWS – (i) U.S. Fish and Wildlife Service
- FWT – (i) Fresh Water Tank

== FX ==
- FX – (a) Firefox – Fox Extended – (s) Metropolitan France (ISO 3166 digram; obsolete 1997) – Special effect
- FXX – (s) Metropolitan France (ISO 3166 trigram; obsolete 1997)

== FY ==
- fy – (s) West Frisian language (ISO 639-1 code)
- FY – (i) Fiscal Year – (s) Former Yugoslav Republic of Macedonia (NATO country code)
- FYA – (i) For Your Agenda
- FYI – (i) For Your Information
- FYROM – (a) Former Yugoslav Republic of Macedonia, currently North Macedonia

== FZ ==
- FZDZ – (s) Freezing Drizzle (METAR Code)
- FZFG – (s) Freezing Fog (METAR Code)
- FZRA – (s) Freezing Rain (METAR Code)
