= FPS =

FPS or fps may refer to:

== Arts and entertainment ==
- "F.P.S." (Law & Order: Criminal Intent), an episode of the TV show Law & Order: Criminal Intent
- The Fabulous Picture Show, a television show on Al Jazeera English
- Funday PawPet Show, an Internet puppet show
- FPS Magazine, a defunct magazine about animation
- Five Point Someone, a novel by Chetan Bhagat
- Front Porch Step, an American musician
- Facepunch Studios, a British video game developer
- First-person shooter, a video game genre centered around gun and other weapon-based combat in a first-person perspective

== Education ==
- Fargo Public Schools, North Dakota, United States
- Foundation Public School, Pakistan
- French Pastry School, a cooking school in Chicago, Illinois, United States
- Future Problem Solvers, an educational competition
- Freeport Public Schools, New York, United States

== Finance ==
- Faster Payment System (United Kingdom), a British banking initiative
- Faster Payment System (Hong Kong), a Hong Kong payment system
- Faster Payment System (Russia), a Russian payment system

== Government and politics ==
- Facilities Protection Service, of the Government of Iraq
- Federal Protective Service (Russia)
- Federal Protective Service (United States)
- Federal Public Service, of the Federal Government of Belgium
- Free Party Salzburg (German: Freie Partei Salzburg), a political party in Austria
- Freedom Party of South Tyrol (German: Freiheitliche Partei Südtirols), a defunct political party in Italy

== Science and technology ==
=== Units of measure ===
- Foot per second
- Foot-pound-second system
- Frames per second, the frequency (rate) at which consecutive images (frames) appear on a display

=== Computing ===
- FairPlay Streaming, a digital rights management technology by Apple
- Fast packet switching, in networks
- Fitness proportionate selection, a genetic operator used in genetic algorithms
- Floating Point Systems, a defunct American computer hardware company

=== Other uses in science and technology ===
- Fear-potentiated startle, a reflexive physiological reaction
- Fission power system
- Focal-plane shutter, in optical systems
- Forties pipeline system in the North Sea
- Frontal protection system, for vehicles
- Sn-glycerol-3-phosphate 2-alpha-galactosyltransferase, also known as floridoside-phosphate synthase

== Sports ==
- France Poker Series, poker tour in France and French speaking countries
- FPS (ice hockey), a Finnish ice hockey team
- Frames per stop, a bowling industry term

== Other uses ==
- Fellow of the Pharmaceutical Society of Australia
- Finchley Progressive Synagogue

== See also ==
- FP (disambiguation)
