= Fogh =

Fogh is a surname. It may refer to:

- Anders Fogh Rasmussen (born 1953), Danish politician
- Birgit Fogh-Andersen (1922–2012), Danish politician
- Jørgen Fogh (1631–1685) was a Danish Supreme Court justice and mayor of Copenhagen
- Mads Fogh (born 1988), Danish professional football player
- Stig Fogh Andersen (born 1950), Danish operatic tenor
- Torkel Weis-Fogh (1922–1975), Danish zoologist

== See also ==
- Fogher
- FOH
