= Irvoll =

Irvoll is a Norwegian surname. Notable people with the surname include:

- Fam Irvoll (born 1980), Norwegian fashion designer
- Grethe Irvoll (born 1939), Norwegian feminist and politician
