= FNS =

FNS may refer to:

== Television ==
- Food Network Star, an American reality television series
- Fox News Sunday, an American television news show
- Fuji Network System, a Japanese television network
- WWE Friday Night SmackDown, an American sports television show

== Other uses ==
- Factorial number system
- Federal News Service, an American transcription service
- Federal Taxation Service, a body of the Russian Federal government
- Federated Naming Service
- Finnish Navy Ship, a ship prefix
- Fire and Skoal, a student society at Dartmouth College
- Food and Nutrition Service, an agency of the United States Department of Agriculture
- Frontier Nursing Service, an American nursing organization
- FN FNS, a semi-automatic pistol
- National Salvation Front (Russia), a defunct political coalition
- Swiss National Science Foundation (French: Fonds national suisse)

== See also ==
- FN (disambiguation)
