= FIDS =

FIDS may refer to:

- Flight information display system
- Falkland Islands Dependencies Survey

== See also ==
- FID (disambiguation)
