= FOD =

FOD may refer to:

== Music ==
- F.O.D. (band), a Belgian punk rock band
- "F.O.D. (Fuck of Death)", a song by Canadian extreme metal band Slaughter
- Flag of Democracy, an American hardcore punk band
- "F.O.D.", a song on Green Day's album Dookie

== Organizations ==
- Friends of Democracy, Inc., an anti-fascist propaganda and educational group
- The F.O.D. Control Corporation
- Funny or Die, an American comedy production company

== Media ==
- FOD (streaming service), a Japanese on-demand media service
- Films on demand; see video on demand

== Transportation ==
- Ford railway station, in England
- Foreign object damage, damage to aircraft caused by debris
- Fort Dodge Regional Airport, in Iowa, United States

== Other uses ==
- Foodo language, spoken in Benin
- Framework-oriented design
- Friend of Dorothy, a term for a gay man
