= FBS =

FBS may refer to:

== Schools ==
- Faith Baptist School (disambiguation)
- France Business School, in France
- Friern Barnet School, in London
- Friends Boys' School, one of two Ramallah Friends Schools in the West Bank

== Science and medicine ==
- Failed back syndrome
- Fasting blood sugar
- Fetal bovine serum
- Frontiers in Bioscience, an academic journal
- Function-Behaviour-Structure ontology
- Lees-Haley Fake Bad Scale

== Other uses ==
- FBS Radio Network, Philippine radio network
- Federal Bureau of Statistics of the Government of Pakistan
- Fellow of the Burgon Society, in the United Kingdom
- Friday Harbor Seaplane Base, in Washington, United States
- Fukuoka Broadcasting System, a Japanese TV station
- Furness Building Society, a British financial institution
- NCAA Division I Football Bowl Subdivision, highest level of college football in the United States

== See also ==
- FB (disambiguation)
