= Saiko =

Saiko may refer to:

- Saikō, a Japanese era
- Saiko, a Spanish singer
- Saiko (band), a Chilean rock band
- Saiko Lake, in Yamanashi Prefecture, Japan

== People ==
- Ema Saikō (江馬 細香, 1787–1861), Japanese painter, poet and calligrapher
- Jean-Philippe Saïko (born 1990), New Caledonian footballer
- Shaun Saiko (born 1989), Canadian soccer player
- Saiko Takahashi (高橋 彩子, born 1976), Japanese women's footballer

== See also ==
- Psycho (disambiguation)
- Saiko (comics), a fictional character in the comic book series Nightwing
- Saikot, a village in Uttarakhand, India
- Seiko (disambiguation)
