= FTS =

FTS may refer to:

== Arts and entertainment ==
- Film and Television School, former name of the Australian Film, Television and Radio School
- Fox Television Stations, a group of American television stations
- From the Shallows, an American deathcore band
- "FTS", a 2007 song by Showtek

== Military ==
- Flight termination system
- Freedom Team Salute, a program of the United States Army

== Science and technology ==
- File transfer service
- Fujitsu Technology Solutions, a European electronics vendor
- Follow-the-sun, a sub-field of globally distributed software engineering
- Fourier-transform spectroscopy, a measurement technique whereby spectra are collected

== Transport ==
- FTS, railway code for Fatehpur Sikri railway station, in Uttar Pradesh, India
- Ferrocarriles y Transportes Suburbanos, a former Spanish railway company
- Fleet telematics system, a communications system for a fleet of vehicles
- Flight termination system, a set of interconnected activators mounted on a launch vehicle that can render a vehicle incapable of flight

== Other uses ==
- Floppy trunk syndrome, a condition affecting African bush elephants
- Flow-through share, a Canadian tax-based financing incentive
- Free the Slaves, an American human rights organization
- Friends of Tribals Society, a volunteer organization in India

== See also ==
- FT (disambiguation)
- 6:2 FTS, or 6:2-Fluorotelomersulfonic acid
