= FAM =

Fam or FAM may refer to:

== People ==
- Anthony Famiglietti (born 1978), American athlete
- Fam Ekman (born 1946), Swedish-Norwegian children's writer and illustrator
- Fam Irvoll (born 1980), Norwegian fashion designer
- Awa Fam (born 2006), Spanish basketball player
- Konstantin Fam (born 1972), Russian filmmaker

== Sport ==
=== American football ===
- Fútbol Americano de México

=== Association football ===
- Football Association of Malawi
- Football Association of Malaysia
- Football Association of Maldives

== Media ==
- Filipinas, Ahora Mismo, a Philippine radio show
- Fam (TV series), an American television sitcom that debuted in 2019
- For All Mankind (TV series), an American science fiction drama series that debuted in 2019

== Other uses ==
- Fam Islands in Indonesia
- Fam language

== Acronyms ==
- Fat acceptance movement, a social movement
- Federal Air Marshal, in the United States
- Federation of Associations of Maharashtra, an Indian trade association
- Fertility awareness method, a set of medical practices
- File Alteration Monitor, a UNIX system software
- Filipino American Museum, in New York City
- First Americans Museum, in Oklahoma City
- Fitchburg Art Museum, in Massachusetts, United States
- Fluorescein amidite, a chemical
- Foreign Affairs Manual, published by the United States Department of State
- Free Aceh Movement in Indonesia
- Free and Accepted Masons, a fraternal organisation
- Fuzzy associative matrix, a fuzzy logic term
- Mexican Air Force (Spanish: Fuerza Aérea Mexicana)

== See also ==
- Family (disambiguation)
