= FRS =

FRS may refer to:

== Government and politics ==
- Facility Registry System, a centrally managed Environmental Protection Agency database that identifies places of environmental interest in the United States
- Family Resources Survey, a survey to collect information on the incomes and circumstances of households in Great Britain
- Federal Reserve System, the central bank of the United States
- Fire and Rescue Service, an organization that provides predominantly emergency firefighting services for a specific geographic area
- Fisheries Research Services, a now-defunct agency of the Executive agencies of the Scottish Government
- Forum of Social Republicans (French: Forum des républicains sociaux), now the Christian Democratic Party, a French political party

== Science ==
- Fellow of the Royal Society, an award and fellowship granted by the Royal Society of London to individuals the society judges to have made a "substantial contribution to the improvement of natural knowledge"
- Filtered Rayleigh scattering, a diagnostic technique which measures velocity, temperature, and pressure
- Forward recoil scattering, an ion beam analysis technique in materials science to obtain elemental concentration depth profiles in thin films
- Fragment separator, an ion-optical device used to focus and separate products from the collision of relativistic ion beams with thin targets
- Framingham Risk Score, a gender-specific algorithm used to estimate the 10-year cardiovascular risk of an individual.
- Free radical scavenger, a synonym for antioxidant
- Free radical substitution, a substitution reaction involving free radicals as a reactive intermediate

== Technology ==
- Family Radio Service, an improved walkie-talkie radio system in the United States
- File Replication Service, a Microsoft Windows Server service for distributing shared files and Group Policy objects
- Frame Relay Switch, a standardized wide-area network technology that specifies the physical and data link layers of digital telecommunications channels using a packet switching methodology
- Freely redistributable software, software that anyone is free to redistribute
- Functional requirement Specification, defines a function of a system or its components
- Facial recognition system, a computer application capable of identifying or verifying a person from a digital image or a video frame from a video source
- Full-range speaker

== Transportation ==
- Ffestiniog Railway Society, a 1 ft 11 1/2 in (597 mm) narrow gauge heritage railway, located in Gwynedd, Wales
- Flandre Air, (ICAO: FRS) was a French regional airline
- Förde Reederei Seetouristik, a German shipping company
- Forsinard railway station, in northern Scotland
- Franconia–Springfield station, Amtrak station code FRS
- Full-rigged ship, a sailing vessel's sail plan with three or more masts, all of them square-rigged
- Mundo Maya International Airport, (IATA: FRS, formerly Flores International Airport) in Flores, Guatemala
- Scion FR-S, an automobile

== Other uses ==
- Fixed repeating schedule, a production scheduling methodology
- Fleet Replacement Squadron, a unit of the United States Navy and Marine Corps
- Free Record Shop, a Dutch retailer
- Frontier Regional School, in South Deerfield, Massachusetts, United States
- Saterland Frisian language, last living dialect of the East Frisian language
- East Frisian Low Saxon, Frisian-Saxon dialect of East Frisia
