= FCMM =

FCMM may refer to:

- Festival du nouveau cinéma (est. 1971; formerly, French: Festival international du nouveau cinéma et des nouveaux médias de Montréal; English: Montreal International Festival of New Cinema and New Media; FCMM), a film festival in Montreal, Quebec, Canada
- Mossendjo Airport (IATA airport code: MSX; ICAO airport code: FCMM;), Mossendjo, Niari, Republic of Congo

== See also ==
- FCM (disambiguation)
