= FDOS =

FDOS may refer to:

- Floppy Disk Operating System, a term sometimes used to describe early floppy-based disk operating systems such as CP/M
- FDOS, an operating system developed by iCOM Microperipherals (later iCOM-Pertec) in 1975, and available as an option bundled with iCOM's floppy drives available for the Intellec series of computers by Intel and the MITS Altair,
- FDOS, the part of the Basic Disk Operating System (BDOS) implementing the filesystem in Digital Research operating systems such as the CP/M and DR-DOS families
- FreeDOS, a free disk operating system
- FDOS, First Day of Service

== See also ==
- DOS (disambiguation)
- FOS (disambiguation)
