= Seiko (disambiguation) =

Seiko is a brand name for Japanese clock and watch company Seiko Group Corporation.

Seiko may also refer to:

== Organizations ==
- Seiko Group, in former days, a Japanese corporate group consisting of three independent companies including
  - Seiko Group Corporation (f/k/a K. Hattori, Hattori Seiko, and Seiko Holdings)
  - Seiko Instruments (f/k/a Daini Seikosha, Seiko Instruments & Electronics)
  - Seiko Epson (f/k/a Suwa Seikosha)
- Seiko Films, a movie outfit in the Philippines
- Seiko SA, a defunct football club in Hong Kong
- Silver Seiko Ltd., knitting machine and typewriter company (1952-2011)

== Other uses ==
- Seiko (given name), a name and a list of people with the name
- Seiko (album), a 1990 album by Seiko Matsuda

== See also ==
- Saeco, an Italian manufacturer of electrical goods
- Saeco (cycling team)
