= Discharge Monitoring Report =

A Discharge Monitoring Report (DMR) is a United States regulatory term for a periodic water pollution report prepared by industries, municipalities and other facilities discharging to surface waters. The facilities collect wastewater samples, conduct chemical and/or biological tests of the samples, and submit reports to a state agency or the United States Environmental Protection Agency (EPA). All point source dischargers to ”Waters of the U.S.” must obtain a National Pollution Discharge Elimination System (NPDES) permit from the appropriate agency, and many permittees are required to file DMRs.

== NPDES permits and DMR reporting process ==
For permits other than stormwater permits, the agencies issue effluent limitations for specific pollutants, pursuant to the Clean Water Act (CWA). The basis for these limitations depends on the type of discharging facility, the discharge characteristics and status of the specific surface water body receiving the discharge.

- National technology-based standards apply to many industries (these standards are called "effluent guidelines"), and to municipal sewage treatment plants.
- Some dischargers are subject to water quality-based effluent limitations, derived from water quality standards for the adjacent water body.
- For pollutants not covered by the above circumstances, the agency may set technology-based limitations based on its "best professional judgment" (BPJ).

Most NPDES permits require facilities to submit monthly DMRs, but some permits require seasonal or semi-annual reporting. Facilities may collect and analyze samples more frequently, e.g. weekly, and summarize the results for the prescribed reporting period. Permits typically require reporting of wastewater flow and the results of one or more chemical tests corresponding to the effluent limitations. Typical monitoring parameters include pH, biochemical oxygen demand (BOD), total suspended solids (TSS), nutrients (nitrates and phosphorus), various toxic pollutants, temperature, etc. Some permits also require aquatic biomonitoring of the receiving waterbody.

== Accessing DMR data ==
The CWA defines DMR data as publicly available information (except for data that would reveal trade secrets). EPA houses DMR data in its Integrated Compliance Information System (ICIS). The NPDES e-reporting Tool Discharge Monitoring Report (NetDMR) is an EPA web-based tool that allows NPDES permittees to electronically sign and submit their discharge monitoring reports to EPA via a secure internet connection (NetDMR is the new tool that replaced the previous Permit Compliance System (PCS)). Information from ICIS database is available through EPA's "Envirofacts" website and Enforcement and Compliance History Online (ECHO). The Agency provides a DMR "Pollutant Loading Tool" to help users determine who is discharging, what pollutants they are discharging and how much, and where they are discharging. EPA also allows users to search its Facility Registry System, to compare a facility's compliance with air, water and solid waste permits and regulations.

== See also ==
- Water quality
- Category:Water quality indicators
- Total maximum daily load
