= FWT =

FWT may refer to:

- Fair wear and tear, in government and aviation industries
- Fast Walsh–Hadamard transform, a mathematical algorithm
- Fast wavelet transform, a mathematical algorithm
- First Welfare Theorem, a theorem of welfare economics
- Fixed wireless terminal, another name for a wireless local loop
- The Formation World Tour, a concert tour by Beyoncé
- Freeride World Tour, an annual freeriding competition
- Freies Werkstatt Theater, in Cologne, Germany
- the station code for Waterloo railway station, Belgium
