= FFE =

FFE may refer to:

== Organisations ==
- Fédération Française des Éclaireuses, a French girl guiding movement
- FFE Transportation, an American transport company
- FIFA Forward Enterprise, a proposed commercial subsidiary of the International Federation of Football
- Foundation For Excellence, a non-profit organization which supports students in India
- French Chess Federation (French: Fédération Française des Echecs)
- French Fencing Federation (French: Fédération Française d'Escrime)

== Publications ==
- Fakes Forgeries Experts, a philatelic journal
- Foras Feasa ar Éirinn, a narrative history of Ireland by Geoffrey Keating

== Other uses ==
- Fire for effect, a military doctrine
- Fire-From-Enclosure, M72A28 Light Anti-Tank (AT) Weapon (LAW) variant
- Ford Focus Electric, an electric car
- Free-flow electrophoresis, a high-voltage electrophoretic separation technique
- Fremantle railway station, Australia, station code FFE
- Frontier: First Encounters, a video game
- Fukuoka Futures Exchange in Japan
- Furniture, fixtures and equipment (accounting)
