= Fob =

Fob or FOB may refer to:

== Entertainment ==
- FOB (play), a 1981 play by David Henry Hwang
- Fall Out Boy, an American rock band

== Fashion and technology ==
- Fob pocket
- Key fob
- USB fob
- Watch fob

== Medicine ==
- Fecal occult blood
- Follow-on biologics

== Military ==
- Forward operating base
- Fractional Orbital Bombardment

== Other uses ==
- Federation of Revolutionary Syndicalist Organizations of Brazil
- FOB (shipping) or Free on Board
- Federal Office Building (disambiguation)
- Fixed odds betting terminal
- Fob James (born 1934), former governor of Alabama
- Fresh off the boat
