= FSB =

FSB may refer to:

== Organizations ==
=== Banking and finance ===
- Federal savings bank, a class of bank in the US
- Federation of Small Businesses, a British lobbying group
- Financial Services Board (South Africa), a financial regulatory authority
- Financial Stability Board, an international group of financial authorities
- First Somali Bank, a bank headquartered in Mogadishu, Somalia
- FöreningsSparbanken, former name of the retail banking group Swedbank

=== Schools ===
- Farmer School of Business, at Miami University, Ohio, US
- Friends School of Baltimore, a Quaker institution in Baltimore, US
- Fuqua School of Business, at Duke University, North Carolina, US

=== Other organizations ===
- Federal Security Service (Russian: Federal'naya Sluzhba Bezopasnosti), the principal security agency of the Russian Federation
- Trade Union Social Citizens List (Danish: Faglig Social Borgerliste), a Danish political group
- Bolivian Socialist Falange (Spanish: Falange Socialista Boliviana), a Bolivian political party

== Military ==
- Fire support base, a temporary military encampment
- Forward support battalion, a former unit of the US Army

== Science and technology ==
- Brinjal fruit and shoot borer (Leucinodes orbonalis), a moth species
- Fast syndrome-based hash, cryptographic hash functions
- Front-side bus, a computer communication interface

== Other uses ==
- FSB (band), a Bulgarian band
- Fellow of the Society of Biology, UK
- Fishbourne railway station (station code), in England
- Fortune Small Business, a defunct magazine
