= FDR (disambiguation) =

FDR, or Franklin Delano Roosevelt (1882–1945), was the 32nd president of the United States from 1933 to 1945.

FDR may also refer to:

== Entertainment ==
- FDR (video game), a 1996 computer game
- Fan Death Records, an American record label
- Franklin Delano Romanowski, a character from the television show Seinfeld
- Freedomain Radio, a podcast

== Politics ==
- Foundation for Democratic Reforms, an Indian think tank
- Frente Democrático Revolucionario (Revolutionary Democratic Front), a political organization in El Salvador
- Front Demokrasi Rakjat (People's Democratic Front (Indonesia)), a defunct political party in Indonesia
- Front pour la démocratie et la république (Front for Democracy and the Republic), a political coalition in Mali
- Finnish Democratic Republic, Soviet puppet state in Finland during the Winter War (1939–1940)

== Technology ==
- False discovery rate, in statistics
- FDR (software), for checking formal models
- Firearm discharge residue, or gunshot residue
- Flight data recorder of an aircraft
- A signaling rate used in InfiniBand
- Electrical frequency disturbance recorder, an FNET sensor
- Full depth recycling, repaving by recycling material

== Other uses ==
- FDR Drive, a road in New York City
- FDR, stage name of Felix McTeigue, American musician
- Fluid Dynamics Research, a scholarly journal
- Fonciere des Regions, a French holding company
- Frederick Regional Airport, United States (IATA code: FDR)

== See also ==
- Franklin Delano Roosevelt Jr., or FDR Jr. (1914–1988), American politician, son of Franklin Delano Roosevelt
- Franklin Delano Roosevelt III, or FDR III (born 1938), American economist, son of Franklin Delano Roosevelt Jr.
