= FSK =

FSK may refer to:

- FSK (band), a German band
- FSK Satellite, Italian hip-hop ensemble
- Federal Counterintelligence Service, (Russian Федера́льная Слу́жба Контрразве́дки; Federalnaya Sluzhba Kontrrazvedki) of Russia
- Fiskerton railway station, in England
- Forskolin, a diterpene
- Forsvarets Spesialkommando, a Norwegian special forces unit
- Fort Scott Municipal Airport, in Kansas, United States
- Francis Scott Key Bridge (disambiguation)
- Francis Scott Key High School, in Union Bridge, Maryland, United States
- Freiwillige Selbstkontrolle der Filmwirtschaft, a German movie rating organization
- Frequency-shift keying
- Friends School Kamusinga, in Kenya
- Kosovo Security Force, (Albanian: Forca e Sigurisë së Kosovës)
