= FKA =

FKA or fka may refer to:

- Fazilka Junction railway station, in Punjab, India
- Federal Kidnapping Act, in the United States
- Fender Katsalidis Architects, an Australian architectural firm
- Fillmore County Airport, in Minnesota, United States
- Karrakatta railway station, in Perth, Australia
- FKA Twigs (born 1988), an English singer
- Roscosmos State Corporation, the governmental body responsible for the space science program of Russia
- Formerly known as, a former name
