= FME =

FME may refer to:

== Entertainment ==
- Film and Music Entertainment, a British film production company
- Finnish Metal Expo, a music festival

== Technology ==
- FME connector, a type of coaxial cable connector
- FME (software), a spatial data integration and conversion application
- Facegenics Midfacial Expander, a palatal expander
- Fairbanks Morse Engine, engine manufacturing subsidiary of EnPro Industries
- Fourier–Motzkin elimination, a mathematical technique
- Fujitsu Microelectronics Europe GmbH, former name of Fujitsu Semiconductor Europe GmbH

== Other uses ==
- Federación Mexicana de Esgrima, the Mexican Fencing Federation
- Fjármálaeftirlitið (Financial Supervisory Authority (Iceland), an Icelandic government agency
- Force medical examiner, any doctor employed by police in the United Kingdom as an expert in a law enforcement matter
- Forest Movement Europe, an environmental organization
- Formal Methods Europe, an NGO for encouraging formal methods in computer hardware and software development
- Free-market environmentalism, a political philosophy
- FME, IATA code for Tipton Airport, in Maryland, United States
