= FWF =

FWF may refer to:

- Austrian Science Fund (German: Fonds zur Förderung der wissenschaftlichen Forschung)
- Fair Wear Foundation, a European trade organization
- Five Way Friday, an American band
- Frank Waters Foundation, an American arts organization
- Free World Forces, a military coalition during the Vietnam War
