= FEF =

FEF or Fef may refer to:

- Futsal European Federation
- Fef, West Papua, the capital of Tambrauw Regency, West Papua, Western New Guinea
- Ecuadorian Football Federation (Spanish: Federación Ecuatoriana de Futbol)
- FedExField, a stadium in Landover, Maryland, United States
- Fire Emblem Fates, a video game
- Forced expiratory flow
- Frontal eye fields
- Frontier Education Foundation, in Pakistan
- Fusion Energy Foundation, a defunct American think tank
- Union Pacific FEF series, a steam locomotive
- First European Farmers
- Front End Friday
