= Grethe Irvoll =

Norwegian feminist and politician

Grethe Mary Irvoll (born 1939) is a Norwegian feminist and politician for the Labour Party.

In Norwegian women's rights history, she is known for her proposal at the Labour Party national convention in 1969, where Irvoll represented the local party branch at Ammerud, Oslo. Her proposal that "The Labour Party shall turn women's right to choose abortion into law" was passed by the national convention. Nine years later, the law was passed by Parliament. From 1987 she worked as information director in the Norwegian Trekking Association. She also edited the Trekking Association's yearbook.

Irvoll is a grandmother of Fam Irvoll.
