= Fudd (disambiguation) =

Elmer Fudd is a Warner Brothers cartoon character.

Fudd, FUDD or Fudds may also refer to:

- Fear, uncertainty, doubt, and despair (FUDD)
- A fuddy-duddy or fudd
- Azzi Fudd (born 2002), U.S. basketball player
- Fudd beer, a fictional beer found in The Simpsons, a competitor to Duff beer
- Fuddruckers (Fudds), U.S. fast-casual restaurant chain
- Northrop Grumman E-2 Hawkeye (Super Fudd), U.S. Navy aerial radar plane
- Grumman E-1 Tracer (Willy Fudd), U.S. Navy aerial radar plane

== See also ==
- Fud (disambiguation)
