= FQ =

FQ, Fq or fq may refer to:

- Fenqing, a Chinese term for "angry youth"
- Financial Quotient, a measure of financial ability
- Fluoroquinolone, an antibiotic
- Football Queensland, an Australian sports organisation
- Baker Island (FIPS PUB 10-4 territory code FQ), an unincorporated and unorganized territory of the U.S.
- Thomas Cook Airlines Belgium (former IATA code FQ), a Belgian leisure airline
- 3-(2-Furoyl)quinoline-2-carboxaldehyde, a fluorogenic amine labeling dye
