= FARP =

FARP may refer to:

- Revolutionary Armed Forces of the People, originally the armed wing of the African Party for the Independence of Guinea and Cape Verde during the struggle against Portuguese rule; the national armed forces of Guinea-Bissau since 1973
- Fantasy Art Resource Project, a collection of art and writing tutorials hosted by Elfwood
- Forward arming and refuelling point (or forward area refueling/rearming point), a NATO/US term for an area designated for the re-arming and re-fueling of aircraft
- Armed Forces of Popular Resistance, a Puerto Rican nationalist paramilitary group
- Field Artillery Rationalisation Plan, a procurement and development plan to standardise the gun artillery arsenal of the Indian Army.
