= Anite =

Company in Fleet, United Kingdom

Anite plc
- Type: Limited
- Industry: Software
- Founded: 1973; 53 years ago
- Headquarters: Fleet, Hampshire
- Key people: Mike Bonin, (Managing Director, Device & Infrastructure Testing); Petri Toljamo, (Managing Director, Network Testing)
- Revenue: £109.2 million (2014)
- Operating income: £9.3 million (2014)
- Net income: £12.3 million (2014)
- Number of employees: circa 500
- Parent: Keysight Technologies
- Website: www.anite.com

Anite is a supplier of test and measurement software to the international Wireless market. It provides testing, measurement, optimisation and analytics systems based on its specialist sector knowledge and its proprietary software and hardware products. Customers include major manufacturers of mobile devices, chipsets and network equipment, mobile network operators, regulatory authorities, and independent test houses.

== History ==
The company was founded in 1973 as Cray Electronics and in October 1996 it changed its name to Anite Group plc. In 2006 it acquired Nemo, a network testing business. In October 2007 it changed its name to Anite plc. In April 2015, Anite acquired Setcom Wireless Products GmbH.

After Anite started struggling in the face of cancellation of orders from Blackberry, Nokia and Motorola, Anite received a takeover offer from US electronics test and measurement company, Keysight Technologies in a deal worth £388 million in June 2015. The acquisition was completed in August 2015.

== Operations ==
The company has two sides to its business:

- Device & Infrastructure Testing and Network Testing for the wireless market

== See also ==
- Future Office System
