= FWC =

FWC may refer to:

- Fairfield Municipal Airport (Illinois), in the United States
- Fair Work Commission, in Australia
- Far West Capital, an American financial services company
- FIFA World Cup, an international football (soccer) competition held every four years
- FIFI Wild Cup, an international football tournament
- Florida Fish and Wildlife Conservation Commission, an agency of the state government of Florida, United States
- Fortnite World Cup, a Fortnite video game competition
- Fort Worth Christian School, in North Richland Hills, Texas, United States
- Foster Wheeler Corporation, a Swiss engineering and construction conglomerate
- Frail Words Collapse, an album by American metalcore band As I Lay Dying
- Free Wesleyan Church, in Tonga
- Fujian White Crane, a Chinese martial art
- Future Worlds Center, a Cypriot humanitarian organization
- Female Water Closet, an abbreviation for a flush toilet
- Full well capacity, the maximum number of photoelectrons a pixel in an image sensor can hold
- Fair Work Center, an American labor rights group
