= FRR =

FRR may refer to:

== Organizations ==
=== Sport ===
- Forza Rossa Racing, a Romanian racing team
- Furniture Row Racing, an American racing team
- Romanian Rugby Federation (Romanian: Federația Română de Rugby)

=== Other organizations ===
- Falls Road Railroad, in New York, United States
- Federația Română de Radioamatorism, an amateur radio organization in Romania
- Fresh Air (airline), a Nigerian airline
- Pensions Reserve Fund (France) (French: Fonds de Réserve pour les Retraites)

== Other uses ==
- Flight Readiness Review, in the US military acquisition life cycle
- Forgiveness Rock Record, an album by Canadian indie rock band Broken Social Scene
- Free Radical Research, a peer-reviewed academic journal
- Front Royal–Warren County Airport, in Virginia, United States
- FRRouting, a network routing software suite
- North Frisian language (ISO 639 language code frr)
- Pays de la Loire, France
