= Faith Baptist School =

Faith Baptist School may refer to any of these schools in the United States:

- Faith Baptist School (California), a private school for kindergarten through 12th grade in Canoga Park
- Faith Baptist School (Colorado), a high school in Longmont, Boulder County
- Faith Baptist School (Michigan), a private school for kindergarten through 12th grade
- Faith Baptist School (Virginia), a high school in Spotsylvania County
- Faith Baptist School (Salisbury, Maryland), a private school for kindergarten through 12th grade

== See also ==
- Faith Baptist Bible College and Theological Seminary, a private undergraduate and graduate institution located in Ankeny, Iowa
- Faith Baptist College and Seminary, a private Baptist-oriented college in Anderson, South Carolina, that closed in 1998
