= Lees-Haley Fake Bad Scale =

The Lees-Haley Fake Bad Scale (FBS) or MMPI Symptom Validity Scale is a set of 43 items in the Minnesota Multiphasic Personality Inventory (MMPI), selected by Paul R. Lees-Haley in 1991 to detect malingering for the forensic evaluation of personal injury claimants. It was endorsed by the MMPI publishers in 2006 and incorporated into the official scoring keys. A 2008 Wall Street Journal article noted that a few psychologists argued that it was controversial because they felt that some individuals with legitimate injuries would be categorized as faking bad.

== History ==
The items on the FBS were selected by Lees-Haley on the basis of frequency differences between a sample of individuals known to be malingering and individuals judged to have legitimate complaints and his personal observations of malingerers.

The FBS is a generally accepted validity test. For example, in their survey of validity test use, Sharland and Gfeller (2007) found that the FBS was the third most widely used validity test by neuropsychologists. In a more recent study, Martin, Schroeder, and Odland (2015) found in a survey of general practitioners that the FBS was the most widely used symptom validity test (SVT) for the MMPI-2 and one of the two most widely used for the MMPI-2-RF.

== Validity ==
The largest meta-analysis of the FBS compared 1,615 judged over-reporters to 2,049 normal patients and found an effect size of 0.94. The authors concluded that “the preponderance of the current literature supports the use of FBS within forensic settings” (p. 55).

An updated meta-analysis of data from 5,341 subjects published in 2010 further confirmed findings of the first. The authors conclude, “Practitioners who rely on FBS can be assured that the now extensive literature strongly supports application of FBS in forensic neuropsychology practice” (p. 717).

== See also ==
- Validity scale
