= Sn-glycerol-3-phosphate 2-alpha-galactosyltransferase =

Class of enzymes

sn-glycerol-3-phosphate 2-alpha-galactosyltransferase

Identifiers
- EC no.: 2.4.1.137
- CAS no.: 80747-34-8

Databases
- IntEnz: IntEnz view
- BRENDA: BRENDA entry
- ExPASy: NiceZyme view
- KEGG: KEGG entry
- MetaCyc: metabolic pathway
- PRIAM: profile
- PDB structures: RCSB PDB PDBe PDBsum
- Gene Ontology: AmiGO / QuickGO
Search
- PMC: articles
- PubMed: articles
- NCBI: proteins

In enzymology, a sn-glycerol-3-phosphate 2-alpha-galactosyltransferase (EC 2.4.1.137) is an enzyme that catalyzes the chemical reaction

UDP-galactose + sn-glycerol 3-phosphate $\rightleftharpoons$ UDP + 2-(alpha-D-galactosyl)-sn-glycerol 3-phosphate

Thus, the two substrates of this enzyme are UDP-galactose and sn-glycerol 3-phosphate, whereas its two products are UDP and 2-(alpha-D-galactosyl)-sn-glycerol 3-phosphate.

This enzyme belongs to the family of glycosyltransferases, specifically the hexosyltransferases. The systematic name of this enzyme class is UDP-galactose:sn-glycerol-3-phosphate 2-alpha-D-galactosyltransferase. Other names in common use include floridoside-phosphate synthase, UDP-galactose:sn-glycerol-3-phosphate-2-D-galactosyl transferase, FPS, UDP-galactose, sn-3-glycerol phosphate:1->2' galactosyltransferase, floridoside phosphate synthetase, and floridoside phosphate synthase.
