= FH =

FH, Fh, or fh may refer to:

== Businesses and institutions ==
- Danish Trade Union Confederation (Danish: Fagbevægelsens Hovedorganisation)
- Faculty of Humanities (The Hong Kong Polytechnic University)
- Fachhochschule, in German, a college of higher education
- Federation of the Swiss Watch Industry FH
- Futura International Airways (IATA code)

== Science and technology ==
=== Biology and medicine ===
- Familial hypercholesterolemia, a genetic disorder
- Factor H, a complement control protein
- Family history
- FH, a gene that encodes the enzyme fumarase

=== Chemistry ===
- Ferrihydrite (Fh), a widespread hydrous ferric oxyhydroxide mineral

=== Other uses in science and technology ===
- McDonnell FH Phantom, the U.S. Navy's first jet-powered fighter aircraft
- Falcon Heavy, Spacex's heavy lift reusable rocket

== Sport ==
- Fimleikafélag Hafnarfjarðar, Icelandic football club

== Other uses ==
- fh (digraph); appears in Irish and some other languages
- Volvo FH, a range of trucks
