= Faith Baptist School (Michigan) =

School in Davison, Michigan, United States

Location
- 7306 East Atherton Road; Davison, Michigan 48423; USA; 42°59′18.6″N 83°33′46.3″W

Information
- Type: Private Christian
- Religious affiliation: Baptist
- Established: 1978
- Administrator: Damien Ahrens
- Principal: Michael Cox, High School Principal
- Grades: PreK-12
- Gender: Coeducational
- Colors: Black, Gold, White
- Sports: Basketball, Baseball, Wrestling, Soccer, Volleyball, Cheerleading
- Mascot: Eagle
- Team name: Eagles
- Newspaper: The Eagle Call
- Website: http://www.fbsdavison.net/

Faith Baptist School is a private, evangelical Baptist Christian school located in Davison, Michigan, United States. It houses grades kindergarten through 12.
