= FCW (disambiguation) =

FCW may refer to:

== Professional wrestling ==
- Championship Wrestling from Florida, also referred to as Florida Championship Wrestling, operating from 1949 until 1987
- Florida Championship Wrestling, operating from 2007 until 2012
  - FCW (TV series), the television show for Florida Championship Wrestling

== Football clubs ==
- FC Wacker Innsbruck (2002), in Innsbruck, Austria
- FC Wil, in Wil, St. Gallen, Switzerland
- FC Winterthur, in Winterthur, Switzerland
- FC Wohlen, in Wohlen, Aargau, Switzerland

== Other uses ==
- City West railway station's station code, in Perth, Western Australia
- Falconcity of Wonders, a Dubai-based real estate project
- Federal Computer Week, an American technology magazine
- Finnish Civil War, a conflict in 1918
- Forward collision warning, an automobile safety system
- First Commonwealth, a subsidiary of The Guardian Life Insurance Company of America
