= FDR (video game) =

1996 video game

- Developer: Corbis
- Platform: PC
- Release: 1996

FDR is a 1996 interactive CD-ROM game developed by Corbis. The title allows players to explore the life and times of Franklin D. Roosevelt through imagery, documents, video, a timeline, and other multimedia.

== Development ==
FDR was scheduled for release in late 1996. The game's distribution strategy involved being pushed to museum stores and other specialty outlets. The game is one of six created by Corbis including Leonardo da Vinci and A Passion for Art: Renoir, Cezanne, Matisse, and Dr. Barnes. A companion website at http://www.corbis.com/fdr/ was also released. The developers publicised the game in an interview in Time magazine. The company paid their photographers a minimum royalty of $45 per image.

== Content ==
The game is divided into 11 chapters: Nothing to Fear; The First Ten Days; Legacies of the New Deal; The Changing Face of America; A President in Isolation; The Inner Circle; Seasons of Dilemma; Pearl Harbor; Hour by Hour; A Nation at War; and To Yalta and Back.

== Critical reception ==
ComputerLife praised the game's interface, sense of humor, and renderings. The Wall Street Journal praised the title for being "visually arresting". The San Francisco Chronicle deemed it "ambitious and gorgeously executed".
