= The Fid =

The Fid (68°39′S 65°58′W) is a sharp peak rising to 1,640 metres (5,380 ft) at the eastern side of the mouth of Cole Glacier in southern Graham Land, Antarctica. The peak was photographed from the air by the United States Antarctic Service on 28 September 1940 and was surveyed by the Falkland Islands Dependencies Survey in December 1958. The name, bestowed by the UK Antarctic Place-Names Committee, derives from its shape, which suggests the conical wooden pin used in splicing, known as a fid.
