= FISA (disambiguation) =

FISA is the Foreign Intelligence Surveillance Act, a 1978 United States federal law.

FISA may also refer to:

== Law ==
- Foreign Intelligence Surveillance Act of 1978 Amendments Act of 2008 (FISA Amendments Act of 2008), that amended the US law
- Fighting Internet and Wireless Spam Act (Bill C-28), Canadian anti-spam legislation

== Organisations ==
- Fédération Internationale des Sociétés Aérophilatéliques or International Federation of Aerophilatelic Societies
- Fédération Internationale des Sociétés d'Aviron or the International Federation of Rowing Associations, the governing body for international rowing
- Fédération Internationale du Sport Automobile, historically a subsidiary body of the FIA
- Federation of Irish Scout Associations, a member of the World Organisation of the Scout Movement
- Federation of Indian Student Associations in Australia, an umbrella body of Indian Students Associations in Australia
