= FSV =

FSV may refer to:

- Fidelity Special Values, a British investment trust
- File System Visualizer, a file manager for Linux and other Unix-like operating systems
- Fort St. Vrain Generating Station, in Colorado, United States
- M1131 fire support vehicle
