= FFE Transportation =

American transportation company

FFE Transportation Services, Inc.
- Type: Private
- Traded as: Nasdaq: FFEX
- Industry: Transportation
- Founded: 1943; 83 years ago
- Headquarters: Lancaster, Texas, U.S.
- Area served: United States
- Key people: James M. Richards Jr. (president and CEO); Steve Stedman (CFO); Vincent Barnett (vice president of operations)
- Services: Temperature-controlled shipping
- Website: www.ffeinc.com

FFE Transportation Services, Inc. is an American temperature-controlled transportation company that is the primary operating subsidiary of Frozen Food Express Services, Inc. Founded in 1943, the company is headquartered in Lancaster, Texas. It provides temperature controlled transportation services for over-the-road transportation.

FFE has terminals located throughout the United States in Georgia, Illinois, Florida, Oregon, Texas, Missouri, California, Utah, Colorado, New Jersey, North Carolina, Ohio and Connecticut.

Frozen Food Express Industries, Inc. went public in 1971. In 2013, the company returned to private ownership after being acquired by Thomas and James Duff of Columbia, Mississippi.
