= Five Way Friday =

- Origin: Greenville, South Carolina; Columbia, Charleston, South Carolina
- Genres: Rock
- Years active: 1997–present
- Labels: Mile Marker Records; Redeye Label

Five Way Friday is a pop-rock band based out of Greenville and Columbia, South Carolina. They have been compared to Train and Matchbox 20.

== History ==
The band formed in 1997, playing gigs in Greenville, Charleston and Columbia, South Carolina, and releasing a full-length (Moon Driven World) and two EPs over the course of the next three years. In 2000, Run Like This reached #4 on Billboard's Top Internet Albums chart. Subsequently, the band toured with such bands as Vertical Horizon and Cowboy Mouth, and had several songs including "Homecoming" and "Everyone" featured in episodes of Dawson's Creek. Though the band nearly broke up after the making of Run Like This, when founding guitarist Michael Helmly departed, in 2003 a full-length entitled Wrecked was released, produced by fellow South Carolinian Mark Bryan of Hootie & the Blowfish.

While most band members now have full-time jobs away from music, the band continues to play a limited tour schedule throughout South Carolina. All Five Way Friday albums are available for download at iTunes. In 2009 Five Way Friday teamed up with the Share Our Suzy (SOS) Foundation, an organization that provides financial assistance to cancer patients from diagnosis to remission, and began the Back to Her Campaign. FWF is donating a percentage of every download of its song Back to Her from iTunes to the SOS Foundation. Official Webpage

Guitarist Mac Leaphart is now touring the Southeast with his band, Mac Leaphart and My Ragged Company. Mac's debut solo album Line Rope, Etc. was chosen as one of the best albums of 2008 by the Charleston City Paper. Official Webpage

== Members ==
- Randy Helmly - vocals
- Michael Helmly - guitar/vocals
- Mac Leaphart - guitar/vocals
- Gibbs Leaphart - bass
- Joe Good - drums
- Rivers Pearce - guitar/piano
- Michael McWhorter - hammond organ/piano

== Discography ==
- Twice This Year (Self-released in 1997 under band's initial moniker Exit 199)
- Five Way Friday (Demo) (1997)
- Moon Driven World (Mile Marker Records, 1998)
- Run Like This (Mile Marker, 2000)
- Wrecked (Redeye Label, 2003)
