= FGR =

FGR or fgr may refer to:

== Government and politics ==
- Attorney General of Mexico (Spanish: Fiscalía General de la República)
- Federation of the Republican Left (French: Fédération de la gauche républicaine), a French coalition of parties

== Medicine ==
- FGR (gene)
- Fetal growth restriction

== Other uses ==
- Euronext ticker for Eiffage, a French construction company founded in 1992
- Postal code for Fgura, Malta
- ISO 639-3 code for the Fongoro language (or Gele), spoken in Chad
- Forest Green Rovers F.C., an English football club founded in 1889
