= Financial quotient =

Financial Quotient (FQ), sometimes also referred as financial intelligence (FI), financial intelligence quotient (FiQ) or financial IQ, is the ability to obtain and manage one's wealth by understanding how money works. Like emotional quotient (EQ), FQ derived its name from IQ (intelligence quotient).

== Measurement ==
A widely adopted measurement of FQ is based on a six-category model developed by Yu and Zhang. The six categories are,

- Spending
- Credit and debt
- Career and income
- Investing
- Financial planning
- Risk and protection

The concept of this test is based on the following understanding:

- People's financial well beings are the consequences of large and small financial decisions.
- A more comprehensive understanding will help improve financial behaviors given the same other conditions such as the background information, personal finance and intelligence level, etc.
- A higher FQ score can be obtained through education.

A comprehensive FQ test includes all six categories while each category further contains multiple subjects. Test scores are obtained from each category and compiled to show the strength and weakness on each of them. A hexagon distribution of the category scores is used to provide a visualization of the FQ score.

Although the term FQ is named after IQ, the FQ score is different from an IQ score, which uses a normal distribution. On the other hand, the FQ score is an indicator of how confident one can expect when the person is making a financial decision. It is based on the person's understanding of how the money works and how to conserve and grow one's wealth with a calculated risk.

== Application ==
The FQ score has been used to analyze people's behavior in the financial world, such as using credit cards, purchasing cars and houses, etc. It is also used to measure and improve financial literacy education or even social justice throughout the world.
