= FEB =

FEB, FeB, Feb or feb may refer to:

- February, as an abbreviation for the second month of the year in the Gregorian calendar
- Brazilian Expeditionary Force (Portuguese: Força Expedicionária Brasileira)
- Federal Executive Boards, in the US
- Federation of Enterprises in Belgium
- Spanish Basketball Federation (Spanish: Federación Española de Baloncesto)
- Federatie Eredivisie Basketball, which runs the Dutch Basketball League
- FeB, chemical formula for iron boride
- FEB, advertising agency from Poland (Polish: Fabryka e-biznesu)
