= For What It's Worth (disambiguation) =

"For What It's Worth" is a 1966 Stephen Stills / Buffalo Springfield song.

For What It's Worth may also refer to:

== Music ==
- For What It's Worth (EP), by Ensign
- For What It's Worth (album), by Stick to Your Guns
- "For What It's Worth" (The Cardigans song)
- "For What It's Worth" (Liam Gallagher song)
- "For What It's Worth" (Placebo song)
- "For What It's Worth" (Stevie Nicks song)
- "For What It's Worth", a song by Breland from Cross Country
- "For What It's Worth", a song by Jay Rock from Redemption

== Other uses ==
- For What It's Worth (novel), by Janet Tashjian
- For What It's Worth, a stand-up comedy special by Dave Chappelle
- For What It's Worth (game show), a 2016 BBC daytime antiques game show
- Paul Harvey's For What It's Worth, a book compiling radio segments by Paul Harvey
