= Facility Registry System =

The Facility Registry System (FRS) is a centrally managed Environmental Protection Agency (EPA) database that identifies facilities, sites or places of environmental interest in the United States.

== Overview ==
FRS creates facility identification records through verification and management procedures that incorporate information from EPA's program-specific national data systems, state master facility records, data collected from the agency's Central Data Exchange registrations and data management personnel. The FRS provides Internet access to a single integrated source of comprehensive environmental regulatory and compliance information about facilities, sites or places. This includes the national air and water pollution programs, solid and hazardous waste handling, and enforcement activities.

The FRS responds to the increasing demand for access to information and the public need for one source of comprehensive environmental information about a given place. Under the major U.S. environmental statutes—the Clean Air Act, Clean Water Act, Resource Conservation and Recovery Act, etc.--there was no mandate for the individual EPA programs to pool their data to create complete pictures of a facility's environmental footprint. FRS accomplishes this by matching the various program system records according to address matches into a single master record.

In 1995, the Risk Management Plans were compiled with the Toxics Release Inventory Data to create the first version of the Facility Registry System. Since that time, 45 states and 25 programs have been integrated into the FRS.

A new Organizational Query is offered that brings together all facilities under that Organization in one simple query result.

FRS data files can also be accessed at the data.gov website.

== FRS Business Rules ==
The FRS retrieves key identifiers from program offices. Information includes facility name, address, city, etc. The FRS also ingests any geographic information, such as latitude and longitude. The program system id number is also retrieved and placed in the FRS database. FRS also stores the SIC and NAICS codes for facilities that are collected by the various program and state collections. FRS now offers a complete query result from either a SIC value or NAICS value. FRS further contains the Corporation Name which owns or operates the facility. The information from the various programs are then parsed to remove abbreviations and colloquialisms in order to be compared using a conservative matching algorithm. Matched ids are clustered under a single FRS id, while unmatched ids are given individual ids. Geographic information is stored in a separate Location Reference Table. FRS ids that lack a latitude and longitude are sent through EPA's geocoding process, which uses rooftop and map interpolation methods to derive a latitude and longitude with the appropriate method, accuracy and description (MAD) codes.

== Accessing the FRS ==
The FRS is available through an EPA website called the "Envirofacts Data Warehouse." Facilities can be queried in tabular format, with active links to program databases that contain regulatory data, such as the Discharge Monitoring Report used in the water pollution permit program. FRS, through the Envirofacts site, offers a geospatial download service in various GIS file formats to allow greater access to the facility data.

== Criticisms of the FRS ==
The role the FRS plays in EPA is to provide an accurate, authoritative facility record. The European model of environmental regulation is for facilities to be assigned a number when the plant created, and all permits are linked to that number. The U.S. environmental regulatory system is based on multiple environmental laws, with somewhat varying scope and definitions. The separate regulatory system established under each law contributes its separate set of permit information to a central data system, which has to match the facility records based on the business rules outlined above. Further complicating the issue, many programs use self-reported information, which encourages gaming the system to reduce the apparent environmental impact of a production facility. One other structural problem is that many environmental programs are delegated to the states, which further complicates facility interaction at the federal level. These structural problems prevent EPA from having as complete a picture of American pollution as its European counterparts.

Another criticism of the FRS is the limited accuracy of the latitude and longitude data. While FRS has taken many new actions to improve locational values, with 2.1 million facilities which now have a latitude and longitude, it is hard to place them accurately on web maps which are not totally compatible either, such as MS-Bing and Google's Google Earth.
