= FY =

Fy or FY may refer to:

== Aerospace ==
- Convair XFY Pogo, an experimental aircraft
- Fengyun, a series of Chinese weather satellites
- Firefly (airline), Malaysia (IATA code: FY)

== Places ==
- FY postcode area, England
- North Macedonia (NATO country code:FY)
- Fengyang, China

== Science ==
- Yield strength, of a material
- Duffy antigen system (International Society for Blood Transfusion code: FY), a classification of human blood groups
- Feynmanium, or untriseptium

== Other uses ==
- Fushigi Yûgi, a manga (1991–1996)
- Fiscal year, in business
- West Frisian language, spoken in the Netherlands (ISO 639-1: fy)
