= Freies Werkstatt Theater =

Coordinates: 50.91929°N 6.95910°E

Freies Werkstatt-Theater is a theatre in Cologne, North Rhine-Westphalia, Germany. It is managed as a public utility and sponsored by the City of Cologne and the state of North Rhine-Westphalia. It was founded in Cologne in 1977 as part of the nationwide pilot project 'Artists and Students'. Since 1995 it has been located in a redesigned and refurbished listed building in the south of the city. Its five floors include two venues, two foyers, rehearsal, office, and workshop space

From its founding in 1979, as the first theatre in Germany to have a third-age company, it has developed plays whose themes reflect the lives and histories of the people involved, their entry into retirement, and life as older people today.

The theater is directed by Dieter Scholz, co-founder, and Ingrid Berzau Honour. Dieter Scholz was awarded the Order of Merit (Bundesverdienstkreuz) in 1995 and in 2007 the Cologne Theatre Prize, and Berzau also received of the FWT also the Order of Merit in 2010 for her commitment as artistic director.

The theatre has become known specially for its unconventionally staged arrangements and dramatizations of literary styles and classics. and in 1990 for its special concept, was the first theatre to receive the Independent Theatre Award of North Rhine Westphalia.

== Awards ==
- Cologne Theater Prize 2008: for the dramatisation of Das Wüten der ganzen Welt
- First prize: The Otto-Mühlschlegel-Award "Zukunft Alter" 2008 from the Robert Bosch Foundation
- In December 2007 Dieter Scholz received the Cologne Award of Honour
- 2007 The Robert Jungk Prize for the Project of the Future
- 1999 prize for nationwide engagement for seniors (Länderübergreifendes Engagement für Senioren)
- 1992 North Rhine Westphalia State Promotion Prize for Das große Heft
- 1990 North Rhine Westphalia State Promotion Prize for Global Artistic Concept
- 1990 EXPRESS-Public prize

== Nominations ==
A total of 19 nominations for the Cologne Theatre Prize including:

- 2008 for Das Wüten der ganzen Welt First dramatisation of the novel by Maarten ’t Hart by Johannes Kaetzler and produced by Johannes Kaetzler
- 2007 for Woyzeck³, 3 pieces by Georg Büchner, compiled by Gerhard Seidel, Kay Link, produced by Kay Link
- 2006 for Irrungen, Wirrungen, stage production by Gerhard Seidel of the novel by Theodor Fontane, produced by Roland Bertschi
- 2004 for Die Erzählung der Magd Zerline by Hermann Broch, produced by Kay Link

Further nominations were received in 1990, 1991, 1992, 1996, 1997, 1998, 2001, 2003
