= FFB =

FFB may refer to:

== Businesses ==
- Fédération Française du Bâtiment, a French building trade group
- First Fidelity Bank, an American bank

== Sporting bodies ==
- Football Federation of Burundi
- Football Federation of Belarus
- Football Federation of Belize
- French Boxing Federation
- French Bridge Federation (French: Fédération Française de Bridge)

== Other organisations ==
- Federal Financing Bank, a United States government corporation
- Foundation Fighting Blindness, an American nonprofit organization
- Radio forces françaises de Berlin, a defunct French military radio broadcasting service

== Other uses ==
- Fürstenfeldbruck (district), in Germany
- Frum from birth, a Jewish phrase; see Frum
