= Foad =

Foad or FOAD may refer to:

== Slang ==
- F.O.A.D. Is Internet slang and an Initialism for "Fuck Off and Die"

== Music ==
- F.O.A.D., a 2007 album by Darkthrone

== People ==
- Foad Manshadi (born 1987), American musician and activist
- Foad Rafii (born 1947), Canadian architect
- Foad Mostafa Soltani (1948–1979), Kurdish revolutionary

== See also ==
- Fuad (name)
