= FCO =

FCO may mean:

- Buenos Aires Western Railway (Spanish: Ferrocarril Oeste de Buenos Aires)
- Club Ferro Carril Oeste, an Argentine football club
- Farm Cove Observatory, in New Zealand
- Federal Cartel Office, in Germany
- Fellow of the College of Organists
- Financial control officer, one of various names for a management-level position responsible for supervising the quality of accounting and financial reporting of an organization, also known as a comptroller
- Foreign and Commonwealth Office, the United Kingdom's Ministry of Foreign Affairs
- Fort Collins, Colorado, United States
- Leonardo da Vinci–Fiumicino Airport, near Rome, Italy
- Final Certificate of Occupancy
