= FRCP =

FRCP may refer to:

- Federal Rules of Civil Procedure
- Federal Rules of Criminal Procedure
- Fellow of the Royal College of Physicians
