= Freedom Team Salute =

U.S. Army Freedom Team Salute (FTS) was an official U.S. Army Commendation Program sponsored by the Secretary of the Army and U.S. Army Chief of Staff. The Freedom Team Salute Program began in 2005 and ceased operation at the end of February 2010. Over 2.3 million Commendations were issued by the program during its five years of operation.

The Program recognized:

- The Parents and Spouses of Active Duty Soldiers
- The Parents, Spouses, and Employers of Army National Guard and Reserve Soldiers
- Honorably Discharged Army Veterans
- All Army Supporters who have contributed to the U.S. Army mission and its Soldiers

All recipients of the Freedom Team Salute Commendation received a personalized letter and certificate of appreciation signed by both the Secretary of the Army and Army Chief of Staff, and an official U.S. Army lapel pin.
