= FG =

FG, fg, or Fg may refer to:

== Organizations ==
- Falun Gong, a Chinese organization
- Fine Gael, an Irish political party
- Fallschirmjäger, German paratroopers
- Finanzgericht, abbreviation for German Fiscal Courts
- Flamingo Gardens, a non-profit botanical garden and wildlife sanctuary
- FG (restaurant), a Michelin-starred restaurant in Rotterdam, formerly Ivy

== Places ==
- French Guiana (FIPS PUB 10-4 territory code)
- Province of Foggia, Italy (vehicle registration code)

== Science and technology ==
- F_{g}, abbreviation used in physics for the force exerted by gravitation
- fg (Unix), a computer command to resume a suspended process
- Femtogram (fg), a unit of mass
- Fiberglass, a material that includes fine fibers of glass
- Finished good, in manufacturing and inventory, goods that have completed the manufacturing process but have not yet been sold or distributed
- Fixed-gear, a bicycle without the ability to coast
- FlightGear, a free home computer flight simulator

== Sport ==
- Field goal, a method of scoring in several sports
- Forrest Griffin, a UFC fighter
- FG, an abbreviation in the game of contract bridge for "forcing to game"; see Glossary of contract bridge terms#gameforce

== Other uses ==
- FG 42, a Mauser automatic rifle
- Goodyear FG Corsair, a fighter aircraft
- Radio FG, a French language radio station playing mostly house music
- The type of gunpowder used for large bore rifles and shotguns
- The final gravity of an alcoholic beverage that has finished its fermentation
- Family Guy, an animated sitcom
- Nikon FG, an SLR camera

== See also ==
- Functional grammar (disambiguation), grammar models and theories for natural languages
