= FBM =

FBM may refer to:

- Board foot, a unit of measure for lumber
- Fleet Ballistic Missile, of the United States Navy
- Fogg Behavior Model
- Fractional Brownian motion (fBm)
- Frankfurt Book Fair (Frankfurter Buchmesse), a book trade fair in Frankfurt, Germany
- Lubumbashi International Airport (IATA: FBMI), Democratic Republic of the Congo
