= FA =

FA, Fa or fa may refer to:

== People ==
- Fa of Xia, King of China 1747–1728 BC
- Fa Ngum (1316–1393), founder and ruler of the Lao kingdom of Lan Xang
- Fa Ziying (1964–1999), Chinese serial killer

== Places ==
- Fa, Aude, a commune of the Aude département in France
- Friends Academy, Locust Valley, New York, US

== Arts and entertainment ==
- Fa (musical note)
- Fa Yuiry, a fictional character in Mobile Suit Zeta Gundam
- Fantasy Advertiser, later FA, UK fanzine
- Firearms (video game), 1998
- Fur Affinity, a furry fandom-centric art community website

== Government, law and politics ==
- Fa (philosophy), a Chinese concept
- Falange Auténtica, a Spanish political party
- Finance Act
- Fisheries Agency, Taiwan

== Languages and alphabets ==
- Fa (letter) of the Arabic abjad
- Faʼ language, Bantu language of Cameroon
- fa, ISO 639-1 code of the Persian language

== Mathematics, science, and technology ==
- Factor analysis, a statistical method
- Fanconi anemia, a genetic disease
- Fayalite, an olivine mineral
- Femtoampere (fA)
- Fluorescein angiography, for eye examination
- Folic acid, a B vitamin
- Formamidinium, a kind of Amidine
- Fractional anisotropy, degree of anisotropy
- Friedreich's ataxia, a genetic disease
- Nikon FA, a camera

== Military ==
- Fedorov Avtomat, Russian rifle, one of the world's first operational automatic rifles
- Forschungsamt, Nazi German intelligence agency
- Frontal Aviation, Soviet Air Forces battlefield air defence
- Fleet Admiral, usually the highest rank of naval officers

== Sport ==
- The Football Association, regulatory body, England
- First ascent, of a mountain
- Football association, a governing body for association football

== Transport ==
- ALCO FA, a US locomotive
- Toyota FA, a truck
- Area forecast, in aviation
- Ferrocarriles Argentinos, Argentine railways
- Safair, a South African airline, IATA code
- NZR F^{A} Class, New Zealand locomotive class

== Other uses ==
- Faculty of Arts or Intermediate of Arts, a high school diploma
- Fa (brand), of personal care products
- fa’ or Fall (unit), obsolete Scottish length unit
- Food Addicts in Recovery Anonymous (FA)
