= FFG =

FFG may refer to:

- Austrian Research Promotion Agency (German: Österreichische Forschungsförderungsgesellschaft), an Austrian government agency concerned with industrial research
- Fairmount Food Group, an American food industrial company
- Fallen from Grace, an album by American hip hop group Insane Poetry
- Fantasy Flight Games, an American game company
- FBL Financial Group, an American financial services holding company
- Fianna Fáil and Fine Gael together, historically the two largest political parties in Ireland
- First Floor Gallery Harare, a contemporary art gallery based in Harare, Zimbabwe
- Flensburger Fahrzeugbau, a German vehicle manufacturer
- Flora and Fauna Guarantee Act 1988, Victoria, Australia
- Friderico-Francisceum-Gymnasium, a German secondary school
- Friedberg station, in Germany
- French Federation of Go (French: Fédération Française de Go)
- Fur-Fish-Game, an American outdoors magazine
- Fundamental Fysiks Group, an American quantum mysticism group
- Fukuoka Financial Group, a Japanese financial company
- Guided missile frigate
- FFg, a grade of black powder used in medium and small-bore firearms
- Freies Fernsehen Gesselschaft, a proposed television channel in West Germany
