= FEBA =

FEBA may refer to:

- Forward Edge of Battle Area, i.e. front line
- Feba Radio, a broadcasting network.
- FEBA Fingerprinting, a LiveScan fingerprint and passport photo provider.
