= FR =

FR or fr may refer to:

== Places ==
- France (ISO 3166-1 alpha-2 and NATO code)
- Freiburg (vehicle registration code FR), Germany
- Freistadt (vehicle registration code FR), Austria
- Frontier Regions, a group of small administrative units in the Federally Administered Tribal Areas, Pakistan
- Province of Frosinone (ISO 3166-2:IT code FR), Italy
- Canton of Fribourg (ISO 3166-2:CH code FR), Switzerland

== Science and technology ==
- Ryan FR Fireball, a mixed-power US Navy fighter aircraft
- Flame retardant
- Flash release, a technique used in wine pressing
- Francium (symbol Fr), a chemical element
- Franklin (unit) (Fr), a unit of electrical charge
- Front-engine, rear-wheel-drive layout, of an automobile design
- Froude number (Fr), in physics
- Front Right (FR), one of the speakers in 5.1 surround sound

=== Biology and medicine ===
- French catheter scale, a scale for medical catheters
- Elias Magnus Fries (1794–1878; author abbreviation Fr.), Swedish mycologist and botanist

=== Computing ===
- .fr, the Internet country code top-level domain for France
- Fujitsu FR (Fujitsu RISC), a microprocessor
- fr-, product code prefix used by Farbrausch, e.g. fr-019
- Full Rate, a speech coding standard used in GSM
- Adobe Fresco, an Adobe software

== Publications ==
- Frankfurter Rundschau, a German newspaper
- Federal Register, a US government official journal

== Titles ==
- Father (honorific), a title for a Catholic clergyman, especially a priest
- Frater (Fr.), in Roman Catholicism, a monk who is not a priest
- Fr., a title by male members of organisations such as Ancient Mystical Order Rosae Crucis

== Transportation ==
- Ryanair (IATA code: FR), an Irish ultra low-cost airline
- Ffestiniog Railway, a tourist attraction in Gwynedd, Wales
- Furness Railway, an early British railway company

== Other uses ==
- French language (ISO 639 alpha-2 code: fr)
- Franc, a unit of currency
- Friday
- Formula Regional, a class of open-wheel racing
- Formula Renault, a racing class
- "For real?", in SMS language

== See also ==
- RF (disambiguation)
- F (disambiguation)
- R (disambiguation)
