= Flow-through share =

A flow-through share (FTS) is a Canadian tax-based financing incentive that is available to, among others, the mining sector. A FTS is a type of share issued by a corporation to a taxpayer, pursuant to an agreement with the corporation under which the issuing corporation agrees to incur eligible exploration expenses in an amount up to the consideration paid by the taxpayer for the shares.

The corporation “renounces” to the taxpayer an amount in respect of the expenditures so that the exploration and development expenses are considered to be the taxpayer's expenses for tax purposes. As a result of the corporation renouncing the expenses, the shareholder can deduct the expenses as if incurred directly.

This is a unique structure that mineral exploration firms in Canada frequently use and encourages charitable gifting.

== Impact ==
According to Canada Revenue Agency (CRA) “Certain corporations in the mining, oil and gas, and renewable energy and energy conservation sectors may issue FTSs to help finance their exploration and project development activities. The FTSs must be newly issued shares that have the attributes generally attached to common shares.

Junior resource corporations often have difficulty raising capital to finance their exploration and development activities. Moreover, many are in a non-taxable position and do not need to deduct their resource expenses. The FTS mechanism allows the issuer corporation to transfer the resource expenses to the investor. A junior resource corporation, in particular, benefits greatly from FTS financing.

When flow-through shares are donated, a lower after-tax cost of giving is achieved. The flow through donation financing structure helps senior Canadian philanthropists significantly reduce the after-tax cost of their charitable gifts while ensuring the charity chosen by the donor receives the full pledge amount immediately on closing and net of all fees and expenses.

== Structure ==
The FTS program provides tax incentives to investors who acquire FTSs by allowing:

- deductions for resource expenses renounced by eligible corporations; and
- investment tax credits for individuals (excluding trusts) on resource expenses in the mining sector that qualify as flow-through mining expenditures.

The Canada Revenue Agency (CRA) reviews all FTS arrangements. Audits are carried out to monitor the program.

The process involves the simultaneous subscription to flow through shares, thus accessing the Canadian Exploration Expense (CEE) and associated investment tax credit benefits, donation of the shares to the charity of the donors choice, and the sale by the charity of the shares to institutional investors which enables the original donor to receive a donation tax receipt.

There are four main providers of this service in Canada including WCPD, PearTree Canada, Oberon Capital Corporation, and Ber Tov Capital.
