= FWI =

FWI may refer to:

- Air Caraïbes, an airline of the French Caribbean
- Future Work Index
- Fatalities and weighted injuries
- Forest fire weather index
- French West Indies
