= FYA =

FYA may refer to:

== Airlines ==
- Flyant, a defunct Spanish airline operating 2006–2008
- Saicus Air, a defunct Spanish airline operating 2008–2010

== Music ==
- "Fya", song by BTS
- Faya (duo), an English R&B duo formerly called FYA

== Other ==
- The Foundation for Young Australians
- Flashing Yellow Arrows, a traffic signal configuration that allows for permissive left-turns at a traffic signal while eliminating yellow traps
- An abbreviation for "For Your Action", commonly used in business email communications
