= Funday PawPet Show =

1999–2017; 2018–present American internet TV series

- Genre: Comedy
- Created by: Randy "Yappy" Fox
- Voices of: YappyFox; KuddlePup (K.P.); JackRabbit (J.R.); Lilivoop; Scott Garron (Simba); Terry Sender; Herbie Hammil; Blitz
- Opening theme: Soul Bossa Nova (1999–2008); Pawpet Song by 2, The Ranting Gryphon (2008–2017)
- Ending theme: The Muppet Show end theme (episodes 2–51); Adios, Au Revoir, Auf Wiedersehen by Lawrence Welk & His Orchestra (episode 52–756; episode 835–present); Pawpet Song (instrumental) (episodes 757–834)
- Country of origin: United States
- Original language: English
- No. of episodes: 1,063

Production
- Running time: 240 minutes

Original release
- Release: November 21, 1999 – September 3, 2017
- Release: September 9, 2018 – present

Funday PawPet Show is an Internet-based puppet show created by Randy "Yappy" Fox in November 1999, broadcast on Sunday nights from 18:00 to 22:00 ET from his home in Kissimmee, Florida. Before November 25, 2007, the show aired from 19:00 to 23:00 EST, but this changed due to an increasing international audience, and until September 20, 2015, was broadcast from 18:00 to 22:00 EST. The show is also performed live at the Megaplex furry convention, held in Kissimmee, Florida, as well as at Anthrocon, held in Pittsburgh, Pennsylvania. The Funday PawPet Show has sparked a few imitations, such as Fluff & Such Productions, PawPets West, and PawPet North Coast. Other puppetry events, such as Lionel Scritchie's Dormitory at Eurofurence were partially inspired by the Funday PawPet Show.

On September 12, 2017, it was announced on the show's official main page that the show's original run had come to an end and would no longer be airing with new episodes, after almost 18 years of broadcasting and a total run of 756 episodes. The reasons cited were the end of Furstre.am and increasing audio license issues due to the music industry making it too difficult to legally use songs in their show. Video copyright complications also played a role. It was also decided that ending abruptly would be easier for the cast than doing an emotional last show, thus giving it an unexpected end.

On September 2, 2018, the Funday PawPet Twitter account officially announced the show would be revived with new episodes once again on Sunday, September 9, 2018, through different platforms by means of streaming. This was after rumors were confirmed about the series making a comeback after a year-long hiatus. Unlike the show's original run, the revival will not have new episodes on a weekly basis, so it will now run on a semi-weekly or monthly basis. On top of that, licensed content such as copyrighted music will no longer be used in the show due to royalty issues, so they must use entirely fan-created pieces or public domain music. Copyrighted videos will no longer be in the series' run either.

== Cast and characters ==
- K.P. as Ezra Shorts (sheepdog), Tod Ferret (ferret), and Spoiler (donkey)
- Yappy Fox as Rummage (raccoon) G.O.F Grey Old Fox (silver fox) BAWWK! (chicken), and Randy Fox (fox)
- J.R. as Poink T. Weasel (previously Poink T. Ferret), and Hugh Manatee (manatee)
- Brace Bear as Ying Yang (Border Collie), and JR Schnauzer (Schnauzer), prior show cast
- Simba as Crappy Doo (sheepdog), Spider (cow), Cow (spider), Arthur Braunschweiger (bobcat), Carrot (vegetable), JavaFrog (frog), Russel (tiger) and Creepy
- Mutt as Mutt (sheepdog), Scream Guy (phantom), Godzilla (Toy) and Forrest (twig), Skully (skulldog)
- StarDust as Star Crow (crow), prior show cast
- Blitz as Brunhilda "Blitz" Shepherd (German Shepherd), prior show cast
- Liesel as Puddin' Shorts (sheepdog), Lilly Voop (fox), and Audrey (ewe), prior show cast
- Devin as Nerdferret (ferret) and Mini-Randi (annoying fox), prior show cast
- Bandit (a real Border Collie owned by the show's creator, Randy "Yappy" Fox) as himself, deceased
- Toxxie as Toxxie (miniature Australian shepherd)
- DashingFoxie as DashingFoxie (arctic fox)
- OniKidou as OniKidou (hobkin)
- Tinkering with Atkelar as Atkelar (cat)

== Frequently occurring show activities ==
ArtJam
The viewers are asked to contribute some self-made artwork on a chosen theme. The Funday PawPet Show's website has an archive of all art submitted since 1999. Prior to Art Jams officially starting, viewers started sending in their artwork on their own. It was shared throughout the show.
Picture Captions
The viewers are asked to send in a suitable caption for a certain picture. The captions are broadcast near the end of the show.
Roll Call
One of the cast members or guests reads the nicknames of those in the show's IRC channel while the "Jarabe tapatío" is played. For some broadcasts, such as ones with notable guests or upcoming holidays, a song matching the guest or holiday may be used instead. The verbal roll call was discontinued on episode 500; the chat room names are now listed in the show's closing credits.
Spits-or-Swallows
The cast eats or drinks something their viewers have sent in, often a food or drink that is generally viewed as displeasing to many.
Subservience
Inspired by Burger King's The Subservient Chicken, this segment consists of a cast member appearing on camera and performing actions based on suggestions from the audience. It usually features fursuiters, though there have been exceptions, such as Episode 315's Subservient Rasvar, Episode 362's Subservient Captain Jack Sparrow, and Episode 369's Subservient BassMan.
The Pink Flamingo Challenge
Show visitors are treated to some sort of pastry (preferably of a chocolatey nature) which they are encouraged to eat while viewing a short clip from the ending to the movie Pink Flamingos (in which "(How Much Is) That Doggie in the Window?" is played, while Divine chews and swallows dog feces). Since this portion of the film is disturbingly graphic, only the audience's reaction is shown to viewers. On some occasions, a substitute food item (such as a burrito) is offered; on rarer occasions, such as a fursuiting guest, no item is offered.
Paw Tweets
Announcements, such as birthdays or shout-outs, sent in by viewers up to 140 characters are read aloud. This usually takes place late in the show to allow time for submissions to be made.
Garrison Skunk's Top 60 Quotes of the Night
A weekly listing of the current episode's funniest/oddest statements is read by Poink, who alternates even/odd numbered quotes with others, including Simba, Yappy, Ezra and Liesel. The feature was begun by longtime viewer and contributor Garrison Skunk who wanted to preserve some notable quotes when it was announced that episode 324 was not being taped due to a machine error. As a joke, the feature retains the number 60 in its title despite growing to over 80 quotes a week, although there have been two alterations. In honor of episode 350, the name was changed to 'Top 350 Quotes of the Night', leading Ezra and Poink to rush through the first page's quotes 350 – 342, only to find that quotes 341 – 61 consisted of a picture of cast member Eaglebeagle saying "Bloop!", with page 3 continuing as normal. The second time this occurred was after the cast took a three-week hiatus, when Garrison presented the "Top 20 Things Said in Channel Over the Past Three Weeks".

== Memorable shows ==
The Funday PawPet Show had many episodes with unusual or memorable topics. Frequently, themed shows celebrate major holidays such as Christmas, New Year's, Halloween, Valentine's Day, Thanksgiving, the Fourth of July, and Christmas in July. On many occasions, the cast went out to various sites to film sequences. Some of the most notable of these shows include trips to conventions such as Fx and MegaCon to interview many of the guest celebrities. The cast did interviews with the actors from the 1971 film Willy Wonka & the Chocolate Factory. In that show, "Mutt" kept getting thrown from one star to the next for asking them "stupid questions". Other celebrities interviewed on the show include: Jason Marsden (Max Goof from A Goofy Movie), Jay North (Dennis the Menace), Jeremy Bulloch (Boba Fett from Star Wars), and Noel MacNeal (Bear from Bear in the Big Blue House). The show also had "bumpers" or intros done by various individuals including the a cappella group Toxic Audio.

The show had many recurring gags. On the Easter shows, the viewers were challenged to find new and creative ways to destroy chocolate rabbits in "Chocolate Bunny Deaths". During the Christmas and Christmas in July shows, the cast took part in white elephant gift exchanges on the air, from which some cast members received things like edible underwear, half of a sub sandwich, and a 5-pound container of lard. A Halloween show featured video of purple monsters attempting to scare the Trick or Treaters that appear at the front door of the house where the show is filmed.

"The Ferret Takeover Show"
Inspired by the film Being John Malkovich, the cast one by one enter a strange back door in the stage and transform into ferrets.

"The Drunk Show"
Inspired by an episode of WKRP in Cincinnati and intended to celebrate the show's 21st episode (the drinking age in Florida, although for various reasons the topic was ultimately pushed back to the 23rd show), the cast (all of whom agreed to give up their car keys and spend the night in the studio) took one shot of Rumple Minze for every half-hour of broadcast time. This show is considered a somewhat controversial episode of PawPets.

"The Sinkhole Show"
This was another controversial show. This Halloween show ran a quick disclaimer at the very beginning of the broadcast stating that "the show is a dramatization." The disclaimer was run only once. During the course of the broadcast, cast members began talking about a sinkhole that had really formed elsewhere in Orlando. Later, the cast began to describe a fictitious sinkhole forming in the front yard of the house that was threatening to destroy it. At the end of the program, the cast tipped over the stage and severed all connections and feed lines, making it appear as if the house had indeed fallen into a sinkhole.

Portions of this episode were repeated in show #352 (November 4, 2007) where Mutt explained "Yappy had literally ripped all of the plugs and power out of the wall (except for one in the bedroom) so no matter how techie you were, it looked like the entire show just dropped, there was no server, there was no nothing."

Ezra: "JR and I tipped the stage forward, Rasvar moved the lighting truss and Simba dropped a piece of drywall and a couple other things in front of the stage to make it look like everything was happening. Yappy had every single connection in the house yanked out of the wall, except for one, and that was the one that we had in the kitchen, and we were all huddled around one laptop, watching everyone's reaction when everything went dark."

Ezra continued: "Within about two minutes, every cellphone in this house started ringing, asking us how we were doing."

Poink: "They were pissed for weeks."

Mutt: "But about a month later, that was voted the best show ever."

"The Arthur Awards"
Named after the PawPet Show character Arthur Braunschweiger, this is a parody of the Oscars held on the Sunday night closest to the show, and features categories such as "Best Running Joke" and "Best Song they Never Play on the Show Anymore". Topics are selected about two months prior to the show, and viewers were able to vote on them from the PawPet Show's website.

"9/11 Special"
On the night of September 11, 2001 the cast quickly assembled for an impromptu show to help calm people and find out who in the community was directly affected by the 9/11 attacks. This is the only show that was intentionally never made available for the weekly download. As such, it has not yet resurfaced online. Viewers sent the cast thank-you letters and awards for their efforts.

"2007 Telethon"
On November 11, 2007, the show raised $10,052 by the end of the show. This count does not include the auctions that were still going on or the donations being sent in via mail. The goal for this year's telethon was $6,000. Also, a new audience record was set with 225 viewers in the chat room.

"2012 Gary Gnu Call-In"
On May 13, 2012, the voice of Gary Gnu, from "The Great Space Coaster" called in to the show "accidentally" while attempting to call his mother, Gnatalie Gnu, for Mother's Day. Immediately following the Gary Gnu call-in, puppeteer Jim Martin, who voiced the character, called in to talk about a fundraiser for the restoration of the program tapes and preservation in possible museums. When the episode started, the fundraiser had been underway for several weeks and had raised $185. By the end of this episode, over $1200 has been raised. Jim later thanked the "Furry community" for their generosity and the Funday Pawpet Show for "getting the word out". The goal amount for kickstarting the project was reached.

"End of the World Show"
On December 16, 2012, the entire show revolved around a fictitious asteroid, which would strike at 9:50 and end the show and the world. During the show, various videos showing asteroids travelling toward the earth are shown, Meanwhile, Blitz names the asteroid "Apawcalypse". The episode ends with President Obama holding an emergency broadcast about the meteor hit.

"It Ends"
On September 3, 2017, the original final episode of Funday Pawpet Show aired as the following week was a vacation due to Hurricane Irma and the announcement of the show's ending coming September 12.

"It Restarts!"
On September 9, 2018, the series officially came back with a new episode resulting in a revival run, with many of its cast returning after a year-long hiatus. The series now continues with new episodes on a semi-weekly or monthly basis.
