= FHI =

FHI may refer to:

- Family Health International, now FHI 360
- Food for the Hungry International
- Franklin Humanities Institute at Duke University
- Fritz Haber Institute of the Max Planck Society in Berlin, Germany
- Fuchs heterochromic iridocyclitis
- Fuji Heavy Industries, the former name of Subaru Corporation (until 2017)
- Future of Humanity Institute, former research centre at the University of Oxford
- Heist railway station, in Belgium
- Fédération Haltéphile International, now the International Weightlifting Federation
- Norwegian Institute of Public Health (Folkehelseinstituttet)
