= Future Office System =

Future Office System (FOS) is a workflow and case management system developed by Anite and used by the Crown Office and Procurator Fiscal Service for the processing of criminal cases in Scotland, United Kingdom.

From 43 offices throughout Scotland, 1,300 Crown Office and Procurator Fiscal Service staff use FOS to streamline the complex procedures required to handle in excess of 300,000 reports of crime and sudden deaths per year.

Anite created the FOS system at their Glasgow office with development starting in the year 2000. Over 150-man years later, work continues to this day extending and enhancing FOS to meet the evolving business and legislative demands of COPFS and Scottish Government.
