= Fragment separator =

A fragment separator is an ion-optical device used to focus and separate products from the collision of relativistic ion beams with thin targets. Selected products can then be studied individually. Fragment separators typically consist of a series of superconducting magnetic multipole elements. The thin target immediately before the separator allows the fragments produced through various reactions to escape the target material still at a very high velocity. The products are forward-focused because of the high velocity of the center-of-mass in the beam-target interaction, which allows fragment separators to collect a large fraction (in some cases nearly all) of the fragments produced in the target. Some examples of currently operating Fragment separators are the FRS at GSI, the A1900 at NSCL, and BigRIPS of Radioactive Isotope Beam Factory at RIKEN.
