= FBIS =

FBIS may refer to:

- Foreign Broadcast Information Service
- Fellow of the British Interplanetary Society

== See also ==
- The FBIs
