= FKT =

FKT may refer to:

- Falkland Islands Time
- Fastest known time, to complete a route
- Fin Komodo Teknologi, company of Indonesia
- FKT algorithm, in graph theory
- FK Tønsberg, a Norwegian football club
