= FDI =

FDI may refer to:

== Finance ==
- fDi magazine, a British foreign direct investment publication
- Federal Deposit Insurance Corporation, a United States government corporation
- Foreign direct investment, purchase of an asset in a country by another country's company

== Computing ==
- Field Device Integration, an International Electrotechnical Commission standards
- Flexible Display Interface
- Formatted Disk Image, part of the Unified emulator format

== Health and medicine ==
- FDI World Dental Federation
- First dorsal interosseous, muscle in the hand

== Politics ==
- Brothers of Italy (FdI, from the Italian name Fratelli d'Italia), an Italian political party
- Foundation for Democracy in Iran, a US-based Iranian dissident organization

== Other uses ==
- Fault detection and isolation, in control engineering
- Films Division of India, a government-owned film production company in India
- Frégate de défense et d'intervention, a class of frigates of the French Navy
