= Mads Fogh =

Danish footballer (born 1988)

Personal information
- Date of birth: 19 September 1988 (age 38)
- Place of birth: ?, Denmark
- Height: 1.85 m (6 ft 1 in)
- Position: Forward

Senior career*
Years	Team	Apps	(Gls)
- Kolding Boldklub
2007	Vejle Boldklub	1	(0)
2007–2011	Kolding FC		
2011	Middelfart G&BK		
2011–2013	Kolding FC		
2013–2014	Kolding IF		
- * Club domestic league appearances and goals as of 25 July 2007

Mads Fogh (born 19 September 1988) is a Danish professional football player.
