= FKP =

FKP may refer to:

== Organizations ==
- FKP (company), an Australian property company
- The Casimir Pulaski Foundation (Polish: Fundacja im. Kazimierza Pułaskiego), a Polish think tank
- Frogman Corps (Denmark) (Danish: Frømandskorpset), part of the Royal Danish Navy
- FKP Architects, an American architecture firm

== Politics ==
- Future Korea Party, a defunct political party in South Korea
- Federated Parliamentary Club (Poland) (Polish: Federacyjny Klub Parlamentarny), a defunct political coalition
- Free Conservative Party (German: Freikonservative Partei), a political party of the German Empire

== Other ==
- Falkland Islands pound (£), with currency code FKP
- FK Partizan, a Serbian football club
- FK Pirmasens, a German football club
