= Front Royal–Warren County Airport =

- IATA: FRR; ICAO: KFRR; FAA LID: FRR

Summary
- Airport type: Public
- Owner: County of Warren
- Serves: Front Royal, Virginia
- Elevation AMSL: 709 ft (216 m)
- Coordinates: 38°55′03″N 078°15′12″W
- Website: Front Royal-Warren County Airport

Map
- Location within Northern Virginia Location within Virginia

Runways
Direction	Length		Surface
Direction	ft	m	Surface
10/28	3,008	917	Asphalt

Statistics (2020)
- Aircraft operations: 16,334
- Based aircraft: 49
- Source: Federal Aviation Administration

Front Royal–Warren County Airport (IATA: FRR, ICAO: KFRR, FAA LID: FRR) is a public airport three miles west of Front Royal in Warren County, Virginia. The National Plan of Integrated Airport Systems for 2011–2015 categorized it as a general aviation facility.

== Facilities ==
The airport covers 90 acres (36 ha) at an elevation of 709 feet (216 m). Its single runway, 10/28, is 3,008 by 75 feet (917 x 23 m) asphalt.

In the year ending 31 December 2022, the airport had 16,334 aircraft operations, average 45 per day: 93% general aviation, 3% military, and 4% air taxi. 49 aircraft were then based at the airport: 24 single-engine, 20 gliders, 2 ultralight, 3 helicopters and no multi-engine or jet.
