= Fro =

Fro or FRO may refer to:

- 'fro, a contraction of "afro", a hairstyle
- Frø (Freyr), a Norse god

== Institutions and organizations ==
- Family Responsibility Office, Government of Ontario, Canada
- Forest range officer, in India
- Frontline Ltd., an oil tanker shipping company
- Voluntary Radio Organisation (Frivilliga radioorganisationen), a Swedish volunteer defense organization

== Places ==
- 6666 Frö, a main-belt asteroid
- Faroe Islands
- Florø Airport, Norway
- Frome railway station, England

== Other uses ==
- Fixed return option
- Old French

== See also ==
- Froe
