= FSO =

FSO may refer to:

== Government ==
- Federal Protective Service (Russia) (Russian: Federalnaya Sluzhba Okhrany), responsible for the security of Russian state officials
- Federal Statistical Office (Switzerland)
- Financial Secretary's Office, of the Government of Hong Kong
- Foreign Service Officer, of the United States Foreign Service
- Forest Section Officer, in India

== Music ==
- Fairfax Symphony Orchestra, in Virginia, United States
- Frankston Symphony Orchestra, in Victoria, Australia
- Fulham Symphony Orchestra, in London
- "F.S.O.", the first single from the Regurgitator album Tu-Plang
- Film Symphony Orchestra, Czech classical orchestra

== Transport ==
- Fabryka Samochodów Osobowych, a Polish automotive company
- Franklin County State Airport, in Vermont, United States
- Subiaco railway station, in Western Australia

== Other uses ==
- Fire Support Officer
- Flash shared object
- Floating storage and offloading
- Free-space optical communication
- Flag Service Organization
