= The F.O.D. Control Corporation =

American Aerospace Company

- Type: Private
- Industry: Aviation Safety
- Founded: San Bernardino, California (1983)
- Headquarters: Dallas, Texas, U.S.
- Area served: [U.S. Department of Defense, Airlines, Airports, Aerospace Manufacturing]
- Key people: Garth Hughes (President)
- Website: http://www.FODControl.com/

The F.O.D. Control Corporation is a private company that serves the aerospace industry's need for equipment and information to address FOD (Foreign Object Damage/Debris) issues in airport and manufacturing environments.

Based in Dallas, Texas the company helps the aerospace industry implement or improve FOD prevention programs by providing educational and training materials and equipment. This includes the FOD Prevention Program manual, "MAKE IT FOD FREE", the online news and information resource FODNews.com, and the online FOD Prevention Program resource FODProgram.com.

== History ==
Founder Gary Chaplin started the business in March 1983 in San Bernardino, California, in response to the US Air Force's need for improved methods to remove debris from their airfield pavements and aircraft operating surfaces.

The first product introduced was a truck-bumper mounted permanent magnetic sweeper (trade name Power Bar) at Norton AFB in California. The product replaced its less efficient predecessor, the gas-powered electromagnetic sweeper, at over 90% of military airfields and many civilian airports.

The firm's military customers requested help in clearing their airfields of more than just ferrous metal material. Sand, rocks, broken paving materials and non-ferrous work generated hardware presented a problem that conventional truck mounted vacuum sweepers and FOD walks were not thoroughly handling.

Chaplin came across a traction driven lawn and leaf sweeper, and realized that if made larger it would offer a solution for sweeping non-ferrous debris. He invented the Fodbuster RockSweeper in 1987. A towable, traction driven sweeper with brush drive mechanism geared to its wheels, the Fodbuster was brought to market to serve military and civilian airfields.

Soon after the RockSweeper introduction, the company embarked on an expansion of their product offerings to meet the growing requirements of the aviation industry. New lines were added, including walk-behind vacuum sweepers, small parts organizers, debris deposal containers, and promotional and awareness training materials such as posters, decals and downloadable PowerPoint training presentations.

In 2004 Chaplin published "MAKE IT FOD FREE, The Ultimate FOD Prevention Program Manual”.

Following the MAKE IT FOD FREE book” project, FODNews.com was launched as a free online news publication. Specializing in news and information about FOD control methods and FOD related issues, it includes links to news articles, instructional materials, research reports, photos, and videos.

In 2012 the company was purchased by Garth Hughes.

In 2014 Hughes launched FODProgram.com, the first comprehensive online resource for FOD Prevention Program Management.
