= FMR =

FMR may refer to:

== Design ==
- Front mid-engine, rear-wheel-drive layout
- Fujitsu FMR, a Japanese computer architecture

== Financial ==
- Fidelity Management and Research, an American investment management company

== Legal ==
- Federal Management Regulation, in the United States Code of Federal Regulations

== Medical ==
- FMR (chemotherapy), a chemotherapy regimen

== Music ==
- Favorite Music Radio, a Philippine radio network owned by Philippine Collective Media Corporation
- Festival Mushroom Records, a defunct Australian record label
- Fine Music Radio, broadcasting in Cape Town, South Africa
- FMR Records, an English record label

== Publishing ==
- FMR Magazine, an art periodical published by the eponymous Franco Maria Ricci
- Francisco Martins Rodrigues, Portuguese communist author

== Science ==
- Ferromagnetic resonance

== Sports ==
- Mexican Rugby Federation (Spanish: Federación Mexicana de Rugby)
- Monegasque Rugby Federation (French: Fédération Monégasque de Rugby)

== Other ==
- Les Fusiliers Mont-Royal, a Canadian reserve infantry unit
- Falmer railway station, a railway station in Sussex, England
