= FK =

FK or fk may refer to:

== Arts and entertainment ==
- Fox Kids, an American TV programming block (1990–2002)
- Funky Kong, a 1994 video game character

== Language ==
- Finders keepers (English adage)
- 'Football Club', abbreviated "FK" in Slavic and Balkan countries
- Fuck, an English-language vulgarity

== Places ==
- FK postcode area, central Scotland
- Falkland Islands, a British territory (ISO 3166/FIPS PUB 10-4 :FK)

== Science and technology ==
- .fk, top-level Internet domain for the Falkland Islands
- Foreign key, in database design
- Forward kinematics, in robotics and animation
- Kinetic friction, in mechanics

== Other uses ==
- First aid kit
- First Corridor rail coach
- Africa West Airlines (IATA airline designator FK)
