= Forum for European–Australian Science and Technology Cooperation =

Forum for European-Australian Science and Technology cooperation
- Type: non-profit organisation
- Founded: 2002
- Headquarters: Canberra, Australia
- Key people: Neil Hamilton, Mark Matthews, Rado Faletič, Jean-François Desvignes-Hicks

The Forum for European–Australian Science and Technology Cooperation (FEAST) was a non-government initiative aimed at highlighting and developing collaborative research activities between Europe (European countries and the European Union) and Australia. Its offices were located in Canberra, Australia.

== Funding ==
The major sources of funding for FEAST were the European Commission, through the Seventh Framework Programme, and the Australian Government Department of Industry, Innovation, Science, Research and Tertiary Education. Additional resources were also provided by The Australian National University.

== History ==
A meeting of the joint Management Committee of the European Union and Australia on Science and Technology Cooperation was held in Brussels in March 2000, within the framework of the 1994 Agreement. One of the decisions made was to begin reflecting upon a target-based approach based on a strategy and common priorities.

In this context it was agreed in August 2000 by the diplomatic missions representing members of the European Union in Australia, to embark on an initiative of the French Presidency, to be known as the Forum for European-Australian Science and Technology (FEAST).

This initiative began in early 2002, and the first phase was completed in December 2004. An external review was undertaken , recommending expansion of the FEAST concept to other countries, and a continuation of FEAST in Australia.

After completion of its third round of funding in mid-2012, the fourth implementation was renamed Connecting Australian-European Science and Innovation Excellence (CAESIE) and placed a greater emphasis on innovation and business. This project concluded at the end of 2015, and no further implementations of the FEAST bilateral initiative have been implemented since.
