= FOTA =

FOTA or Fota may refer to:

== FOTA ==
- FOTA (technology), firmware over-the-air
- Free over-the-air television
- Formula One Teams Association, in motorsport

== Fota ==
- Fota (moth), a moth genus
- Fota Island, Cork Harbour, Ireland
  - Fota Wildlife Park, on Fota Island
  - Fota railway station, on Fota Island
- Fotă, a traditional Romanian skirt

=== People ===
- Ferchar Fota, 7th century king of Dál Riata
- Nicușor Fota (born 1996), Romanian footballer
