= Trade Union Social Citizens List =

Trade Union Social Citizens List (Danish: Faglig Social Borgerliste) is a political group in Høje-Taastrup, Denmark.

In the 2005 municipal elections FSB got 351 votes (1.5%) and no seat. Its main candidate was Marianne Videbæk Bendtsen, who got 115 personal preference votes.
