= FRA =

Fra is a title of a friar.

Fra or FRA may also refer to:

== Codes ==
- FRA, the ISO 3166-1 alpha-3 and UNDP country code for France
  - fra, the ISO 639-2 code for the French language
- FRA, the IOC country code for France at the Olympics
- Framingham station, Amtrak station code
- Frankfurt Airport, Germany, IATA code

== Education ==
- Flint River Academy, Woodbury, Georgia, US
- Franklin Road Academy, Nashville, Tennessee, US

== Molecular biology ==
- Fra1, aka Fos-related antigen 1
- Fra2, aka Fos-related antigen 2

== Agencies, organizations, and companies ==
- Alfarista Radical Front (Spanish: Frente Radical Alfarista), an Ecuadorian political party
- Federal Railroad Administration, American agency
- Fleet Reserve Association
- Fundamental Rights Agency of the European Union
- Forces Royales Air, the official French name for the Royal Moroccan Air Force
- National Defence Radio Establishment (Swedish: Försvarets radioanstalt), in Sweden
  - FRA law (Swedish: FRA-lagen), in Sweden

== Other uses ==
- Fra McCann (born 1953), Irish politician
- Fixed-radio access or wireless local loop
- Flash Recovery Area, an Oracle Database technology
- Formula Regional Americas Championship (FRA championship), a Formula 3 regional racing league
- Forward rate agreement
- Full retirement age, in US Social Security
