= Feat =

Feat or FEAT may refer to:

- FEAT (album), a 2012 The Hood Internet album
- Feat (d20 System), concept in role-playing game system d20
- Feat (stato di natura), a 2020 album by Francesca Michielin
- An abbreviation for featuring, used in credit lists to indicate a guest appearance (common in music)
- Far Eastern Air Transport
- FEAT Stiftung (Foundation for Exceptional Abilities and Talents)
- Feats, a reputed sorcerer in the 1593 book A Dialogue Concerning Witches and Witchcrafts

== See also ==
- Feature, or "feat.", a guest appearance by an artist on a work
