= FTSE =

FTSE may refer to:

- FTSE Group, a British provider of stock market indices
- FTSE 100 Index and other stock market indices:
  - FTSE/Athex Large Cap (symbol: FTSE) on the Athens Stock Exchange
- Fundamental theorem of software engineering
- Fellow of the Australian Academy of Technological Sciences and Engineering
