= Fud =

Fud or FUD may refer to

== People ==
- "Fud" John Benson (artisan) (1939–2024), American artist
- Fud Candrix (1908–1974), Belgian jazz saxophonist and violinist
- Fud Leclerc (1924–2010), Belgian singer
- Fud Livingston (1906–1957), American jazz musician

== Other uses ==
- Female urination device
- Fear, uncertainty and doubt, a propaganda tactic
- Fud (brand) of Sigma Alimentos foods
- Federal University Dutse, Nigeria
- fud, the ISO 639-3 code for the Futunan language
- Funds under management

== See also ==
- Formerly Used Defense Sites (FUDS) of the U.S. military
- Fudd (disambiguation)
