= FSSP =

FSSP may refer to:

- Families of structurally similar proteins, a protein structures database
- Federal Bailiffs Service (Russia), abbreviated FSSP in Russian
- Firing squad synchronization problem, a problem in computer science and cellular automata
- Frances Slocum State Park, a state park in Luzerne County, Pennsylvania
- Priestly Fraternity of Saint Peter, a society of traditionalist Catholic priests and seminarians
- Fresh Start Schools Programme, a programme for schools in South Africa
- Forward Scattering Spectrometer Probe, a class of optical instruments designed to measure size and concentration of particles suspended in the air (such as cloud droplets)
