= FJI =

FJI may refer to:

- Fellow of the Institute of Journalists
- Fiji
- Fiji Airways
- Florida Justice Institute
