= FAAD =

FAAD may refer to:

- a fellow of the American Academy of Dermatology
- Freeware Advanced Audio Decoder, an AAC audio decoder, superseded by new version: FAAD2
- Faad Sana (born 2003), Togolese footballer
