= Far West Capital =

US custom financing company

- Company type: privately held
- Industry: finance
- Founded: 2007
- Founder: Don Stricklin; Cole Harmonson
- Headquarters: Austin, Texas
- Area served: Austin; Houston; Dallas; El Paso, Texas; Phoenix, Arizona
- Services: factoring of accounts receivable asset-based lending purchase order financing inventory financing transportation financing
- Number of employees: 25
- Website: farwestcapital.com

Far West Capital is a custom financing company. The company has offices in Austin, Houston, Dallas, El Paso, Texas and Phoenix, Arizona. operating as a subsidiary of Houston-based Advantage Business Capital.

== Services ==
Far West Capital provides factoring of accounts receivable, asset-based lending, purchase order financing, inventory financing and transportation financing. The company services clients from various industries, including manufacturing, construction, wholesalers/distributors, B2B services providers, high-tech, bio-technology, staffing and transportation.

== History ==
Far West Capital was founded in 2007 by Don Stricklin and Cole Harmonson in Austin, Texas. Since its inception, the company has grown and expanded its offices to Houston, Texas, Dallas, Texas, El Paso, Texas and Phoenix, Arizona. The company employs 25 employees and has served more than 200 clients, with an annual growth of 20% each year.

Far West Capital provided $300 million in financing in 2011, $500 million in financing in 2012 and has projected $600 million in financing in 2013.

Far West Capital was acquired by Advantage Business Capital in June 2018.
