= Federación Mexicana de Esgrima =

Sports governing body in Mexico

Mexican Fencing Federation
- Sport: Fencing
- Jurisdiction: Mexico
- Affiliation: FIE
- Location: México city
- President: Jorge Castro Rea
- (Mexico)

The Mexican Fencing Federation (Federación Mexicana de Esgrima) is the ruling body of all kinds of fencing in Mexico and operates under the aegis of CONADE (Comisión Nacional de Cultura Física y Deporte). Jorge Castro Rea is the current president of the federation.

The federation was disaffiliated by the International Fencing Federation in December 2025, following years of alleged mismanagement.
