= Fos =

FOS or Fos may refer to:

== Arts and entertainment ==
- Fos (EP), by Elena Paparizou
- Fortress of Solitude, fictional base of Superman

== Food ==
- French onion soup, a dish
- Fructooligosaccharide, a sweetener

== Government, law and military ==
- Financial Ombudsman Service, in the United Kingdom
- Financial Ombudsman Service (Australia)
- Forward Operating Site, in the U.S. military
- Freedom of speech, a human right
- Future Office System, Scottish prosecutors' case system

== People ==
- Fos Williams (1922–2001), Australian-rules footballer
- Peter J. Fos (born 1949), American academic administrator

== Places ==
- Fos, Haute-Garonne, France
- Fos, Hérault, France
- Fos-sur-Mer, Bouches-du-Rhône, France
- Marseille-Fos Port, France
- Forrest Airport, Western Australian refuelling airfield, IATA code FOS
- French Overseas Territories, UNDP country code, see Overseas territory (France)

== Science and technology ==
- Fabric OS, in networking
- Factor of safety, in engineering
- Feature-oriented scanning, in microscopy
- Faint Object Spectrograph, on the Hubble Space Telescope
- Fields of Science and Technology, a classification for academic statistics
- Flowers of sulfur
- Flowers of sulfur tests

=== Molecular biology ===
FOS-family transcription factors:

- c-Fos, a proto-oncogene
- FosB, a proto-oncogene
- ΔFosB, a truncated splice variant of FosB
- FOSL1, Fos-related antigen 1
- FOSL2, Fos-related antigen 2

== Other uses ==
- Florida Ornithological Society, United States
- FOS Open Scouting, a Belgian youth organisation
- Goodwood Festival of Speed, an English hill-climbing event
