= FID =

A fid is a conical tool traditionally made of wood or bone, used to work with rope and canvas.

FID or fid may also refer to:

- FID, IATA code for Elizabeth Field (Suffolk County, New York), U.S.
- FID, the country code used by FIDE
- The Fid, a mountain in Antarctica
- F.I.D. (album), by Masami Akita
- Fédération internationale de documentation (FID), a defunct international organization, see International Federation for Information and Documentation
- Financial institutions duty, an Australian tax
- Firearms identification (often, FID card), defined as part of gun laws in Massachusetts
- Flame ionization detector
- Flight initiation distance
- Foreign internal defense
- Fréchet inception distance, image quality metric
- Free induction decay
- Focus-image distance, in projectional radiography
- Falkland Islands Dependencies, a former grouping of British territories in Antarctica and the South Atlantic
- Stop the Decline (Italian: Fermare il Declino), an Italian political party
