= FCZ =

FCZ may refer to:

- FC Z, a Swedish television series
- Fussballclub Zürich, a Swiss football club
- FCZ: an EEG electrode site according to the 10-20 system
