= FLSA =

FLSA may refer to:

- Fair Labor Standards Act of 1938, a United States labor law
- French Language Services Act, a law in the province of Ontario, Canada
