= FBR =

FBR may refer to:

== Science, medicine, and technology ==
- Fast breeder reactor, a type of nuclear reactor
- Fluidized bed reactor, in chemical engineering
- Foreign body response, in biology
- Full bridge rectifier, in electrical circuits

== Other uses ==
- Beveren railway station, Belgium (station code: FBR)
- FBR Capital Markets, an American investment banking firm
- Federal Board of Revenue, central revenue collection agency of Pakistan
- Foreign Births Register, an Irish government voluntary registry of the second generation of Irish citizens born abroad
- Fortnite Battle Royale, a video game
- Foundation for Biomedical Research, an American animal welfare organization
- Free Burma Rangers, a Burmese humanitarian organization
- Friedman Billings Ramsey, an American real estate investment trust
- Fueled by Ramen, an American record label
- FBR Ltd, formerly Fastbrick Robotics, an Australian construction robot development company
