= FOT =

Fot or FOT may refer to:

== Arts and entertainment ==
- The Fall of Troy (band), an American rock band
- Fallout Tactics: Brotherhood of Steel, a computer game
- False or True, a British television programme

== Science and technology ==
- Fast optical transient
- Flight operations team
- Frequency of optimum transmission
- The Fot1 family of Fusarium oxysporum transposable elements

== Transport ==
- Fo Tan station, in Hong Kong
- Fort railway station, in Sri Lanka
- Rohnerville Airport, in California, United States
- FOT, free on truck, an historic form of international commercial term or Incoterm
- Forster (Wallis Island) Airport, IATA airport code "FOT"

== Other uses ==
- Fot, 11th-century Swedish runemaster
- Fót, a town in Pest county, Hungary
- Feast of Tabernacles, part of the Jewish religious festival of Sukkot
- Festival of Trees
- Fotki, a photo sharing web-site
- Future-oriented therapy, a form of psychotherapy
