= FAPA =

FAPA can refer to:

- Fantasy Amateur Press Association
- Fatty acid primary amide, a family of signalling compounds
- The (United States) Federal Administrative Procedure Act
- Fellow of the American Psychiatric Association
- First Amendment Protected Activity
- Formosan Association for Public Affairs
- Florida Academy of Physician Assistants
- Fellow of the American Psychiatric Association
