= Federation of Associations of Maharashtra =

Federation of Associations of Maharashtra (FAM) is a Mumbai-based summit organisation of 750 small-scale and trade & service providers associations in Maharashtra, India. Founded in 1979, it led traders against what it considered "harsh provisions" of the Maharashtra Value Added Tax Act in April 2005. FAM has opposed measures by the Indian government to allow foreign direct investment (FDI) in the retail sector. It has likened FDI in retail to a foreign invasion. In a protest in which it participated 3.5 million member establishments closed for a one-day bandh. In October, 2012 the opposition Bharatiya Janata Party has cited a letter written to FAM by Manmohan Singh, Prime Minister of India, in 2002, when he was the leader of the opposition in the Rajya Sabha, India's upper house of parliament, alleging double standards practiced by him. It is a co-signatory to a letter written in 2010 that called for a halt to "Free Trade Agreement" negotiations between India and the European Union. It is associated with a ₹100 billion urban redevelopment project at Chira Bazar in Mumbai.
