= FCE =

FCE may refer to:

== Arts and entertainment ==
- FCE Ultra, NES emulation software (retired 2004)
- Final Cut Express, video editing software (released 2003)
- FireChaser Express, a rollercoaster in Tennessee, US (opened 2013)
- Fondo de Cultura Económica, a Mexican publishing house (formed 1934)
  - FCE USA, its American subsidiary (formed 1990)

== Association football ==
- FC Edmonton, Canada (founded 2010)
- FC Eintracht Rheine, NRW, Germany (formed 1994)
- FC Energie Cottbus, Brandenburg, Germany (founded 1963)

== Rail transport ==
- Cottesloe railway station, Perth, Australia
- Ferrovia Circumetnea, Sicily
- Fianarantsoa-Côte Est railway, Madagascar

== Science ==
- Feed conversion efficiency, in agriculture
- Feedback-controlled electromigration, a physics experiment
- Final consumption expenditure, in macroeconomics
- Focal choroidal excavation, an eye disease
- Functional capacity evaluation, in occupational rehabilitation

== Other uses ==
- First Certificate in English, an IELTS qualification (now B2 First; created 1939)
- Forest City Enterprises, an American real estate firm (founded 1920)
- Free Church of England, a British Christian denomination (founded 1834)
