= FAW =

FAW or Faw can refer to:

- Football Association of Wales, the third-oldest national association in the world
- Fellowship of Australian Writers, an Australian lobbying group
- FAW Group, a Chinese automotive manufacturing company
- Al-Faw Peninsula, a marshy region adjoining the Persian Gulf
- Al-Faw, a small port town in Iraq
- Al-Faw Palace, a palace in Baghdad
- Fall armyworm, an American food pest, now spreading in Southern Africa
- Fleet Air Wing, see Patrol Wing (United States Navy)
