= FLB =

FLB may refer to:

- Brandenburg Football Association (German: Fußball-Landesverband Brandenburg)
- Breton Liberation Front (French: Front de Libération de la Bretagne), a paramilitary group in France
- Faint little ball, a Drosophila gene
- Faulconbridge railway station, in New South Wales, Australia
- Favourite-longshot bias, in gambling and economics
- Federal Land Bank, part of the United States Farm Credit System
- Flashlight Brown, a Canadian punk rock band
- Fly Linhas Aéreas, a defunct Brazilian airline
- Frihetliga Ljusdalsbygden, a Swedish political party
- General Aviation FLB, an American aircraft
- Lebanese Basketball Federation (French: Fédération Libanaise de Basketball)
- Stade Francis-Le Blé, a stadium in Brest, France
