= FPF =

FPF may refer to:

== Sport ==
- Peruvian Football Federation (Spanish: Federación Peruana de Fútbol)
- Portuguese Football Federation (Portuguese: Federação Portuguesa de Futebol)
- Puerto Rican Football Federation (Spanish: Federación Puertorriqueña de Fútbol)
- Federação Paraibana de Futebol, Football Federaition of the Paraíba, Brasil.
- Federação Piauiense de Futebol.
- Federação Paraense de Futebol.
- Federação Paranaense de Futebol.
- Federação Paulista de Futebol, the Football Federation of São Paulo state, Brazil
- Federação Pernambucana de Futebol, the Football Federation of Pernambuco, Brazil

== Other uses ==
- Faded Paper Figures, an American electronic band
- Final protective fire (Army)
- Flexible polyurethane foam
- Freedom of the Press Foundation
- Future of Privacy Forum, an American think tank
- Trade Union Propaganda League (Swedish: Fackliga propagandaförbundet), a defunct Swedish trade union
- Federal Protective Forces, the law enforcement and security agency of the United States Department of Energy
