= Key Bridge =

Key Bridge, Francis Scott Key Bridge, or FSK Bridge may refer to:

- Francis Scott Key Bridge (Baltimore), the 1977 bridge that collapsed in 2024
  - Francis Scott Key Bridge collapse
  - Francis Scott Key Bridge replacement, a project planned for completion in 2030
- Key Bridge (Washington, D.C.) in the United States
- Key Bridge (Quay Bridge), Tewkesbury, England, originally built ca. 1470 and maintained under an 1808 act of Parliament, the Key Bridge, Tewkesbury Act 1808 (48 Geo. 3. c. lxii)

== See also ==
- Keybridge, a hamlet in Blisland, Cornwall, England
