= Frontier Education Foundation =

The Frontier Education Foundation (FEF) is an organisation which overlooks and manages the promotion of education in Khyber Pakhtunkhwa, Pakistan. The body, based in Peshawar, was founded in 1992 under an Act initiated by the provincial Government of Khyber Pakhtunkhwa and lists one if its principal functions as the "promotion and development of education in private sector in Khyber Pakhtunkhwa through financial help and other measures." The FEF is headed by a managing director, and the rest of the structural organisation is centred around various administrative staff. Some of the operative areas where it is instrumental include providing scholarships, granting loans and conducting short in-service training courses for teachers of private-sector schools.
