= FCM =

The word FCM may refer to:

== Science and technology ==
- FCM (chemotherapy), a chemotherapy regimen
- Flow cytometry
- Food contact materials
- Fuel-containing material
- Flight control module, a computer that assists in the control of an aircraft

=== Computing ===
- Firebase Cloud Messaging
- Flash cache module
- FlashCopy Manager
- Flash Core Module
- Fuzzy C-means clustering, an algorithm
- Fuzzy cognitive map

== Organizations ==
- Federation of Canadian Municipalities
- First Congregational Methodist Church, a Christian denomination
- Florida Citrus Mutual, an American trade group
- Friends of Cathedral Music, a British organisation
- Mexican Railway (Spanish: Ferrocarril Mexicano)
- Société Nouvelle des Forges et Chantiers de la Méditerranée, a French shipbuilder

=== Sport ===
- 1. FC Magdeburg, a German football club
- FC Metz, a French football club
- FC Midtjylland, a Danish football club
- F.C. Mindwell, a Northern Irish football club
- FC Mulhouse, a French football club
- Moldavian Cycling Federation (Romanian: Federaţia de Ciclism a Republicii Moldova)

== Other uses ==
- Futures commission merchant
- Flying Cloud Airport (IATA and LID codes), in Eden Prairie, Minnesota, US
- Food Chain Magnate, 2015 strategy board game
