= FOH =

FOH may refer to:

- Federal Occupational Health, a US government agency
- The Fires of Heaven, a novel by Robert Jordan
- First-order hold, a mathematical model used in digital signal reconstruction
- Force of Habit, a Canadian skate-punk band
- FOH, station code for Forest Hill railway station, in London
- Formula One Holdings, a motorsport promotion company
- Fortress Hill station, in Hong Kong
- Frederick's of Hollywood, an American lingerie retailer
- Friends of Humanity, a fictional organization in the Marvel Comics universe
- Front of house, the publicly visible areas of a performance venue, restaurant, retail store, etc.
- Front of House (magazine), a live audio trade journal
- Victor Bockarie Foh (born 1946), Sierra Leonean politician
