= Forward arming and refuelling point =

NATO term for an aircraft facility

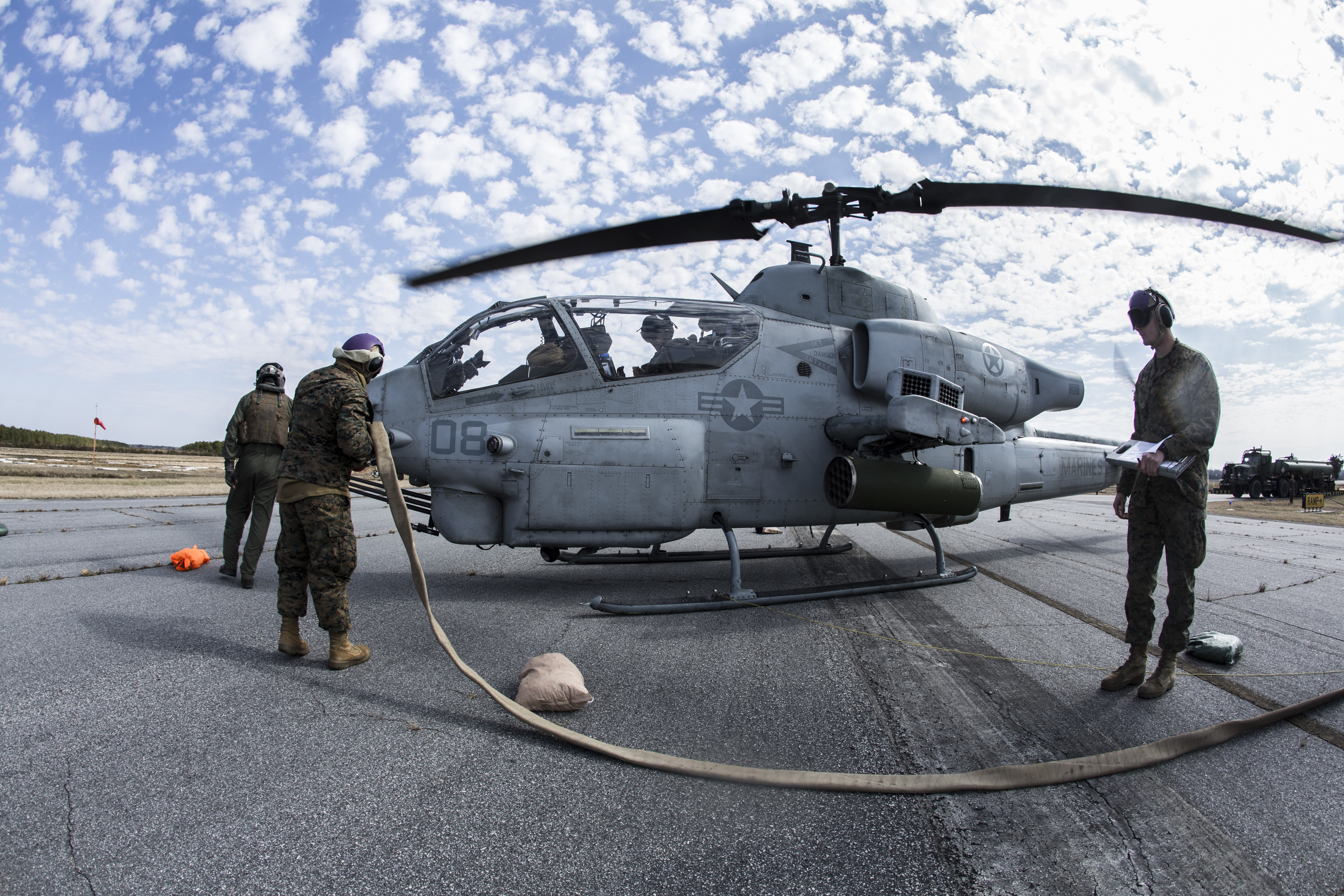
AH-1W SuperCobra being fuelled during a FARP exercise

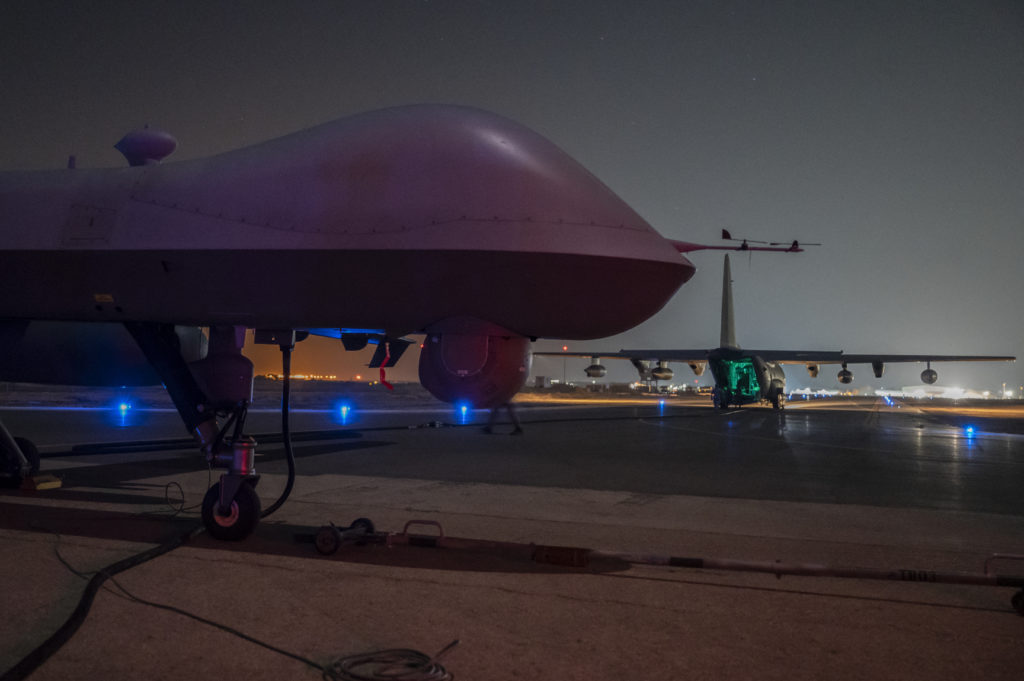
MQ-9 Reaper (UAV) at a forward area refuelling point

A forward arming and refuelling point (FARP) or forward area refuelling point is a NATO term for an area where aircraft (typically helicopters) can be refuelled and re-armed at a distance closer to their area of operations than their main operating base. This reduced distance allows faster turnaround time during sustained operations. FARPs are typically temporary, transitory facilities - particularly if the forward edge of the battle area is highly mobile, or if there is a high threat from enemy aircraft or artillery.

The US Department of Defense defines a FARP as:

A temporary facility, organized, equipped, and deployed to provide fuel and ammunition necessary for the employment of aviation maneuver units in combat.

The UK Ministry of Defence defines the FARP as:

A temporary facility organised, equipped and deployed by a Joint Helicopter Force commander to provide fuel and ammunition necessary for the employment of helicopter units. Normally located in the main battle area ahead of the Joint Helicopter Force’s normal combat service support area.

== See also ==
- Index of aviation articles
- Advance airfield
- Forward operating base
- Satellite airfield
- Naval outlying landing field
- Operation Eagle Claw
