= FP =

FP may refer to:

== Arts, media and entertainment ==
=== Music ===
- Fortepiano, an early version of the piano
- Fortepiano (musical dynamic), an Italian musical term meaning "loud soft"
- Flux Pavilion, a British dubstep artist
- Francis Poulenc (1889–1963), an early 20th century pianist and composer
  - FP (catalogue), listing his compositions
- "FP", a 2023 song by Arcángel and Rauw Alejandro, from Sentimiento, Elegancia y Más Maldad

=== Publications ===
- Financial Post, a Canadian business newspaper, part of the National Post since 1988
- Foreign Policy, a bimonthly American magazine founded in 1970

=== Other media ===
- Facepunch Studios, a British video game company
- The FP, a 2011 comedy film
- Fast Picket, a starship class in Iain Banks's The Culture universe

== Science and technology ==
=== Computing ===
- FP (complexity), in computational complexity theory, a complexity class
- FP (programming language), designed by John Backus in the 1970s
- Feature pack, a software update package to add new capabilities
- Floating point, a numerical representation system
- Frame pointer
- Microsoft FrontPage, an HTML editor
- Functional programming, a programming paradigm
- Function point, a measurement of the business functionality an information system provides

=== Transportation ===
- F-Production, or Class F, a class of race cars
- Mazda F engine, an automobile engine
- New Zealand FP class electric multiple unit (Matangi), a class of electric multiple locomotive unit
- Ford Racing, formerly Ford Performance

=== Other uses in science and technology ===
- False positive, an error in data reporting
- Ilford FP, a type of photographic film
- Fabry–Pérot interferometer, an optical device
- Fire protection, in the construction industry
- Fluoroprotein foam, a type of fire retardant foam
- Forensic psychiatry, a subspeciality of psychiatry related to criminology
- Fp dimer ("fip dimer"), a colloquial name for cyclopentadienyliron dicarbonyl dimer
- Prostaglandin F receptor, on cells

== Politics ==
- Foreign policy
- Freedom Party (disambiguation), any of several political parties
- Folkpartiet, a former name of the Liberal People's Party in Sweden
- The Federalist Papers, a series of essays advocating for the ratification of the United States Constitution
- Força Portugal, a Portuguese political alliance
- Force Publique (French for "public force"), the military force of the Belgian Congo during the colonial period
- Framework Programmes for Research and Technological Development of the European Union
- Fuerza Popular, a right-wing populist Fujimorist political party in Peru
- Virtue Party (Fazilet Partisi), an Islamist political party in Turkey

== Other uses ==
- 50 metre pistol, a shooting sport formerly known as free pistol
- Facepalm, a gesture indicating frustration
- Family planning, planning if and when to have children, often in the context of birth control
- Family practice, a medical specialty that provides health care for the individual and family
- Finance Park, an economic educational program co-managed by the Stavros Institute in Pinellas County, Florida
- First person, a grammatical person referring to the speaker
- FlyPelican, an Australian airline (IATA code FP)
- Force protection, in the US military
- French Polynesia (FIPS 10-4 country code)
- Friends Provident, a British insurance company
- Friday prayer, a congregational prayer service among Muslims
- Style Fp, a runestone style
- FP, a grade of tea leaf
- Fairphone, an electronics designer and manufacturer
