= FN =

FN may refer to:

== Arts, entertainment, and media ==
- Faking News, Indian news satire website
- Financial News, UK financial newspaper and news website
- Finding Nemo, a 2003 animated adventure comedy film by Disney and Pixar
- Fortnite, a game released in 2017 by Epic Games
- Future Nostalgia, a 2020 album by Dua Lipa

== Businesses and brands ==
- FN Herstal or Fabrique Nationale de Herstal, a Belgian arms factory
  - FN (automobile), cars produced by FN Herstal
  - FN (motorcycle), motorcycles produced by FN Herstal
- Ferrovienord, an Italian transport company (Ferrovie Nord Milano Esercizio prior to 2006)
- Royal Air Maroc Express (IATA airline designator FN)

== Organizations ==
- Front National (France) (National Front), a French Right-wing political party
- Front National (French Resistance) (National Front), a World War II French Resistance group
- Front National (Belgium) (National Front), a Belgian Far-right political party
- Fuerza Nueva, (New Force) the name of a former succession of political parties in Spain
- Futuro Nazionale (National Future) a Right-wing political party in Italy
- Forza Nuova, (New Force) a neo-fascist Italian political party

== Other uses ==
- First Nations in Canada, the predominant indigenous peoples in Canada, south of the Arctic Circle
- Fn key, a key found on some compact keyboards
- Fibronectin, a glycoprotein involved in cell adhesion and growth
- Function (computer science)
- Fireman, an enlisted rate in the United States Navy and United States Coast Guard
- Footnote, in texts
