= Fam Irvoll =

Norwegian fashion designer (born 1980)

Fam Irvoll (born 16 October 1980 in Oslo) is a Norwegian fashion designer who is known for her colorful and playful creations for women. Irvoll went to Ris School, and Hartvig Nissens school, graduating in 1999. Irvoll studied at Esmod (2005) in Oslo and Central St. Martins (2008) in London.

== Career ==
She has designed clothes for international artists such as Lady Gaga, Beyoncé, Nicki Minaj, Marina & The Diamonds, Rihanna, Pixie Geldof, Alice Delall, Katy Perry, Tyra Banks, Paloma Faith, Lily Allen, Jessie J, Spice Girls, Azealia Banks and Girls Aloud. In Norway her clothes have been used by, among others, Samsaya, Mariann Thomassen, and Charlotte Thorstvedt.

Irvoll has her own documentary show on TV2 Bliss (in Norway) called FAM. She has participated in reality shows such as Dancing with the Stars, Come Dine with Me, Kongen på haugen amongst other.

Irvoll has worked as an assistant for, among others, Vivienne Westwood (London), Gareth Pugh (London), Alexander McQueen, and Norwegian designer Peter Løchstøer. In August 2010, she showed her first collection for children.

In February 2012, Irvoll had her first solo show during London Fashion Week.
