= FF =

FF, Ff, fF or ff may refer to:

== Arts, entertainment, media ==
=== Film ===
- Logo of Finos Film, a former Greek film production company
- Fast & Furious, a media franchise centered on a series of action films that are largely concerned with illegal street racing
- Fantastic Four

=== Games ===
- Fatal Frame, a survival horror video game series
- Fatal Fury, a fighting video game series
- Final Fantasy, a role-playing video game series
- Final Fight, a beat 'em up video game series
- Fortress Forever, a mod for the first-person shooter video game Half-Life 2
- Fossil Fighters, a role-playing video game series
- Free Fire, a battle royale video game by Garena
- FusionFall, a defunct Cartoon Network-themed MMORPG

=== Literature ===
- ff – Südtiroler Wochenmagazin, an Italian weekly journal published in German language
- Fire Force, a manga series about superhero firefighters with a serialized anime adaptation
- Fantastic Four, a superhero team appearing in comic books published by Marvel Comics
- Future Foundation, a superhero team that replaced the Fantastic Four after the death of Johnny Storm, also published by Marvel Comics

=== Music ===
- Fortissimo (ff), a dynamic indicator in music for "very loud"
- Fear Factory, an American metal band
- Fleet Foxes, an American indie folk band
- Foo Fighters, an American rock band
- Franz Ferdinand (band), a Scottish rock band
- Freestyle Fellowship, an American hip hop group
- "FF", a song by Troye Sivan from She's the Best (2026)
- "F.F.", a song by Lil Uzi Vert from Red & White (2022)
- "FF / VinterNoll2", songs by Kent (2002)

=== Television ===
- Family Feud, an American syndicated game show
- Family Fortunes, a British game show based on the American version
- Freeform (TV channel), a US cable and satellite TV channel that is targeted to teens and young adults
- The Highlanders, a 1966–67 Doctor Who serial (production code "FF")

=== Other media ===
- Found footage (pseudo-documentary), a film genre in which created footage is presented as if it were discovered
- Fanfiction, unofficial writing about a work based on the work's characters and setting

== Businesses and organizations ==
- Faraday Future, a car company
- Fianna Fáil, political party in the Republic of Ireland and Northern Ireland
- Freedom Fuel, US fuel retailer
- Mukti Bahini (Freedom Fighters), armed organizations who fought against the Pakistan Army during the Bangladesh Liberation War
- Tower Air (IATA code: FF), a certificated FAR 121 schedule and charter U.S. airline that operated from 1983 until 2000

== Language ==
- ⟨ff⟩, a Latin alphabet digraph; see List of digraphs in Latin alphabets#F
- ⟨ﬀ⟩, a typographic ligature
- Word-initial ff, digraph used initially
- Fula language (ISO 639-1 code ff), a language of West Africa

== Science and technology ==
=== Computing ===
- File format, any of numerous ways to encode information on digital media
  - .ff file format, used by game developer Infinity Ward to store data securely
  - .ff file format, used by imaging technologies corporation Agfa-Gevaert to store font outline data
- Firefox, a web browser developed by Mozilla Foundation
- Flip-flop (electronics), a digital electronic circuit memory element
- Form Feed, a control character in the C0 control code set used in ASCII
- Full-frame digital SLR, a camera fitted with an image sensor equivalent in size to traditional 35 mm film
- Adobe Font Folio, an Adobe software

=== Transportation ===
- Ferrari FF, a sports car
- Jensen FF, the first non all-terrain production car equipped with 4WD and an anti-lock braking system
- Feet forwards motorcycle
- Front-engine, front-wheel-drive layout, a car designed with a front engine and front-wheel drive, colloquially known as "FF" for short
- Front freewheel, a crankset for bicycles

=== Other uses in science and technology ===
- Fast forward, forward movement through a recording faster than the speed at which it was recorded
- Femtofarad (fF), a unit of capacitance equal to 1×10^{−15} farads
- Fill factor (disambiguation), a term applied in various geometrical models and electronic devices
- Filtration fraction, in renal physiology
- Frasnian-Famennian extinction (F-F), also known as the Late Devonian extinction
- FFmpeg, a free and open source suite of video and audio encoding libraries

== Other uses ==
- 255 (number) (hexadecimal: FF_{16}), the largest numeric value possible for an unsigned byte
- ff., and the following pages (in a citation)
- FF, a bra size
- False flag, a diversionary or propaganda tactic
- Flirty fishing (FFing), evangelistic prostitution method formerly used by the Children of God
- Follow Friday, a Twitter hashtag
- FontFont, a font library owned by FontShop International
- Formula Ford, a category of formula racing cars
- Founding Fathers of the United States
- French Franc, a currency
- Frequent flyer, often abbreviated as FF# on itineraries or travel documents
- FF, a US Navy hull designation for a frigate

== See also ==
- FFS (disambiguation)
- FFF (disambiguation)
- F2 (disambiguation)
- 2F (disambiguation)
- F (disambiguation)
