= F2 =

F2, F.II or similar may refer to:

== Science and mathematics ==
- F_{2}, the chemical formula for fluorine in chemistry
- $\mathbb F_2$ or GF(2), in mathematics, the Galois field of two elements
- F2, a category in the Fujita scale of tornado intensity
- F2 hybrid, a type of crossing in classical genetics
- F2 layer, a stratum of the Earth's ionosphere
- F-2 mycotoxin or zearalenone, a chemical produced by fungi
- NIST-F2, an atomic clock

== Motorsports ==
- Formula Two, a type of open-wheel formula racing category first codified in 1948.
- FIA Formula 2 Championship, a second-tier single-seater championship held from 2009 to 2012.
- FIA Formula 2 Championship, a second-tier single-seater championship held since 2017.

== Medicine ==
- F2 or Foundation Year 2, part of the UK Foundation Programme for postgraduate medical practitioners
- F-2 (drug), a psychedelic drug
- F2-isoprostane, a compound formed in vivo from fatty acids
- F2 gene, present on human chromosome 11, encodes for thrombin

== Films ==
- F2: Fun and Frustration, a 2019 Indian Telugu language film starring Venkatesh and Varun Tej

== Technology ==
- F2, a function key on a computer keyboard
- F2 or flat twin engine, a type of two-cylinder internal combustion engine
- Anik F2, a Canadian geostationary communications satellite
- Nikon F2, a professional SLR camera

== Transportation ==
=== Aviation ===
- Fly Air, IATA designator F2, a Turkish private airline
- Fieseler F2 Tiger, a German single-seat aerobatic biplane
- Flanders F.2, a 1911 British experimental single-seat monoplane aircraft
- Fokker F.II, a 1919 German early airliner
- Metropolitan-Vickers F.2, a 1941 British early turbojet engine
- Boeing Customer Code of Turkish Airlines

=== Rail ===
- EMD F2, a class of GM diesel freight locomotive built in 1946
- H&BR Class F2, a class of 0-6-2T steam locomotives of the Hull and Barnsley Railway

=== Road ===
- Alta F2, a 1952 British racing car
- DKW F2, a 1930s German small car
- Marussia F2, a Russian large luxury car

=== Boat ===
- Taronga Zoo ferry service| in Sydney, Australia

== Military ==
=== Air ===
- Beechcraft F-2 Expeditor, an American twin engine reconnaissance aircraft
- Blackburn F.2 Lincock, a 1928 British single-seat lightweight fighter
- Bristol F.2 Fighter, a 1916 British two-seat biplane fighter and reconnaissance aircraft
- Dassault Mirage F2, a 1960s French prototype two-seat attack fighter
- Fairey F.2, a 1917 British fighter prototype
- Felixstowe F.2, a 1917 British First World War flying boat
- Hunter F 2, a 1953 Hawker Hunter fighter aircraft variant
- Lübeck-Travemünde F.2, early German reconnaissance floatplane
- McDonnell F-2 Banshee, a carrier-based jet fighter aircraft of the 1950s
- Mitsubishi F-2, a Japanese fighter aircraft, based on the F-16 Fighting Falcon
- RAF Tornado F2, a long-range, twin-engine swing-wing interceptor
- F 2 Hägernäs, a former Swedish Air Force wing

=== Sea ===
- HMS F2, an F class First World War submarine of the Royal Navy
- Italian submarine F2, an Italian Regia Marina (Royal Navy) submarine in commission from 1916 to 1929
- USS F-2 (SS-21), a 1910s F-class submarine of the United States Navy
- 20 mm modèle F2 gun, a French naval gun

=== Land ===
- F2 81mm Mortar, an Australian weapon
- FR F2 sniper rifle, the standard sniper rifle of the French military
- KMW F2, a German modular wheeled armoured vehicle

== Other uses ==
- F2 (classification), a wheelchair sport classification
- F-2 visa, a U.S. visa type for dependents of students
- F2Freestylers, British freestyle football duo also known as The F2
- F2 Logistics, Filipino logistics company
  - F2 Logistics Cargo Movers, volleyball team owned by the logistics company of the same name
- Formula Two, a type of open-wheel racing
- F2, the second formant

== See also ==
- 2F (disambiguation)
- FII (disambiguation)
- F3 (disambiguation)
- Fun and Frustration (disambiguation), Indian film series, abbreviated F2
