= Gang =

Associative criminal group

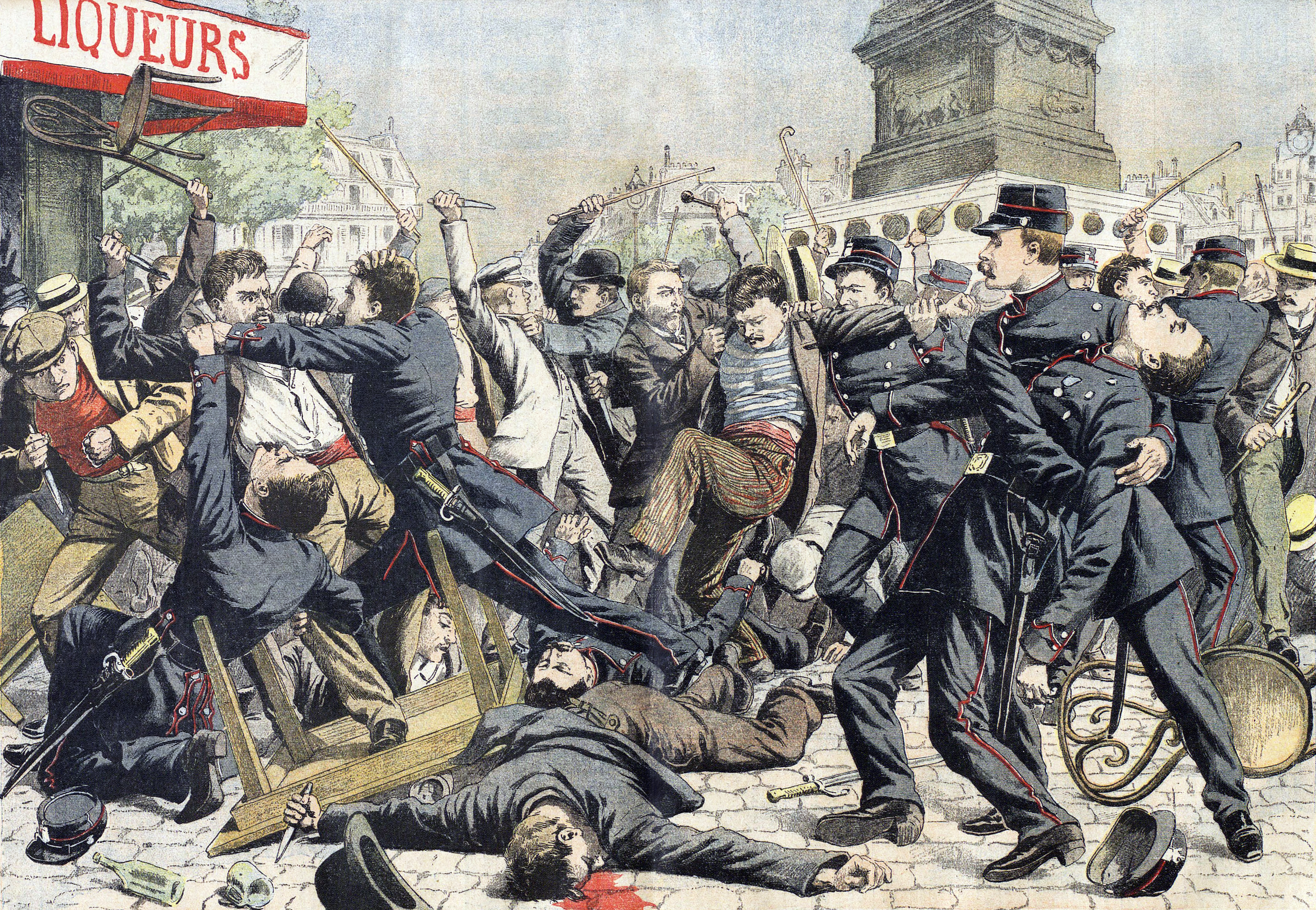
A street level rumble of Apache gang members battling Parisian Police officers en masse on 14 August 1904

A gang is a group of individuals that engage in illegal and violent behavior. Members of gangs usually encourage and glorify an aggressive and antisocial lifestyle, and many gangs are composed of individuals who were lifelong friends or relatives. Criminologists and law enforcement have varying definitions on what constitutes a gang, and the features of such groups.

== Etymology ==
The word gang derives from the past participle of Old English gan, meaning 'to go'. It is cognate with Old Norse gangr, meaning 'journey'. While the term often refers specifically to criminal groups, it also has a broader meaning of any close or organized group of people, and may have neutral, positive or negative connotations depending on usage.

== History ==
The 17th century saw London "terrorized by a series of organized gangs", some of them known as the Mims, Hectors, Bugles, and Dead Boys. These gangs often came into conflict with each other. Members dressed "with colored ribbons to distinguish the different factions." During the Victorian era, criminals and gangs started to form organizations which would collectively become London's criminal underworld. Criminal societies in the underworld started to develop their own ranks and groups which were sometimes called families, and were often made up of lower-classes and operated on pick-pocketry, prostitution, forgery and counterfeiting, commercial burglary, and money laundering schemes. Unique also were the use of slangs and argots used by Victorian criminal societies to distinguish each other, like those propagated by street gangs like the Peaky Blinders.

Gangs arose in the United States by the middle of the nineteenth century and were a concern for city leaders from the time they appeared. The emergence of the gangs was largely attributed to the vast rural population immigration to the urban areas. The first street-gang in the United States, the 40 Thieves, began around the late 1820s in New York City. The gangs in Washington D.C. had control of what is now Federal Triangle, in a region then known as Murder Bay. Organized crime in the United States first came to prominence in the Old West and historians such as Brian J. Robb and Erin H. Turner traced the first organized crime syndicates to the Coschise Cowboy Gang and the Wild Bunch. Prohibition would also cause a new boom in the emergence of gangs; Chicago for example had over 1,000 gangs in the 1920s. Following significant expansion during the late 20th and early 21st centuries, gang presence in the United States reached an estimated 1.4 million active members across approximately 33,000 gangs by 2011.

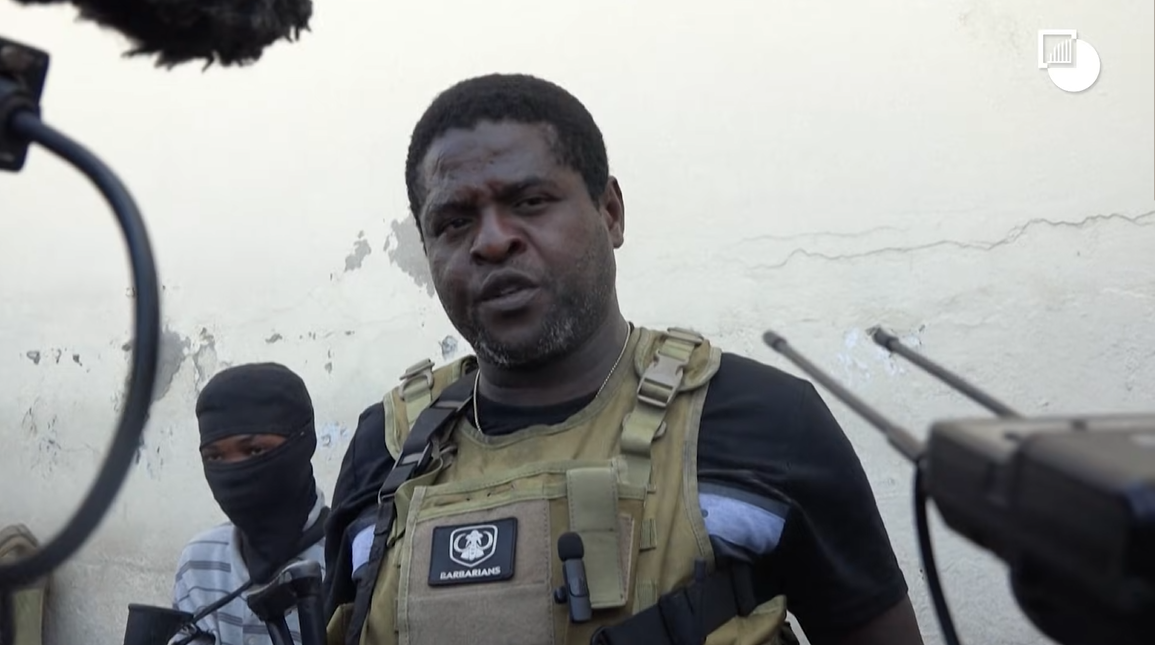
Jimmy Chérizier, leader of the Viv Ansanm gang coalition, which has exercised extensive control over parts of Port-au-Prince and other areas of Haiti.

Outside of the US and the UK, gangs exist in both urban and rural forms, like the French gangs of the Belle Époque like the Apaches and the Bonnot Gang. Many criminal organizations, such as the Italian Cosa Nostra, Japanese yakuza, Russian Bratva, and Chinese triads, have existed for centuries.

In the 2020s, gangs in Haiti expanded their territorial control, particularly in Port-au-Prince, amid the escalating Haitian conflict and Haitian crisis (2018–present). Gang activity subsequently spread into other parts of the country, with coalitions such as Viv Ansanm and groups including 400 Mawozo playing prominent roles in the violence. In response to the escalating violence, the United Nations Security Council authorized the Gang Suppression Force in 2025 to support Haitian security forces in combating the gangs and securing critical infrastructure.

In El Salvador, the criminal landscape since the late 20th century has been dominated by two major rival gangs, MS-13 and the Barrio 18. Around 2012, estimates placed the number of active gang members at approximately 60,000, operating in the vast majority of the country's municipalities. During the 2020s, El Salvador's crackdown on gangs under President Nayib Bukele influenced security policies elsewhere in Latin America. Governments and politicians in countries including Honduras, Ecuador, Chile, Colombia, Costa Rica, and Guatemala called for or adopted tougher measures against gangs modeled in part on Bukele's approach.

== Types ==
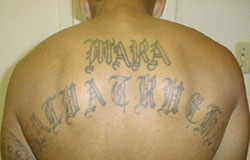
A Mara Salvatrucha gang member with a tattoo showing his gang membership

Gangs, syndicates, and other criminal groups, come in many forms, each with their own specialties and gang culture.

=== Mafia ===
One of the most infamous criminal gangs are Mafias, whose activities include racketeering and overseeing illicit agreements. These include the Sicilian Cosa Nostra and the Italian–American Mafia. The Neapolitan Camorra, the Calabrian 'Ndrangheta and the Apulian Sacra Corona Unita are similar Italian organized gangs. Outside of Italy, the Irish Mob, Japanese yakuza, Chinese triads, British firms, and Russian Bratva are also examples.

=== Narco ===
Narcos or drug cartels are slang terms used for criminal groups (mainly Latin Americans) who primarily deal with the illegal drug trade. These include drug cartels like the Medellin Cartel and other Colombian cartels, Mexican cartels like the Sinaloa Cartel and Los Zetas, and the Primeiro Comando da Capital in Brazil. Other examples are Jamaican Yardies and the various opium barons in the Golden Triangle and Golden Crescent. Many narcos are known for their use of paramilitaries and narcoterrorism like the Gulf Cartel and Shower Posse.

=== Street ===
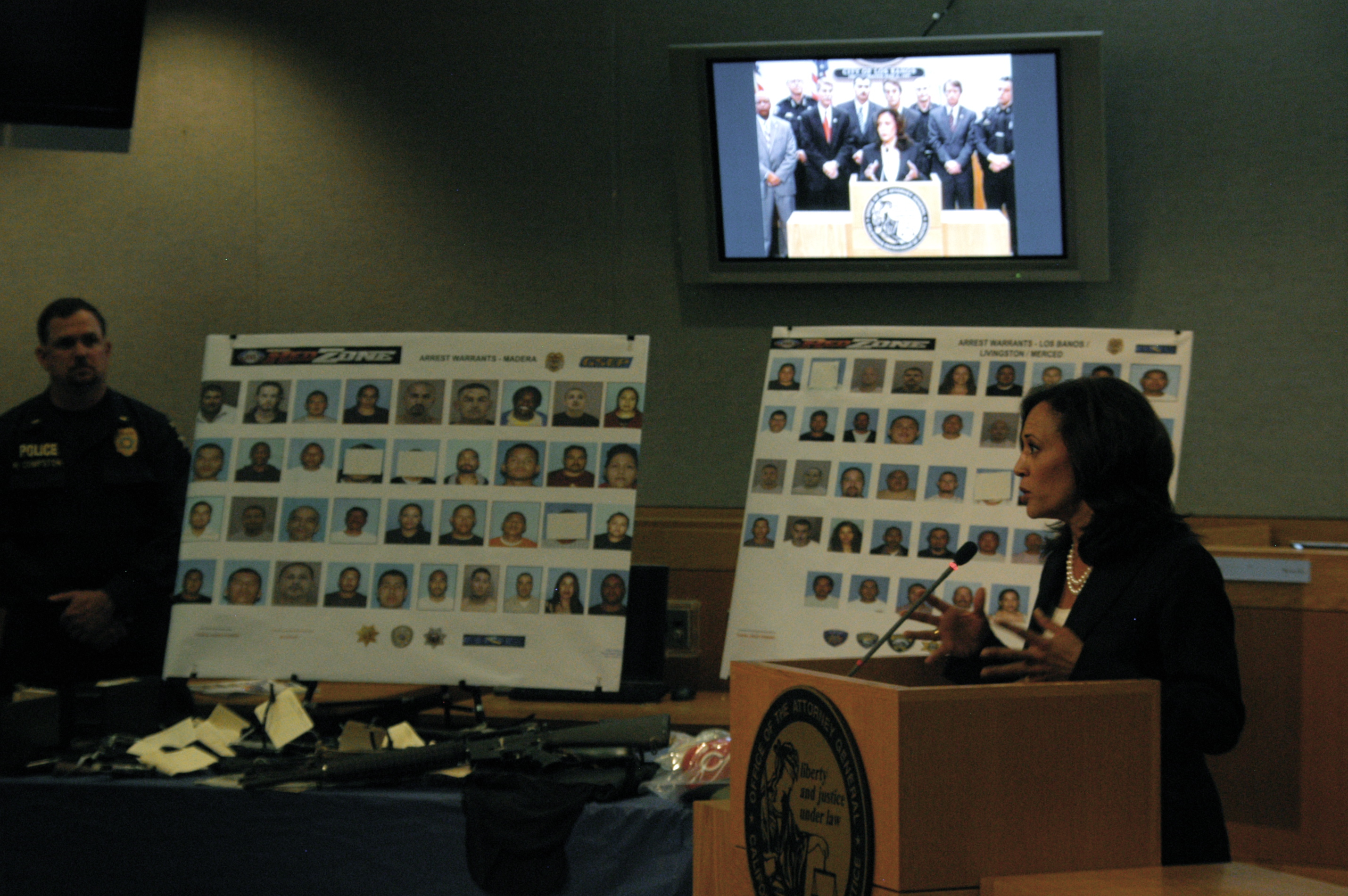
California Attorney General Kamala Harris announced the arrest of 101 gang members on 8 June 2011.

Street gangs are gangs formed by youths in urban areas, and are known primarily for street fighting and gang warfare. The term "street gang" is commonly used interchangeably with "youth gang", referring to neighborhood or street-based youth groups that meet "gang" criteria. Miller (1992) defines a street gang as "a self-formed association of peers, united by mutual interests, with identifiable leadership and internal organization, who act collectively or as individuals to achieve specific purposes, including the conduct of illegal activity and control of a particular territory, facility, or enterprise." Some of the well-known ones are the Black gangs like the Bloods and the Crips, also the Vice Lords and the Gangster Disciples. Other racial gangs also exist like the Trinitario, Sureños, Tiny Rascal Gang, Asian Boyz, Wa Ching, Zoe Pound, the Latin Kings, the Hammerskins, Nazi Lowriders, and Blood & Honour.

=== Law enforcement ===
Law enforcement gangs are criminal organizations that form and operate within law enforcement agencies. Members have been accused of significant department abuses of policy and constitutional rights, terrifying the general population, intimidating their colleagues, and retaliating against whistleblowers. Leaders called "shot-callers" control many aspects of local policing, including promotions, scheduling, and enforcement. They operate in the gray areas of law enforcement, perpetuate a culture of silence, and promote a mentality of punisher-style retaliation.

=== Biker ===
Biker gangs are motorcycle clubs who conduct illegal activities like the Hells Angels, the Pagans, the Outlaws, and the Bandidos, known as the "Big Four" in the United States. The U.S. Department of Justice defines outlaw motorcycle gangs (OMG) as "organizations whose members use their motorcycle clubs as conduits for criminal enterprises". Some clubs are considered "outlaw" not necessarily because they engage in criminal activity, but because they are not sanctioned by the American Motorcyclist Association and do not adhere to its rules. Instead the clubs have their own set of bylaws reflecting the outlaw biker culture.

Biker gangs such as the Rebels Motorcycle Club exist in Australia.

=== Prison ===
Prison gangs are formed inside prisons and correctional facilities for mutual protection and entrancement like the Mexican Mafia and United Blood Nation. Prison gangs often have several "affiliates" or "chapters" in different state prison systems that branch out due to the movement or transfer of their members. According to criminal justice professor John Hagedorn, many of the biggest gangs from Chicago originated from prisons. From the St. Charles Illinois Youth Center originated the Conservative Vice Lords and Blackstone Rangers. Although the majority of gang leaders from Chicago are now incarcerated, most of those leaders continue to manage their gangs from within prison.

=== Punk ===
Punk gangs are a unique type of gang made up of members who follow the punk rock ideology. Unlike other gangs and criminal groups, punk gangs follow a range of political and philosophical beliefs that can range from alt-right to radical left. Differing ideologies are one of the causes of conflicts between rival punk gangs, compared to other street gangs and criminal groups who wage gang war solely for illegal profit, vendetta, and territory. Most of them can be seen in political and social protests and demonstrations and are sometimes in violent confrontation with law-enforcement. Examples of punk gangs are Fight For Freedom, Friends Stand United, and Straight Edge gangs.

=== Vigilante ===
Contemporary organized crime has also led to the creation of anti-gang groups, vigilante gangs, and autodefensas, who are groups who profess to be fighting against gang influence, but share characteristics and acts similarly to a gang. These include groups like the Los Pepes, Sombra Negra, Friends Stand United, People Against Gangsterism and Drugs, and OG Imba.

== Structure ==
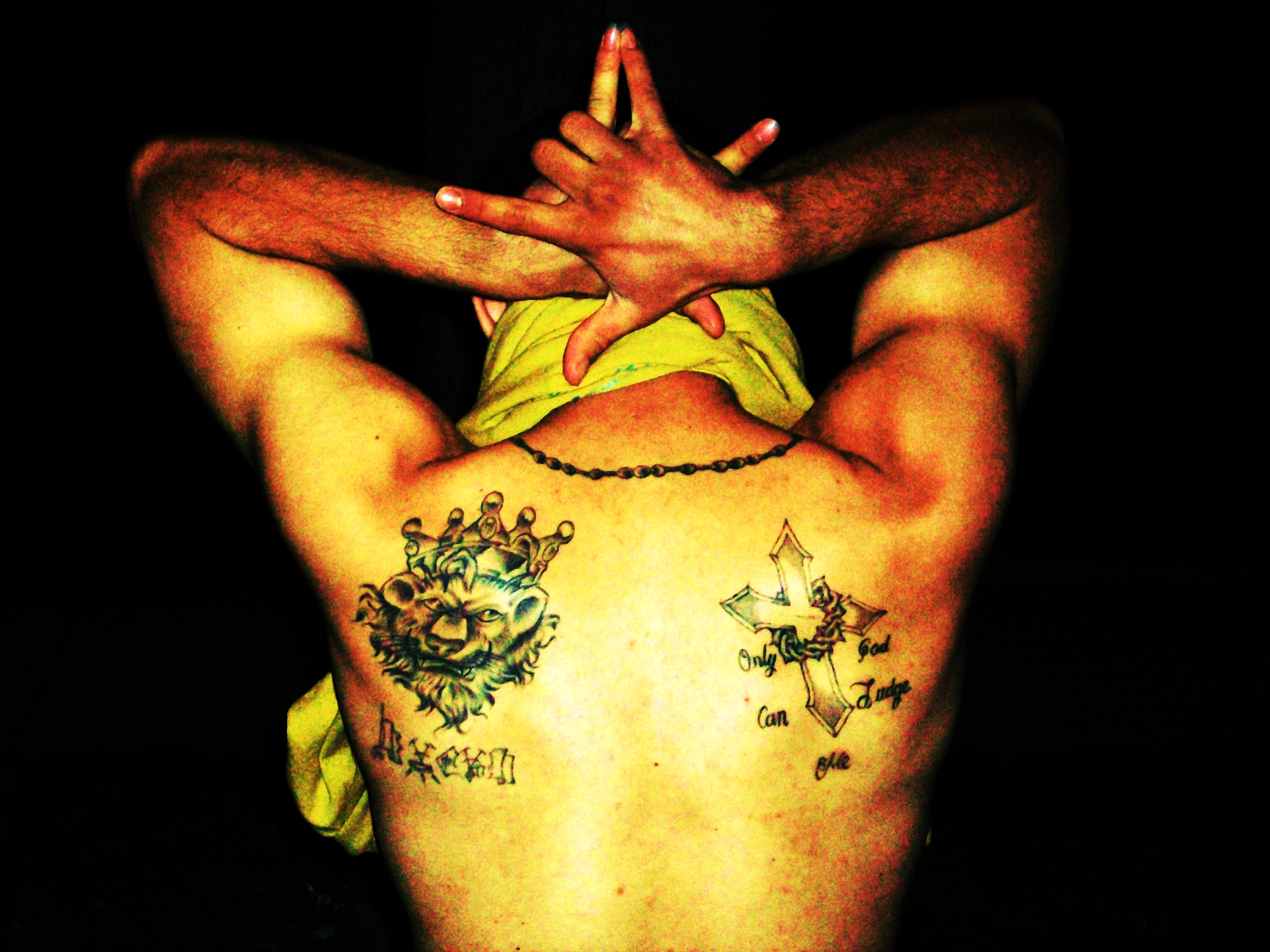
Latin King gang member showing his gang tattoo, a lion with a crown, and signifying the 5 point star with his hands

Many types of gangs make up the general structure of an organized group. Understanding the structure of gangs is a critical skill to defining the types of strategies that are most effective with dealing with them, from the at-risk youth to the gang leaders. Not all individuals who display the outward signs of gang membership are actually involved in criminal activities. An individual's age, sexual identity, physical structure, ability to fight, willingness to commit violence, and arrest record are often principal factors in determining where an individual stands in the gang hierarchy; how money derived from criminal activity and ability to provide for the gang also impacts the individual's status within the gang. The structure of gangs varies depending primarily on size, which can range from five or ten to thousands. Many of the larger gangs break up into smaller groups, cliques or sub-sets (these smaller groups can be called "sets" in gang slang.) The cliques typically bring more territory to a gang as they expand and recruit new members. Most gangs operate informally with leadership falling to whoever takes control; others have distinct leadership and are highly structured, which resembles more or less a business or corporation.

Criminal gangs may function both inside and outside of prison, such as the Nuestra Familia, Mexican Mafia, Folk Nation, and the Brazilian PCC. During the 1970s, prison gangs in Cape Town, South Africa began recruiting street gang members from outside and helped increase associations between prison and street gangs. In the US, the prison gang the Aryan Brotherhood is involved in organized crime outside of prison.

== Membership ==
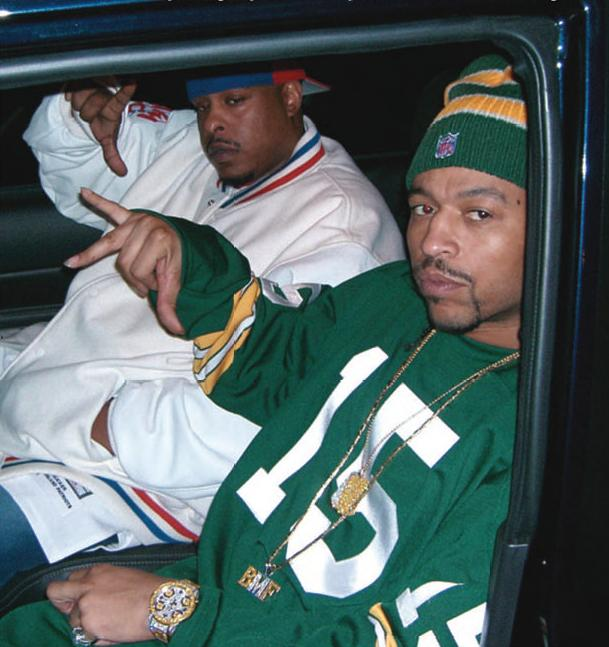
Black Mafia Family leaders in 2004

Different gangs and criminal syndicates have various roles and members. Most are typically divided into:

- Boss: known in some groups as leader, elder, don, oyabun, or original gangster, is the one who has control over the movement, plans, and actions of a gang. Gang leaders are the upper echelons of the gang's command. Often, they distance themselves from the gang activities and make attempts to appear legitimate, possibly operating a business that they run as a front for the gang's drug dealing or other illegal operations.
- Underboss: the second in command of the gang.
- Captain: the one who issues commands from the boss or underboss to the gangsters. The captain is responsible for the activities in the field and for recruiting new members.
- Gangsters: also known as soldiers, soldatos, or kobun, are the typical gang members who commit the activities of the gang.
- Associates: known also as gang affiliates or hang-arounds, are people who are not full members of the gang, but either support and participate in the activities of a gang, or have livelihoods tied to gang activities. Included here are specialized roles like enforcers (hitmen who work for criminal organizations), falcons ("eyes and ears" of the streets), and mules (smugglers who transport drugs, money, and other contraband materials).

The numerous push factors experienced by at-risk individuals vary situationally, but follow a common theme of the desire for power, respect, money, and protection. In neighborhoods with high levels of violence, adolescents typically experience pressure to join a street gang for protection from other violent actors (sometimes including police violence and the waging of the war on drugs), perpetuating a cycle of violence. These desires are very influential in attracting individuals to join gangs, and their influence is particularly strong on at-risk youth. Such individuals are often experiencing low levels of these various factors in their own lives, feeling ostracized from their community and lacking social support. Joining a gang may appear to them to be the only way to obtain status and material success or escape a cycle of poverty through profits from illegal activity. They may feel that "if you can't beat 'em, join 'em". Upon joining a gang, they instantly gain a feeling of belonging and identity; they are surrounded with individuals whom they can relate to. They have generally grown up in the same area as one another and can bond over similar needs. In some areas, joining a gang is an integrated part of the growing-up process.

Gang membership is generally maintained by gangs as a lifetime commitment, reinforced through identification such as tattoos, and ensured through intimidation and coercion. Gang defectors are often subject to retaliation from the deserted gang. Many gangs, including foreign and transnational gangs, hold that the only way to leave the gang is through death. This is sometimes informally called the "morgue rule".

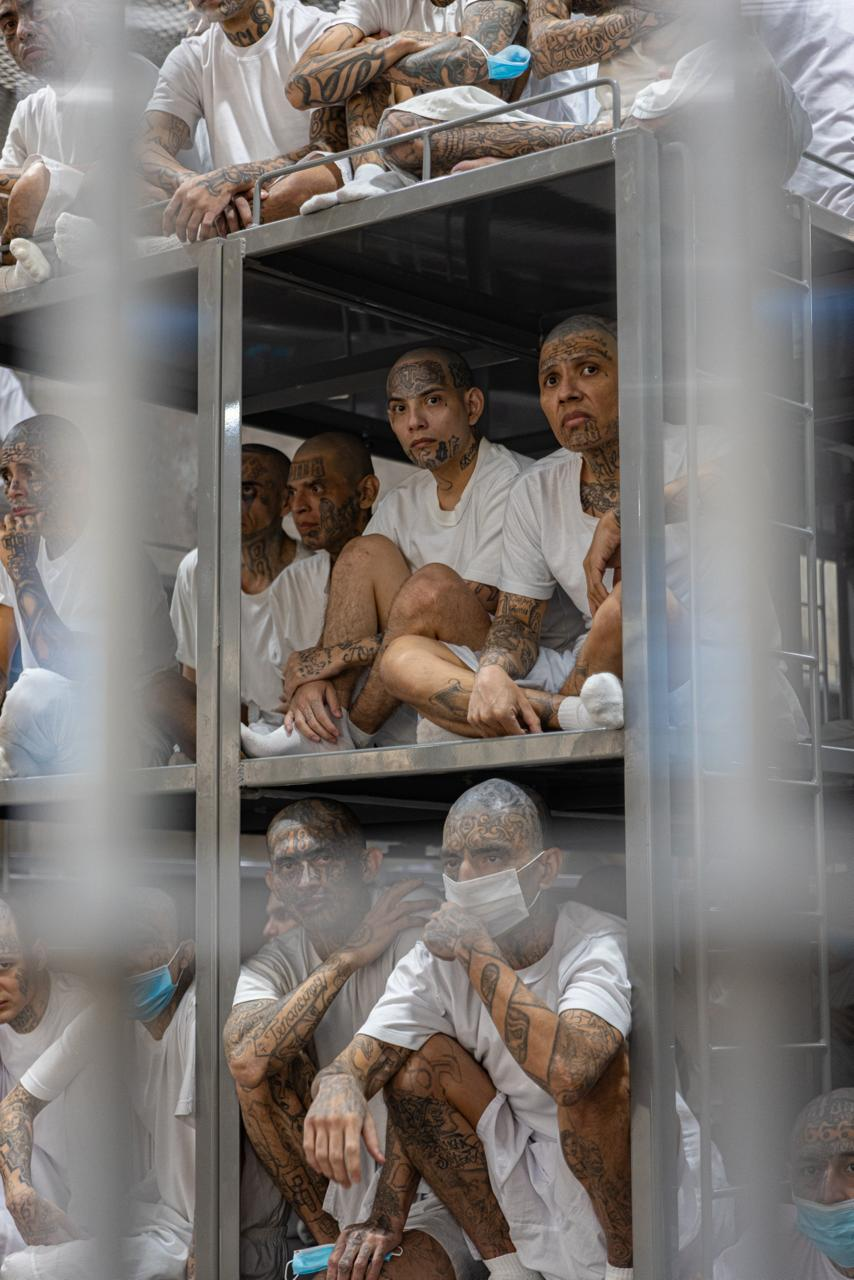
The CECOT prison, constructed in late 2022 during a large-scale gang crackdown in El Salvador

Gang membership represents the phenomenon of a chronic group criminal spin; accordingly, the criminality of members is greater when they belong to the gang than when they are not in the gang—either before or after being in the gang. In addition, when together, the gang criminality as a whole is greater than that of its members when they are alone. The gang operates as a whole greater than its parts and influences the behavior of its members in the direction of greater extend and stronger degree of criminality.

Some states have a formal process to establish that a person is a member of a gang, called validation. Once a person is validated as a gang member, the person is subject to increased sentences, harsher punishments (such as solitary confinement) and more restrictive parole rules. To validate a person as a gang member, the officials generally must provide evidence of several factors, such as tattoos, photographs, admissions, clothing, etc. The legal requirements for validating a person are much lower than the requirements for convicting of a crime.

=== Non-member women ===
Women associated with gangs but who lack membership are typically categorized based on their relation to gang members. A survey of Mexican American gang members and associates defined these categories as girlfriends, hoodrats, good girls, and relatives. Girlfriends are long-term partners of male gang members, and may have children with them. "Hoodrats" are seen as being promiscuous and heavy drug and alcohol users. Gang members may engage in casual sex with these girls, but they are not viewed as potential long-term partners and are severely stigmatized by both men and women in gang culture. "Good girls" are long-term friends of members, often from childhood, and relatives are typically sisters or cousins. These are fluid categories, and women often change status as they move between them. Valdez found that women with ties to gang members are often used to hold illegal weapons and drugs, typically, because members believe the girls are less likely to be searched by police for such items.

=== Initiation ===
Different gangs from around the world have their way of recruiting and introducing new members. Most criminal gangs require an interested candidate to commit a crime to be inducted into a gang. Many street gangs, like the Bloods and MS-13, have a ritual where they would beat up (also known as "beat-in" or "jump-in") aspiring applicants for several seconds to show their toughness, willingness, and loyalty. Some of these gangs allow women to become members either through being jumped-in or having sex with male members (known as "sexed-in").

Biker gangs like the Hells Angels require a candidate, known as a "hang-around", to be observed and mentored by veteran gang members (which can last a year or more) in order to assess their personalities and commitment. The Cosa Nostra requires people wanting to be full members or become made men to take part in a ceremony involving oaths, agreement, and bloodletting to show their loyalty. The Sigue-Sigue Sputnik from the Philippines require gang members to tattoo (or "tatak") the name of the gang or their leader into their body. Triads have a more unique way of initiating associates into full members. Triad ceremonies take place at an altar dedicated to Guan Yu, with incense and an animal sacrifice (usually a chicken, pig or goat).

=== Training ===
Training and expertise in various forms of illicit activities, including combat, exist variously throughout different gangs. Specific members of American mafia groups, like police infiltrators, double agents, and sometimes also enforcers and hitmen, have had backgrounds in law enforcement or the military. Sicilian mafia and Calabrian Mafia in Southern Italy became notorious for creating "schools" in the countryside to train children as young as eleven in weapons and illegal activities. Giovanni Tinebra, the chief public prosecutor of Caltanissetta, once stated, "Instead of going to school, many boys go into the countryside where there are people who teach them to shoot and turn them into killing machines."

Some drug cartels in Colombia and Mexico have established themselves as paramilitaries. The earliest and most famous example was the time when the Medellin Cartel hired Israeli soldier Yair Klein to train militiamen and assassins. Los Zetas became infamous for being founded by US-trained Mexican commandos. Together with Kaibiles from Guatemala, they set up camps to train future sicarios and soldatos. Other Mexican cartels who trained their members include the Jalisco Cartel, who trained their members for three months in ambushes, codes of silence and discipline, inside camps.

In the case of street gangs, most do not train their members in shooting and combat. Although a few would train their youths how to shoot using empty cans and bottles as targets (with some cases using underground shooting ranges), most gangsters have no formal instructions in firearms usage and safety. The late 90s and early 2000s saw many gang members in the US being sent by judges to the military to "set them on the right path", which only led to these street gangs gaining military training and experience. Many street gangs, most notably African-American gangs like the Folk Nation and Bloods, continue to have a presence in the US Military.

== Typical activities ==
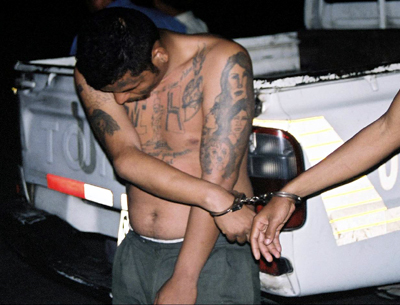
Mara Salvatrucha suspect bearing gang tattoos is handcuffed. In 2004, the FBI created the MS-13 National Gang Task Force to combat gang activity in the United States. A year later, the FBI helped create National Gang Intelligence Center.

The United Nations estimates that gangs make most of their money through the drugs trade, which is thought to be worth $352 billion in total. The United States Department of Justice estimates there are approximately 30,000 gangs, with 760,000 members, impacting 2,500 communities across the United States.

Gangs are involved in all areas of street-crime activities like extortion, drug trafficking, both in and outside the prison system, and theft. Gangs also victimize individuals by robbery and kidnapping. Cocaine is the primary drug of distribution by gangs in America, which have used the cities Chicago, Cape Town, and Rio de Janeiro to transport drugs internationally. Brazilian urbanization has driven the drug trade to the favelas of Rio. Often, gangs hire "lookouts" to warn members of upcoming law enforcement. The dense environments of favelas in Rio and public housing projects in Chicago have helped gang members hide from police easily.

Street gangs take over territory or "turf" in a particular city and are often involved in "providing protection", often a thin cover for extortion, as the "protection" is usually from the gang itself, or in other criminal activity. Many gangs use fronts to demonstrate influence and gain revenue in a particular area.

== Violence ==
Latin Kings graffiti

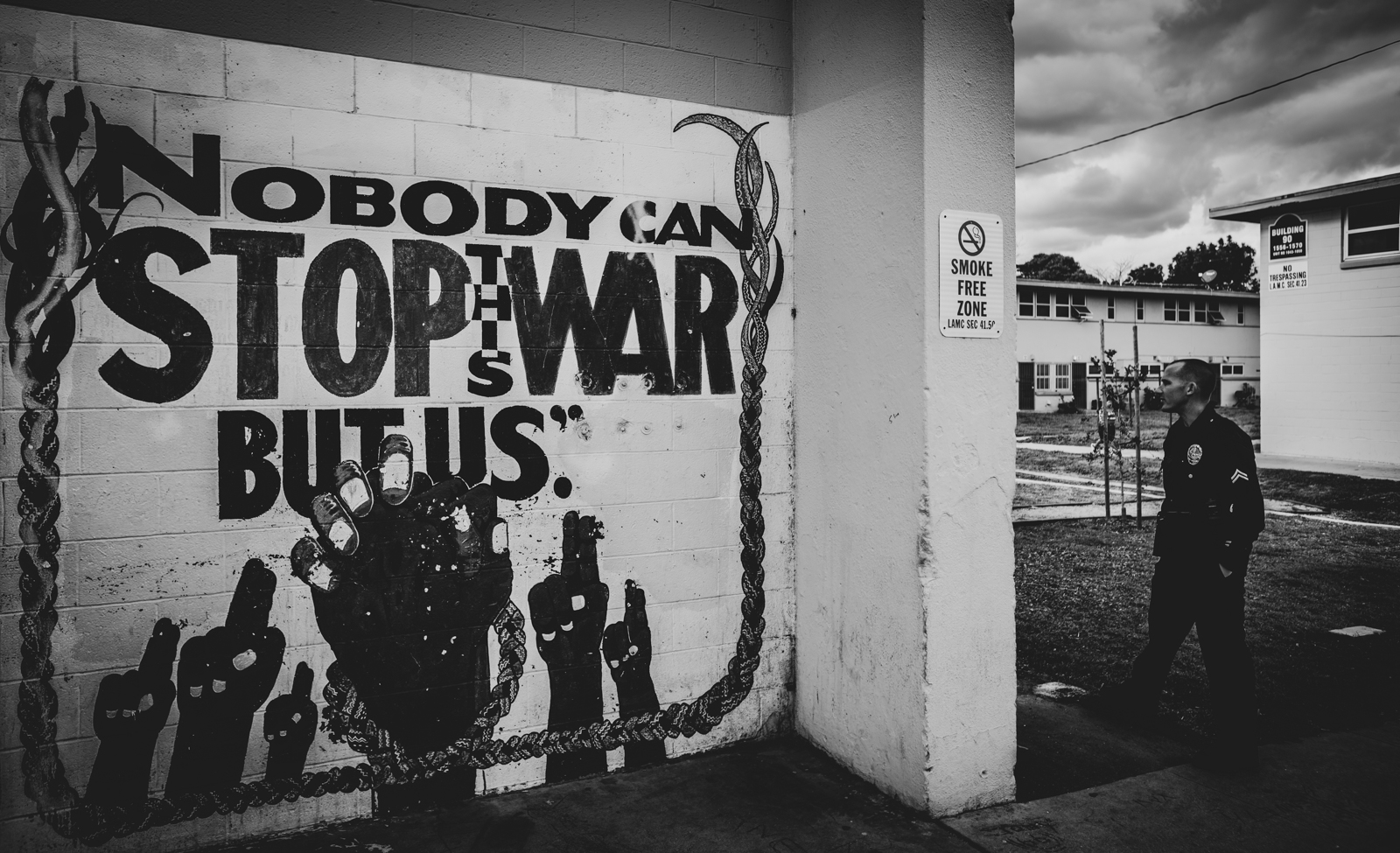
A mural referencing the Crips–Bloods gang war in Watts' Nickerson Gardens housing project, pictured in 2019

Gang violence refers mostly to the illegal and non-political acts of violence perpetrated by gangs against civilians, other gangs, law enforcement officers, firefighters, or military personnel. A gang war is a type of small war that occurs when two gangs end up in a feud over territory or vendetta. Gang warfare mostly consists of sanctioned and unsanctioned hits, street fighting, and gun violence.

Modern gangs introduced new acts of violence, which may also function as a rite of passage for new gang members. In 2006, 58 percent of L.A.'s murders were gang-related. Reports of gang-related homicides are concentrated mostly in the largest cities in the United States, where there are long-standing and persistent gang problems and a greater number of documented gang members—most of whom are identified by law enforcement. Gang-related activity and violence has increased along the U.S. Southwest border region, as US-based gangs act as enforcers for Mexican drug cartels.

=== Schools ===
Despite gangs usually formed in the community, not specifically in schools, gang violence can potentially affect schools in different ways including:

- Gangs can recruit members in schools;
- Gang members from the same school can engage in violence on the school premises or around their school;
- Gang members from the same school can commit violence against other students in the same school who belong to a different gang or who do not belong to a gang;
- Gangs may commit violence against other schools and students in the community where they are active, even if these students do not belong to a gang.

Global data on the prevalence of these different forms of gang violence in and around schools is limited. Some evidence suggests that gang violence is more common in schools where students are exposed to other forms of community violence and where they fear violence at school.

Children who grow up in neighbourhoods with high levels of crime has been identified as a risk factor for youth violence, including gang violence. According to studies, children who knew many adult criminals were more likely to engage in violent behaviour by the age of 18 years than those who did not.

Gang violence is often associated with carrying weapons, including in school. A study of 10-to-19-year-olds in the UK found that 44% of those who reported belonging to a delinquent youth group had committed violence and 13% had carried a knife in the previous 12 months versus 17% and 4% respectively among those who were not in such a group.

According to a meta-analysis of 14 countries in North America, Europe, the Middle East, Central and South America, sub-Saharan Africa and the Pacific also showed that carrying a weapon at school is associated with bullying victimization.

Comparison of Global School-based Student Health Survey (GSHS) data on school violence and bullying for countries that are particularly affected by gang violence suggests that the links may be limited. In El Salvador and Guatemala, for example, where gang violence is a serious problem, GSHS data show that the prevalence of bullying, physical fights and physical attacks reported by school students is relatively low, and is similar to prevalence in other countries in Central America where gang violence is less prevalent.

=== Sexual violence ===
Women in gang culture are often in environments where sexual assault is common and considered to be a norm. Women who attend social gatherings and parties with heavy drug and alcohol use are particularly likely to be assaulted. A girl who becomes intoxicated and flirts with men is often seen as "asking for it" and is written off as a "hoe" by men and women. "Hoodrats" and girls associated with rival gangs have lower status at these social events, and are victimized when members view them as fair game and other women rationalize assault against them.

== Motives ==
Most modern research on gangs has focused on the thesis of class struggle following the work of Walter B. Miller and Irving Spergel. In this body of work The Gaylords are cited as the prime example of an American gang that is neither black nor Hispanic. Some researchers have focused on ethnic factors. Frederic Thrasher, who was a pioneer of gang research, identified "demoralization" as a standard characteristic of gangs. John Hagedorn has argued that this is one of three concepts that shed light on patterns of organization in oppressed racial, religious and ethnic groups (the other two are Manuel Castells' theory of "resistance identity" and Derrick Bell's work on the permanence of racism).

Usually, gangs have gained the most control in poorer, urban communities and developing countries in response to unemployment and other services. Social disorganization, and the disintegration of societal institutions such as family, school, and the public safety net, enable groups of peers to form gangs. According to surveys conducted internationally by the World Bank for their World Development Report 2011, by far the most common reason people suggest as a motive for joining gangs is unemployment.

Ethnic solidarity is a common factor in gangs. Black and Hispanic gangs formed during the 1960s in the USA often adapted nationalist rhetoric. Both majority and minority races in society have established gangs in the name of identity: the Igbo gang Bakassi Boys in Nigeria defend the majority Igbo group violently and through terror, and in the United States, whites who feel threatened by minorities have formed their own gangs, such as the Ku Klux Klan. Responding to an increasing black and Hispanic migration, a white gang formed called Chicago Gaylords. Some gang members are motivated by religion, as is the case with the Muslim Patrol and the Epstein-Wolmark gang.

== Identification ==
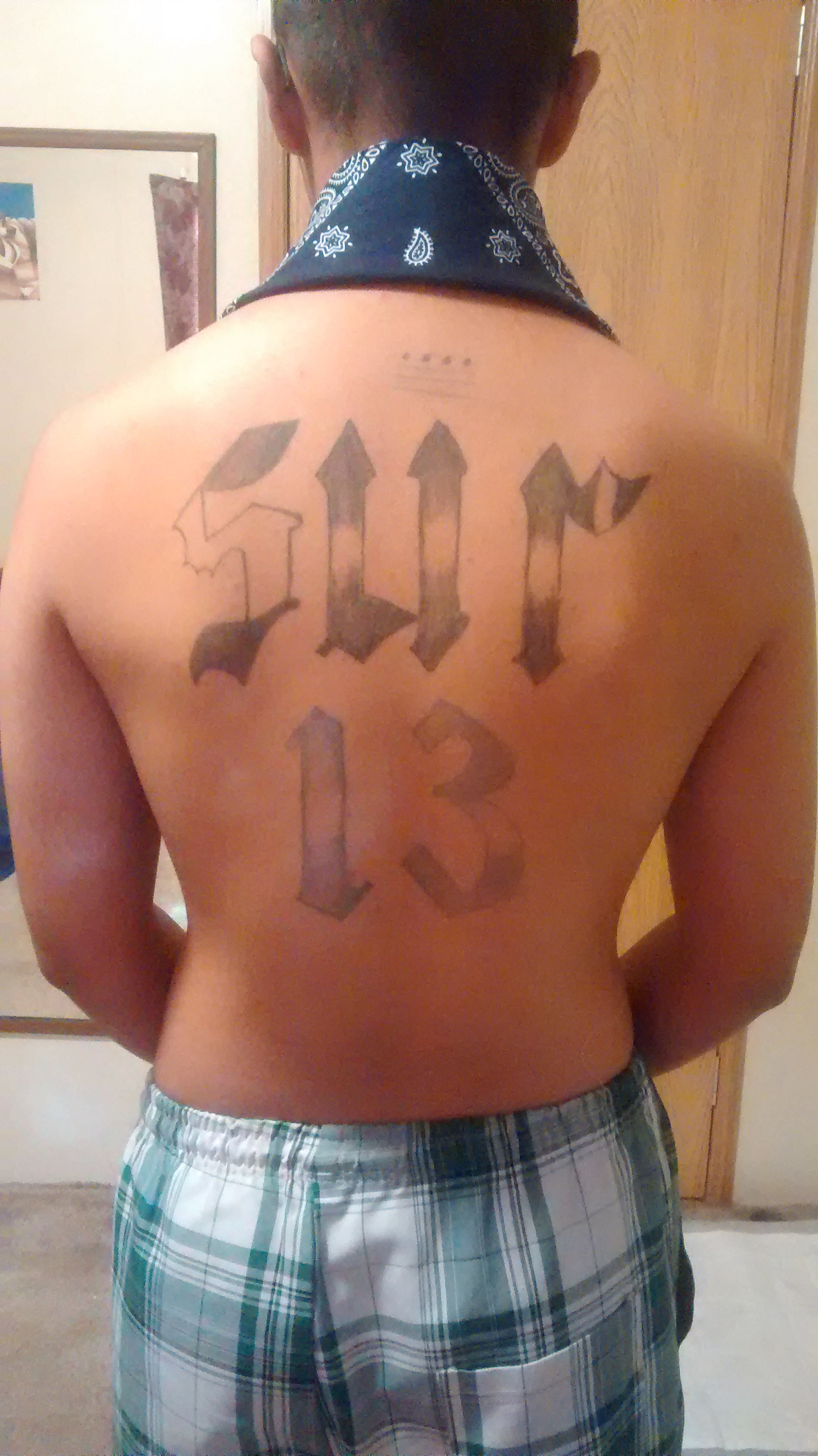
A Sureño gang tattoo

Most gang members have identifying characteristics which are unique to their specific clique or gang. The Bloods, for instance, wear red bandanas, the Crips blue, allowing these gangs to "represent" their affiliation. Any disrespect of a gang member's color by an unaffiliated individual is regarded as grounds for violent retaliation, often by multiple members of the offended gang. Tattoos are also common identifiers, such as an '18' above the eyebrow to identify a member of the 18th Street gang. Tattoos help a gang member gain respect within their group, and mark them as members for life. Tattoos can also represent the level they are in the gang, being that certain tattoos can mean they are a more accomplished member. The accomplishments can be related to doing a dangerous act that showed your loyalty to the gang. They can be burned on as well as inked. Some gangs make use of more than one identifier, like the Nortenos, who wear red bandanas and have "14", "XIV", "x4", and "Norte" tattoos. Some members of criminal gangs are "jumped in" (by going through a process of initiation), or have to prove their loyalty and right to belong by committing certain acts, usually theft or violence.

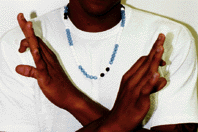
A member of the Crips showing a gang signal

Gangs often establish distinctive, characteristic identifiers including graffiti tags colors, hand signals, clothing (for example, the gangsta rap-type hoodies), jewelry, hair styles, fingernails, slogans, signs (such as the noose and the burning cross as the symbols of the Klan), flags secret greetings, slurs, or code words and other group-specific symbols associated with the gang's common beliefs, rituals, and mythologies to define and differentiate themselves from other groups and gangs.

As an alternative language, hand-signals, symbols, and slurs in speech, graffiti, print, music, or other mediums communicate specific informational cues used to threaten, disparage, taunt, harass, intimidate, alarm, influence, or exact specific responses including obedience, submission, fear, or terror. One study focused on terrorism and symbols states that "[s]ymbolism is important because it plays a part in impelling the terrorist to act and then in defining the targets of their actions." Displaying a gang sign, such as the noose, as a symbolic act can be construed as "a threat to commit violence communicated with the intent to terrorize another, to cause evacuation of a building, or to cause serious public inconvenience, in reckless disregard of the risk of causing such terror or inconvenience … an offense against property or involving danger to another person that may include but is not limited to recklessly endangering another person, harassment, stalking, ethnic intimidation, and criminal mischief."

The Internet is one of the most significant media used by gangs to communicate in terms of the size of the audience they can reach with minimal effort and reduced risk. Social media provides a forum for recruitment activities, typically provoking rival gangs through derogatory postings, and to glorify their gang and themselves.

== US impact debate ==
Researchers and activists in the United States have debated the true impact of US gangs on crime in the United States, with a 2019 episode of the You're Wrong About podcast claiming that the perceived increase in gang violence was in fact an overblown moral panic. There have been repeated complaints of bias around the enforcement of gang-related laws asking why Frats and Gangs are treated differently "They're both blamed for predisposing their members to violent acts, but they've sparked radically different public-policy responses."

Activists have also made the link between a perceived increase in gang activity and the sharp rise in US police budgets while pointing out rampant corruption in police gang units, such as the Rampart scandal in the Los Angeles Police Department.

== UK impact debate ==
In the UK context, law enforcement agencies are increasingly focusing enforcement efforts on gangs and gang membership. Debate persists over the extent and nature of gang activity in the UK,

The Runnymede Trust suggests, despite the well-rehearsed public discourse around youth gangs and gang culture, "We actually know very little about 'gangs' in the UK: about how 'a gang' might be defined or understood, about what being in 'a gang' means ... We know still less about how 'the gang' links to levels of youth violence."

== United States military ==
Gang members in uniform use their military knowledge, skills and weapons to commit and facilitate various crimes. As of April 2011, the NGIC has identified members of at least 53 gangs whose members have served in or are affiliated with US military.

In 2006, Scott Barfield, a Defense Department investigator, said there is an online network of gangs and extremists: "They're communicating with each other about weapons, about recruiting, about keeping their identities secret, about organizing within the military."

A 2006 Chicago Sun-Times article reported that gangs encourage members to enter the military to learn urban warfare techniques to teach other gang members. A January 2007 article in the Chicago Sun-Times reported that gang members in the military are involved in the theft and sale of military weapons, ammunition, and equipment, including body armor. The Sun-Times began investigating the gang activity in the military after receiving photos of gang graffiti showing up in Iraq.

The FBI's 2007 report on gang membership in the military states that the military's recruit screening process is ineffective, allows gang members/extremists to enter the military, and lists at least eight instances in the last three years in which gang members have obtained military weapons for their illegal enterprises. "Gang Activity in the U.S. Armed Forces Increasing", dated 12 January 2007, states that street gangs including the Bloods, Crips, Black Disciples, Gangster Disciples, Hells Angels, Latin Kings, The 18th Street Gang, Mara Salvatrucha (MS-13), Mexican Mafia, Norteños, Sureños, and Vice Lords have been documented on military installations both domestic and international although recruiting gang members violates military regulations.

== See also ==
- Criminal tattoo
- Drug cartel
- Gang population
- Gangs in Australia
- Gangs in Canada
- Gangs in New Zealand
- Gangs in South Africa
- Gangs in the United Kingdom
- Gangs in the United States
- List of criminal enterprises, gangs, and syndicates
- List of criminal gangs in Brazil
- List of criminal gangs in Mexico
- List of known gang members
- Organized crime
- Outlaw motorcycle club
- Raskol gangs
- Triad (organized crime)
- War on Gangs

== General and cited references ==
- Collins, Angela M., Scott Menard and David Pyrooz. 2018. "Collective Behavior and the Generality of Integrated Theory: A National Study of Gang Fighting". Deviant Behavior 39(8):992–1005. doi:10.1080/01639625.2017.1395664.
- Hagedorn, John M. (2008), A World of Gangs: Armed Young Men and Gangsta Culture, Minneapolis: University of Minnesota Press, ISBN 978-0816650668
- O'Deane, Matthew D. (2010), Gangs: Theory, Practice and Research, San Clemente, CA: Lawtechcustompublishing.com, ISBN 978-1933778198, archived from the original on 5 March 2016

Attribution

- This article incorporates text from a free content work. Licensed under CC BY-SA 3.0 IGO. Text taken from Behind the numbers: ending school violence and bullying, 70. UNESCO.
