= FFF =

FFF may refer to:

== Arts and entertainment ==
=== Film festivals ===
- Fantasy Filmfest, annual genre film festival in Germany
- Fashion in Film Festival, a biennial festival in London and New York City
- FreedomFilmFest, an annual documentary film festival in Malaysia
- Lund International Fantastic Film Festival, a fantastique film festival in Sweden

=== Music ===
- Fun Fun Fun Fest, an annual music festival held in Austin, Texas
- "FFF", a song from the album Cryptic Writings by American thrash metal band Megadeth
- "FFF", a song from the album Album by Public Image Ltd
- "FFF", a song from the album Född förlorare by Swedish black metal group Shining
- "FFF", a song from the album Poster Girl by Swedish singer Zara Larsson
- "F.F.F.", a song from the EP All Your Fault: Pt. 1 by American singer Bebe Rexha
- fff, in music dynamics, forte fortissimo or fortississimo—as loud as can be played
- F.F.F. (musical), a 1920 Australian musical comedy

=== Television ===
- The Mind of Evil, a 1971 Doctor Who serial (production code "FFF")
- Family Food Fight (Australian TV series), a cooking show that is frequently abbreviated to FFF
  - Family Food Fight (American TV series), a cooking reality competition television series based on the Australian television series
- Fastest Finger First, the preliminary round on British quiz show franchise Who Wants to Be a Millionaire?, and a spin-off of the show in the UK based on the round

== Organisations ==
=== Breweries ===
- Triple fff Brewery, a brewery in Alton, Hampshire, England
- Three Floyds Brewing, a microbrewery in Munster, Indiana, U.S.

=== Other uses in organisations ===
- Fridays For Future, a youth-led climate justice movement
- FFF (gang), active in the San Fernando Valley during the 1980s
- Federation of Free Farmers, an agricultural organization in the Philippines
- Freedom Air Services a defunct Nigerian airline (ICAO code "FFF")
- Fuck for Forest, an environmental group that raises money through the production of pornography
- Fédération Française de Football (French Football Federation), the governing body of football in France

== Science and technology ==
- FFF system, a humorous system of measurement
- Feed-forward filter, the forward part of decision feedback equalizer
- Field flow fractionation, a fluid separation technique
- Form follows function – Design philosophy of 19th–20th centuries
- Fused filament fabrication, a 3D printing process making use of thermoplastic material
- Parafluorofuranylfentanyl, an opioid designer drug

== Sport ==
- Falkenbergs FF, a Swedish football team
- Farm Fresh Foxies, a Philippine volleyball team
- French Football Federation (French: Fédération Française de Football)
- Full Force Fighting, an American mixed martial arts promotion
- FFF Racing Team, a Chinese auto racing team

== See also ==
- Five finger fillet, a game played with a knife
- Three Fs, a series of demands first issued by the Tenant Right League in Ireland
- 3F (disambiguation)
