= Folio (disambiguation) =

A folio is a book size, the page number of books, or sheets with multiple printed pages.

Folio may also refer to:

== Printing and publishing ==
- Folio (typeface)
- Foolscap folio, a paper size
- Folio, a particular edition of a book printed on folio pages, such as the First Folio of William Shakespeare's plays

=== Periodicals ===
- Folio (magazine), a US trade magazine for the magazine industry founded in 1972
- Folio Weekly, an alternative newspaper in Jacksonville, Florida, US
- Folio, a literary magazine founded in 1984 and based at American University, D.C., US

== Brands and companies ==
- Folio Corporation, an information management software company
- Folio Society, a London membership-based publishing company
- Folio, an imprint of French publisher Éditions Gallimard
- Folio, Inc., developers of the F3 font format
- FOLIO is an open source library services platform maintained through collaboration between libraries, developers and vendors, including EBSCO Information Services
- Folio, one of hotel brands of Banyan Group

== Other uses ==
- Cynthia Folio (born 1954), American musician and composer
- Palm Foleo, a canceled subnotebook computer

== See also ==
- Fabasoft Folio Cloud, a cloud computing service
- Portfolio (disambiguation)
