= F3 =

F3 or F03 may refer to:

== Computing ==
- F3, a function key on a computer keyboard
- F3 (language), the working name for JavaFX Script, a scripting language
- Fat-Free Framework, a PHP web application framework

== Military ==
- Douglas F-3 Havoc, a photographic reconnaissance plane
- Douglas F3D Skyknight (later F-10 Skyknight), a Douglas twin engine, mid-wing jet fighter
- F 3 Malmslätt, a former Swedish Air Force unit
- Felixstowe F.3, a 1917 British First World War flying boat
- Hannover F.3, a World War I German prototype escort fighter
- HMS Cossack (F03), a 1937 British Royal Navy destroyer
- HMS F3, a British F class submarine
- Italian submarine F3, an Italian Regia Marina (Royal Navy) submarine in commission from 1916 to 1919
- McDonnell F3H Demon (later F-3 Demon), a United States Navy carrier-based jet fighter
- Mk F3 155mm, French self-propelled gun
- RAF Tornado F3, a British fighter
- USS F-3 (SS-22), a United States Navy submarine
- A future Japanese fighter jet (F-3 or F-X) based on the i3 conceptual jet fighter and Mitsubishi X-2 prototype

== Transportation ==
- BYD F3, an automobile
- EMD F3, a North American cab-style diesel locomotive introduced in 1945
- F3 (Istanbul Metro), a funicular railway line in Istanbul, Turkey
- F3 class, project name for the mega-cruise ship Norwegian Epic
- Fokker F.III, a 1921 Dutch single-engine high-winged monoplane aircraft
- Hinterhoeller F3, a yacht design by Canadian boat builder Hinterhoeller Yachts
- MV Agusta F3 series, an Italian sports motorcycle
- Spyder F3, a model of the three-wheeled motorcycle BRP Can-Am Spyder Roadster
- Sydney Ferries' Parramatta River ferry service, known as the F3
- Pacific Motorway (Sydney-Newcastle), formerly Sydney–Newcastle Freeway and commonly known as F3
- LNER Class F3, a class of British steam locomotives

== Arts ==
- F3 (manga) (F³: Frantic, Frustrated & Female), a hentai manga series
- F3 (film), a 2022 Indian Telugu-language film by Anil Ravipudi, a sequel to F2 (2019)
- F3, an album by Emade and Fisz

== Other ==
- F3 (classification), a wheelchair sport classification
- F3 (font format), created by Folio, Inc
- F3 (gene), a protein
- F3 isoprostane
- F3 Nation, a network of free peer-led workouts for men in the U.S.
- Form, fit and function, an engineering term relating to design processes
- Formula Three, a class of automobile racing
- Forsmark 3, a unit at Forsmark Nuclear Power Plant, Sweden
- Motorola Motofone F3, a mobile phone
- Nikon F3, an SLR camera
- A tornado intensity rating on the Fujita scale
- F_{3}, a type of formant in speech science
- F3, an EEG electrode site according to the 10-20 system
- F3 Derby, association football rivalry between Central Coast Mariners and Newcastle Jets

== See also ==
- F2 (disambiguation)
- 3F (disambiguation)
