= Fun and Frustration =

Fun and Frustration may refer to:

- F2: Fun and Frustration, a 2019 Indian Telugu-language film by Anil Ravipudi
  - F3: Fun and Frustration, its 2022 sequel also by Ravipudi

== See also ==
- F2 (disambiguation)
- F3 (disambiguation)
