= Wegmann & Co. =

German engineering company

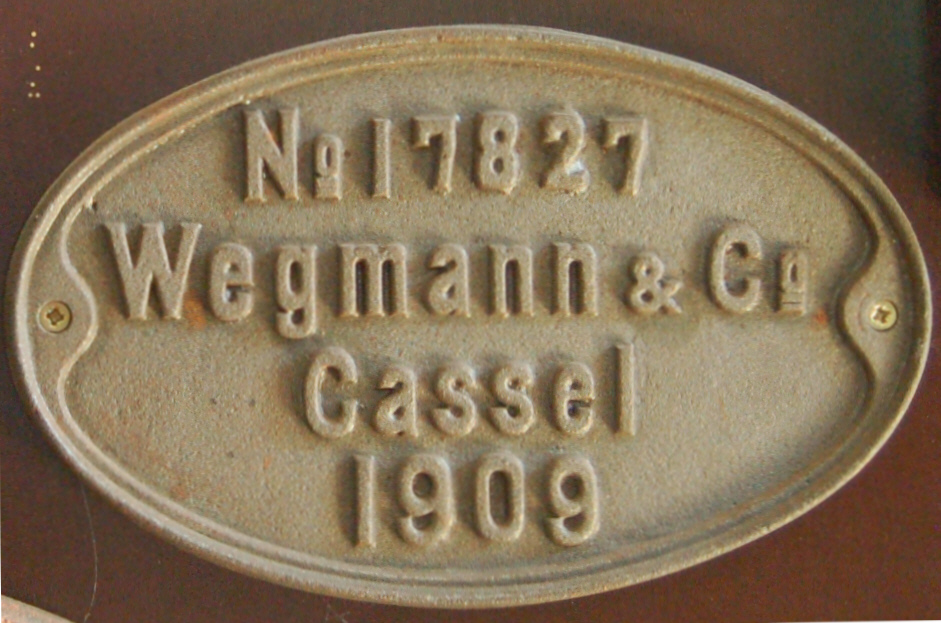
- Type plate of the 'Casseler Waggonfabriken von Wegmann, Harkort & Co from the year 1909
- Type: Limited commercial partnership (Kommanditgesellschaft)
- Industry: railway coach manufacture, arms industry, car maker
- Founded: 1882 (as Casseler Waggonfabriken von Wegmann, Harkort & Co.)
- Defunct: 1999
- Fate: Merger with the armaments side of Krauss-Maffei to become Krauss-Maffei Wegmann
- Headquarters: Kassel, Germany
- Key people: August Bode; Engelhard Bode (from 1960); Fritz Bode (from 1960); Manfred Bode (from 1979); Wolfgang Bode (from 1979)

The former coach factory of Wegmann & Co. was founded in 1882 in Kassel (then Cassel) by Kommerzienrat, Peter Wegmann, and Richard Harkort as the Casseler Waggonfabriken von Wegmann, Harkort & Co. In 1886 it changed its name to Wegmann & Co.

== History ==
In 1912 the company was taken over by engineer, August Bode, and businessman, Conrad Köhler. Towards the end of the First World War, in 1917, the firm was given an order for the construction of the first German tank, the K-Wagen. In the 1920s the construction of railway wagons was the focus of the company.

The firm became known in the 1930s as the manufacturer of passenger coaches for the Henschel-Wegmann train. In 1936 Wegmann & Co supplied the prototypes of the so-called Schürzenwagen. In addition, Wegmann built some of the state coaches of the special train for the Führer, which were used by Adolf Hitler.

In 1925 the 4/20 PS sports car was displayed at the German Automobile Exhibition in Berlin. The vehicle was designed with a streamlined wooden body that was covered with artificial leather. It had seating for two to three people. It had a wheelbase of 260 cm. It had various engine options. One source mentions a four-cylinder boxer engine from the Steudel-Werke with exactly 1016 cm³ displacement. A second source confirms the four-cylinder engine but does not provide any information on its origin. Another source states that it was a proprietary four-cylinder, four-stroke engine with water cooling. Werner Oswald and Ulrich Kubisch mention a two-cylinder boxer engine that was mounted in the rear. A displacement of about 1000 cm³ and power of 20 hp are confirmed. A three-speed gearbox and Cardan shaft are also mentioned. It is not known how many were built. In addition, a van with 2/10 hp has survived. It had a two-cylinder two-stroke engine by DKW with a choice of 412 cc displacement, 10 hp and air cooling or 389 cc displacement, 14 hp and water cooling. The transmission had two gears. The wheelbase was 165 cm. The kerb weight was given as 400 kg and the payload as 750 to 1000 kg. At the time, the company had the legal form of a Kommanditgesellschaft (limited partnership).

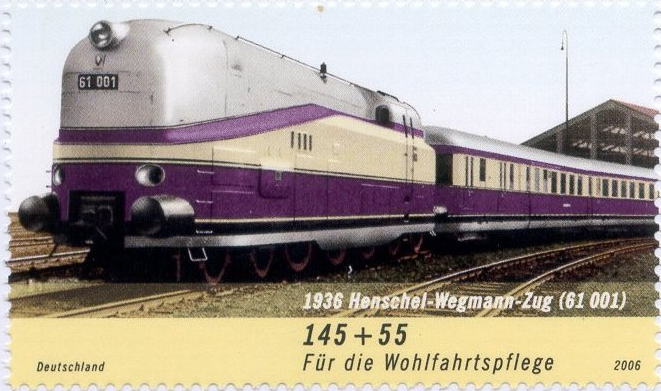
Semi-postal stamp depicting the Henschel-Wegmann Train

The company became known in the 1930s as a manufacturer of passenger carriages for the Henschel-Wegmann Train. Wegmann & Co delivered the six prototypes of the Schuurzenwagen in 1936. In addition, Wegmann built some of the saloon cars of the Führer's special train, which was available to Adolf Hitler. During the time of the Nazi dictatorship, the exploitation of forced labourers, prisoners of war and political prisoners was part of the corporate policy of the Wehrwirtschaftsführer, August Bode. Armoured combat vehicles were assembled and, above all, tank turrets were produced.

Even after the Second World War, Wegmann initially produced wagons and trams again. In 1950, under the direction of Fritz Bode, a battery electric bus was constructed, which was presented at the IAA in 1951 on a shortened Krauss-Maffei chassis of the KMO 133 type. Six AFA batteries were carried in a single-axle trailer. In 1959, Wegmann, in cooperation with Schaltbau and AFA, built the Kar 6209 the tunnel inspection vehicle for the Deutsche Bundesbahn.

In the early 1960s, the company participated in the development and production of the Leopard 1 and Leopard 2 main battle tanks. Later, the Light Artillery Rocket System (LARS), which was used by the Bundeswehr from 1969 to 2000, was added to their armament production range.

In 1960, August Bode's sons, Engelhard and Fritz, took over the management. Eight years later the company was split into two independent companies - Wegmann & Co. and Bode & Co. In 1979 Wegmann & Co. passed on to Fritz's sons, Manfred and Wolfgang Bode.

In 1999, Wegmann & Co. was incorporated into the armaments company of Krauss-Maffei Wegmann (KMW), with 51% of the company shares being owned by Wegmann and Co. Unternehmens-Holding KG in Kassel. The remaining shares in KMW were acquired from Siemens by the Wegmann Group in 2010. The Wegmann Group, which has been based in Fürstenfeldbruck since 2019, is controlled by the Bode family.

The street name of KMW's Kassel company location recalls former owner and honorary citizen of Kassel, August Bode.

== See also ==
- BKK Herkules, founded in 1888 as Betriebskrankenkasse Wegmann & Co.

== Literature ==
- Thomas Vollmer, Ralf Kulla: Panzer aus Kassel. Die Rüstungsproduktion der Firmen Henschel und Wegmann. Prolog Verlag, Kassel, 1994, ISBN 3-88122-996-5.
- Werner Oswald: Deutsche Autos 1920–1945, 10. Auflage, Motorbuch Verlag, Stuttgart 1996, ISBN 3-87943-519-7, S. 462.
- Ulrich Kubisch: Deutsche Automarken von A–Z. VF Verlagsgesellschaft, Mainz, 1993, ISBN 3-926917-09-1.
