= KNDS Deutschland =

German defense manufacturer

- Type: Subsidiary
- Industry: Defence
- Predecessors: KraussMaffei (defence division); Wegmann & Co.
- Founded: 1999; 27 years ago
- Headquarters: Munich, Germany
- Areas served: Germany, EU, worldwide
- Key people: Frank Haun (managing director); Manfred Bode (chairman)
- Revenue: 3,800,000,000 (2024)
- Number of employees: 2,771 (2014)
- Parent: KNDS
- Website: knds.de/en

KNDS Deutschland GmbH & Co, formerly Krauss-Maffei Wegmann GmbH & Co. KG (KMW), is an arms industry company based in Munich, Germany. The company produces military weapons and vehicles, including tanks, self-propelled artillery, and other armoured vehicles.

KMW was formed in 1999 when the defence division of KraussMaffei Group was spun off and merged with Wegmann & Co. In 2015, KMW became part of KMW+Nexter Defense Systems (KNDS), and in 2024 it was renamed KNDS Deutschland.

== History ==
KMW's predecessor company, Krauss-Maffei, started in 1931 from a merger of the two Munich firms of Maffei (founded 1838) and Krauss & Co. (founded 1860). Both belonged to the leading German makers of locomotives of various types. Maffei also built other steam-operated vehicles and, later, manufactured vehicles with combustion engines, including locomotives, trolleybuses and buses. In the 1960s, Kraus-Maffei entered production of armoured fighting vehicles, starting with Leopard 1 tanks for the Bundeswehr.

In 1999 defence production was spun off and merged with Wegmann & Co to form Krauss-Maffei Wegmann. Wegman had a 51% stake and Mannesmann AG, Kraus-Maffei's holding company at the time, had a 49% stake. Siemens acquired Mannesmann's share in 2000.

Wegmann Unternehmens-Holding KG, based in Kassel, bought the Siemens stake in December 2010 to become the sole shareholder of KMW. This holding company was owned by about 26 silent partners, all members of the families Bode, von Braunbehrens, von Maydell and Sethe and all descendants of the firm's founders or the later owners of Wegmann & Co.

In 2012, KMW acquired WFEL, a British company that descended from the Fairey Aviation Company.

In 2013 and 2014, about 80% of the firm's sales came from the export market, continuing a fifteen-year trend of exporting a large portion of production.

In 2014, the firm had 3,200 employees and €1 billion in sales, and the cost of a Leopard 2 tank was roughly €10 million. In 2014 KMW faced fines of up to €400 million because it had bribed Greek officials in the sale of tanks, and the German government was considering lifting its permission to export.

In December 2015, Krauss-Maffei Wegmann joined with the French state-owned defence company Nexter Systems to form KMW+Nexter Defense Systems, a new holding company half owned by KMW's old private owners and half owned by the French state. Rumoured as early as July 2014, the combined company was set to employ 6,000 people and have a yearly revenue of around €2 billion, plus an order book of €9 billion. French defence minister Jean-Yves Le Drian was content at the prospect of consolidating the terrestrial armoury of Europe.

=== Tank test track ===
The company has been running a tank test route in Allach since 1964, the building law of which is controversial. When KMW applied for an expansion of the operating hours in spring 2018, this met with resistance in parts of the residential and the district committee. At the end of 2020, the citizens' initiative "School instead of tank" submitted a petition to the Bavarian state parliament with a complaint against the test track. In the still ongoing petition procedure, the Ministry of the Environment made the statement that there was no existing protection for the circuit on Ludwigsfelder Straße and that the system was not approved in terms of building law. In addition, in October 2021, a lawsuit was submitted to the Munich Administrative Court in October 2021. In mid -January 2022, IG Metall campaigned for the preservation of the route, since 1650 jobs were in danger without it.

== Products ==
- Leopard 1 main battle tank
- Leopard 2 main battle tank
- Panzerhaubitze 2000 (PzH 2000) self-propelled howitzer
- Flugabwehrkanonenpanzer Gepard self-propelled anti-aircraft artillery
- Panzerschnellbrücke 2 armoured bridge layer (Leopard 2 chassis)
- Panzerschnellbrücke Leguan armoured bridge layer (Leopard 2 chassis)
- Artillery Gun Module (AGM), a derivative of PzH 2000 which has been further developed into the Donar self-propelled howitzer
- Dingo 1 & 2 infantry mobility vehicle
- FLW 100 and FLW 200 remote weapon stations
- Grizzly highly protected vehicle
- GTK Boxer armoured fighting vehicle
- MARS tracked multiple rocket launcher
- GFF4 armoured 4x4 personnel carrier
- Mungo ESK armoured transport vehicle
- Puma infantry fighting vehicle
- Fennek armoured reconnaissance vehicle
- F2 wheeled armoured vehicle
- RCH 155
- Terrier armoured 4x4 personnel carrier

== Gallery ==
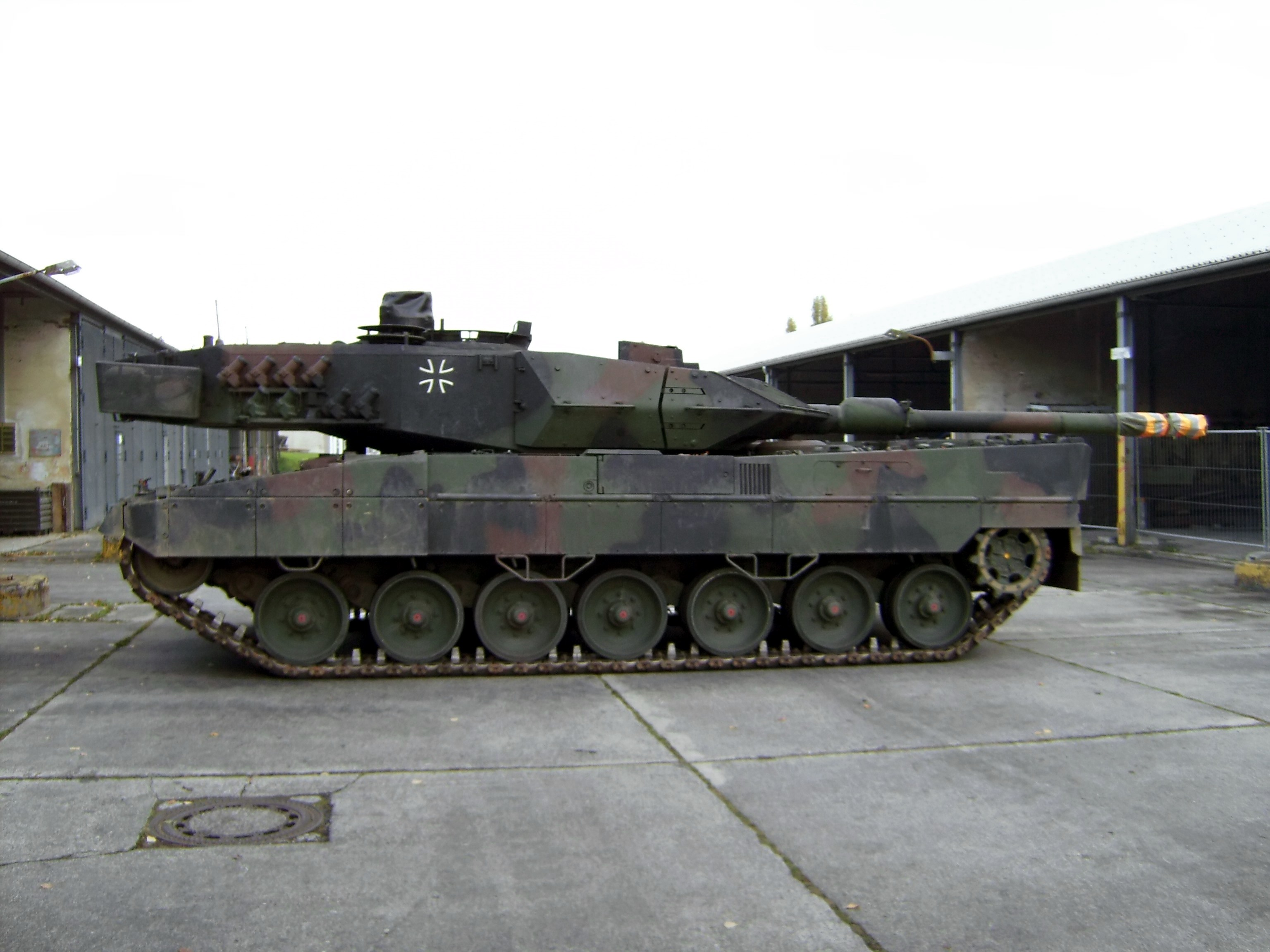
Leopard 2A6M

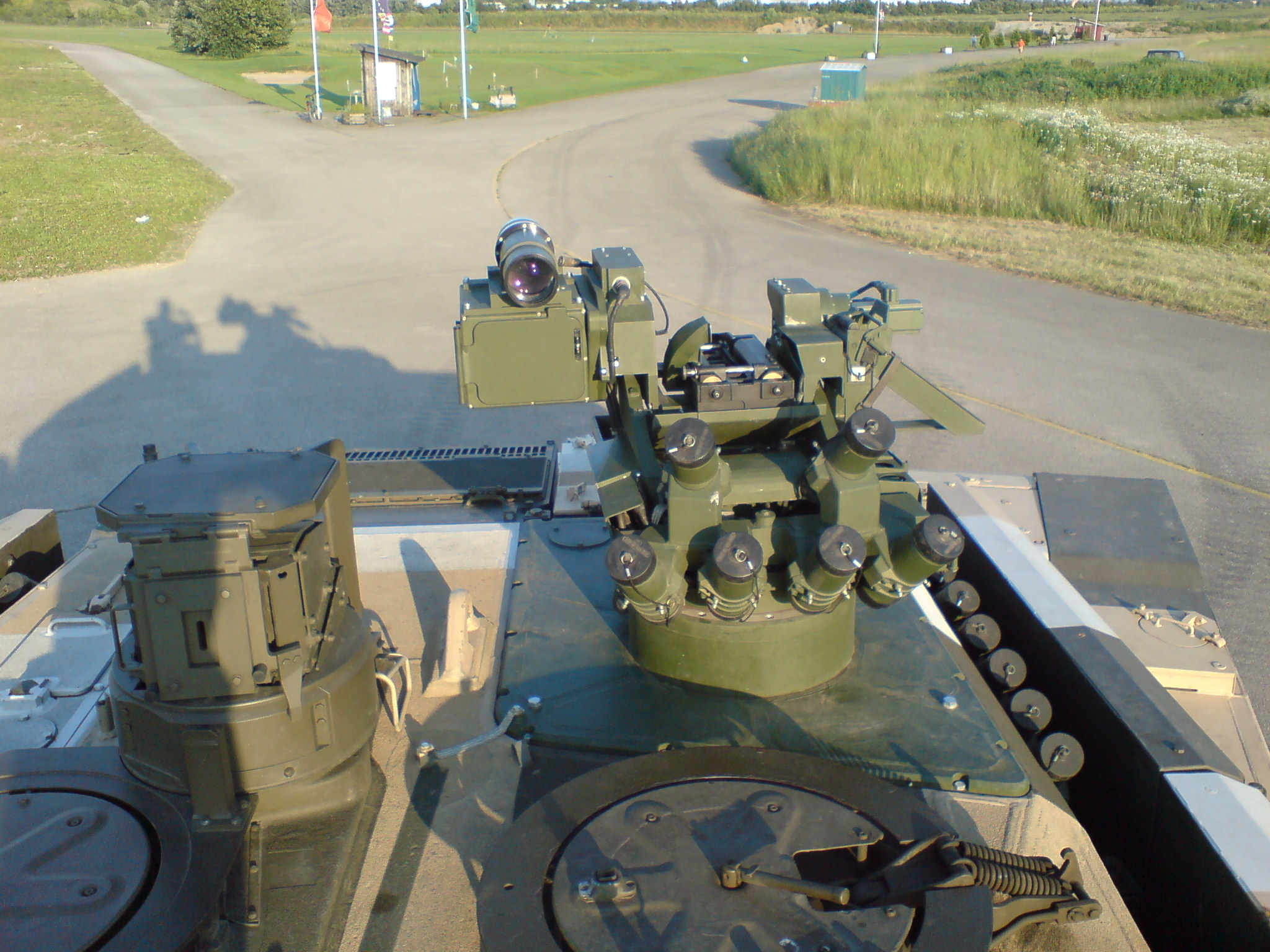
FLW 200 remote weapon station

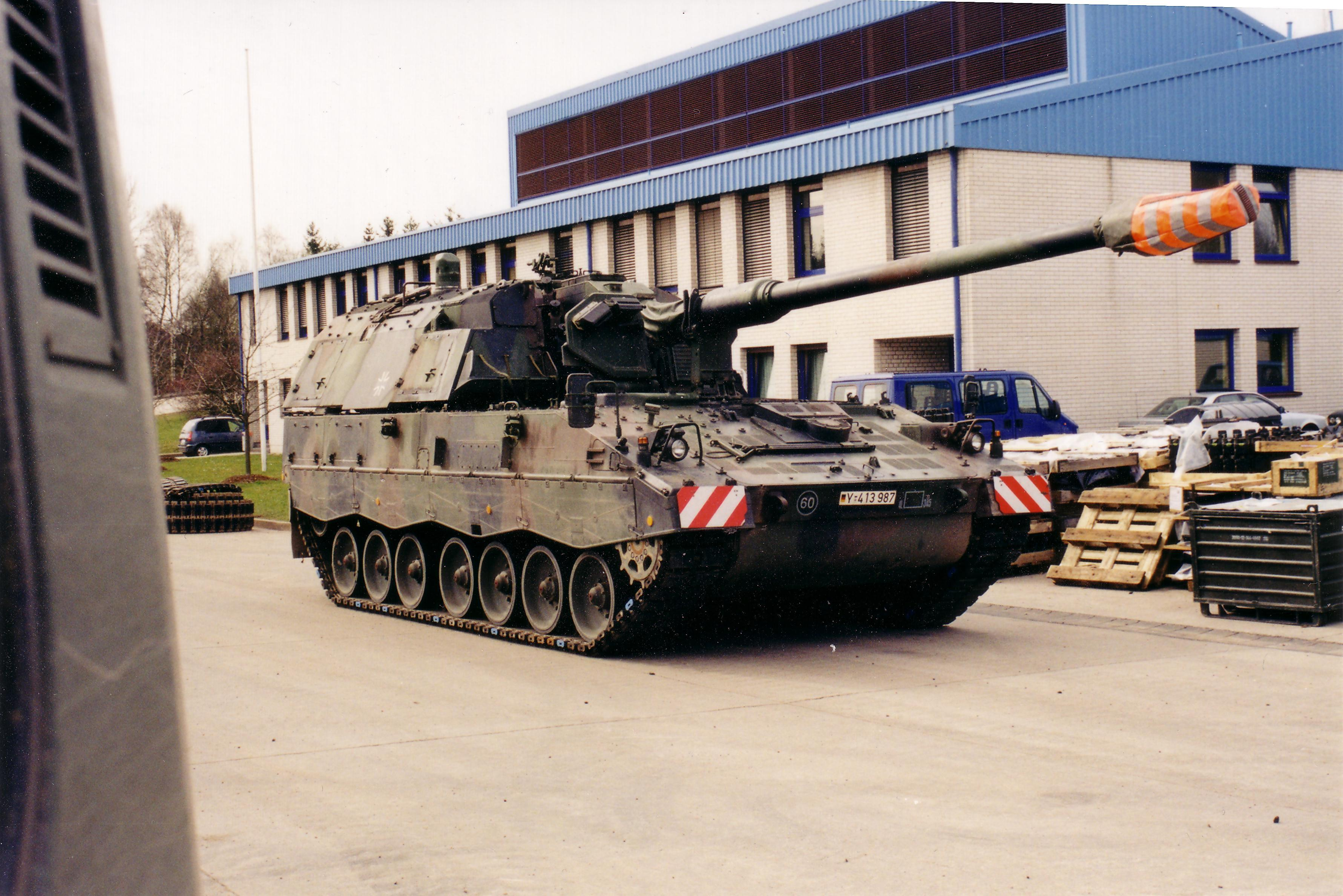
PzH 2000 of the German Army

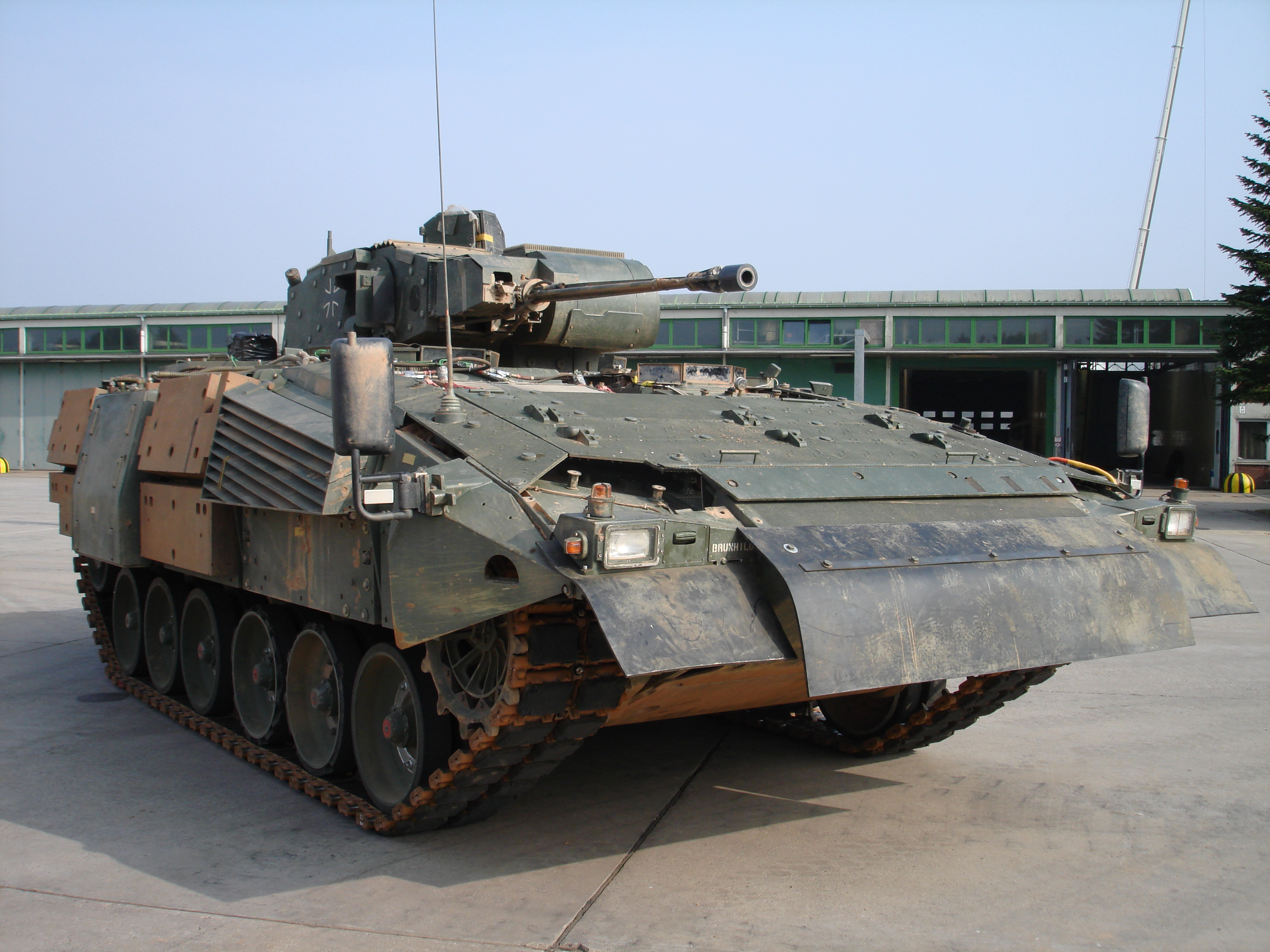
Puma

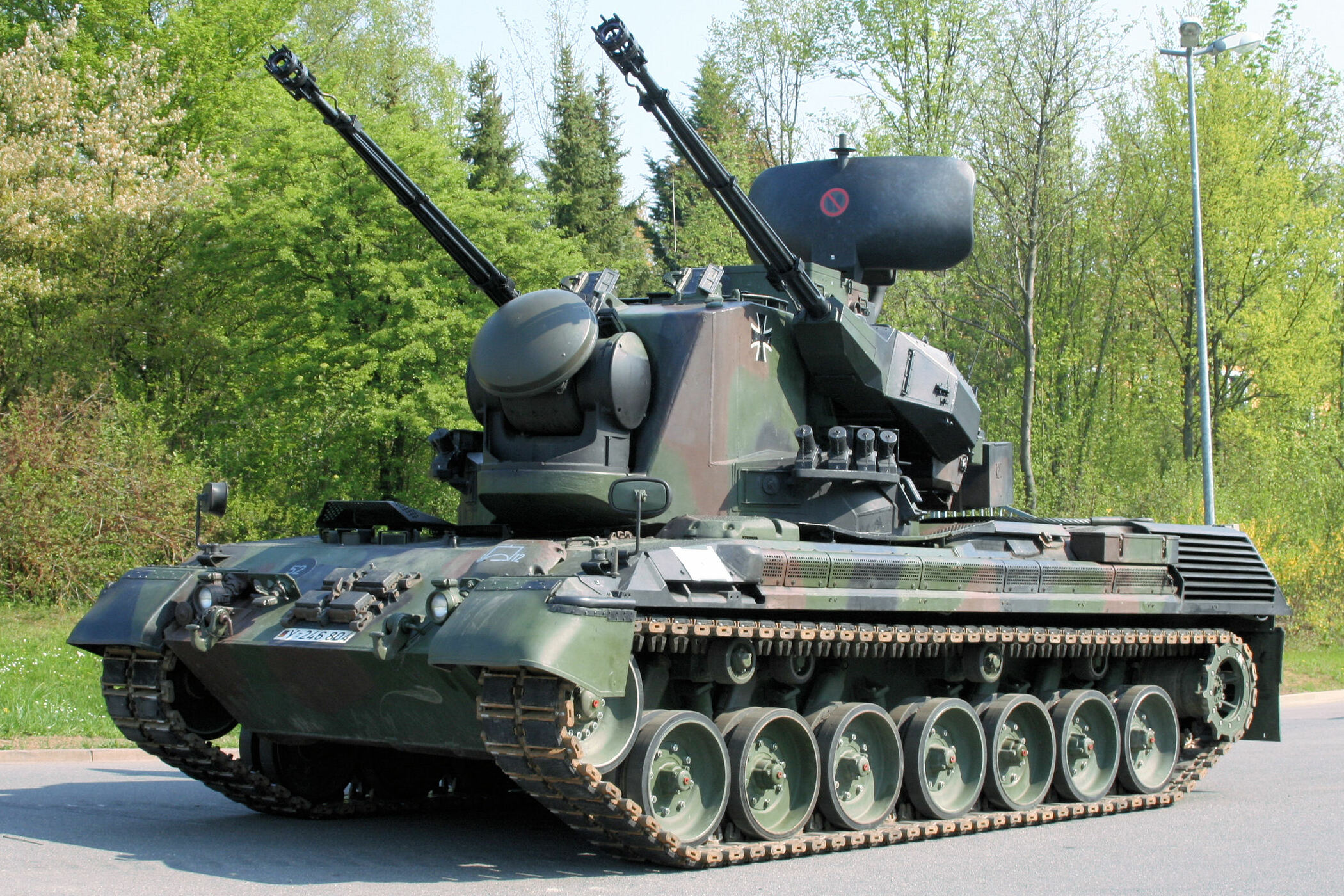
Flugabwehrkanonenpanzer Gepard

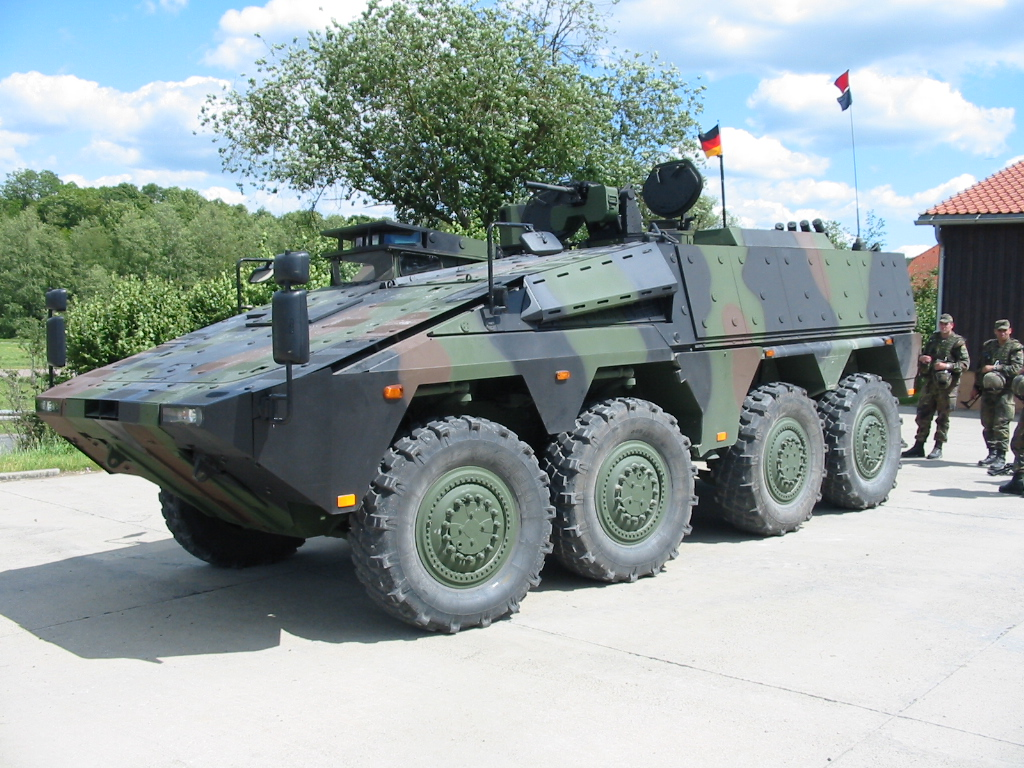
GTK Boxer

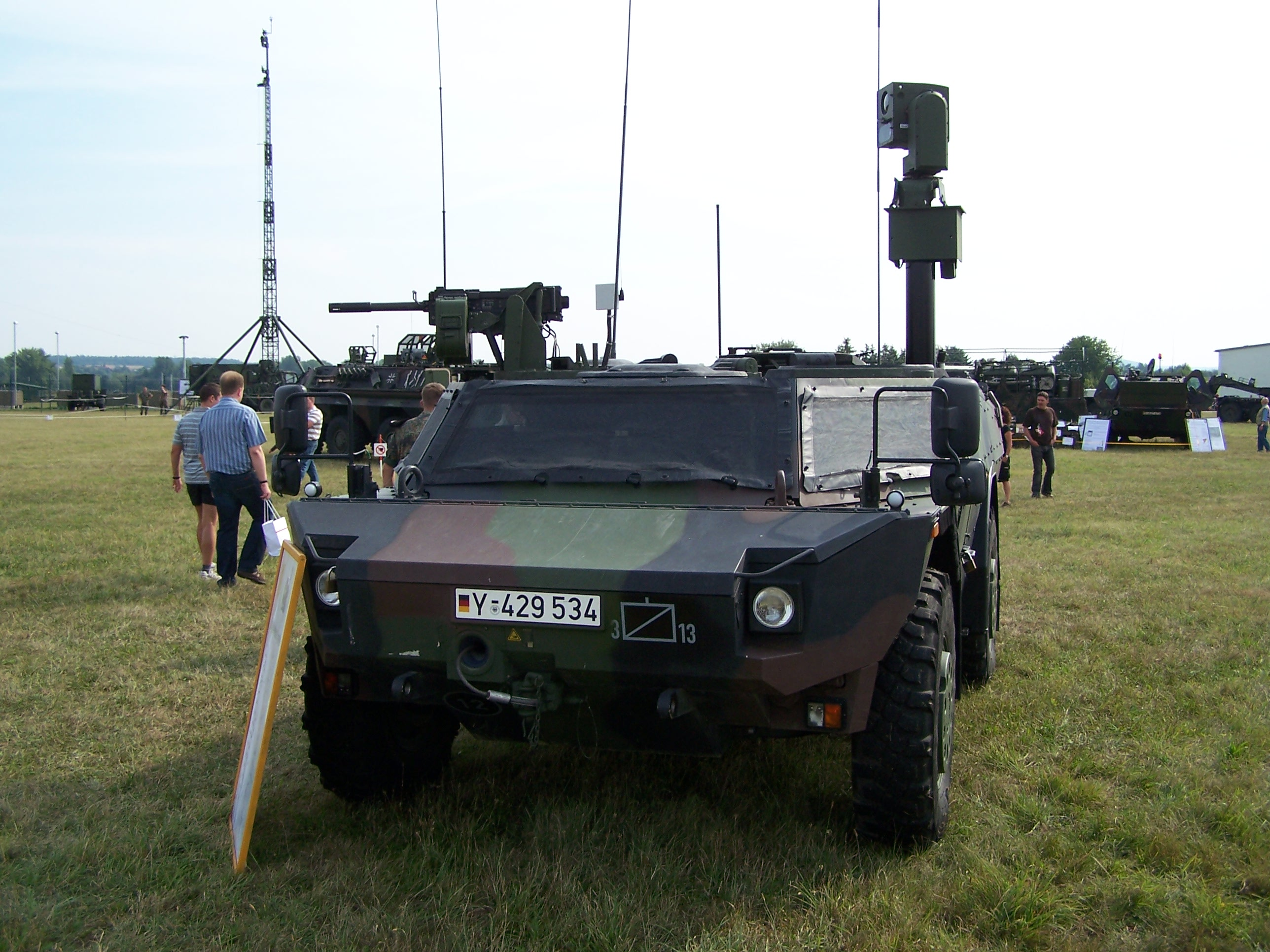
Fennek

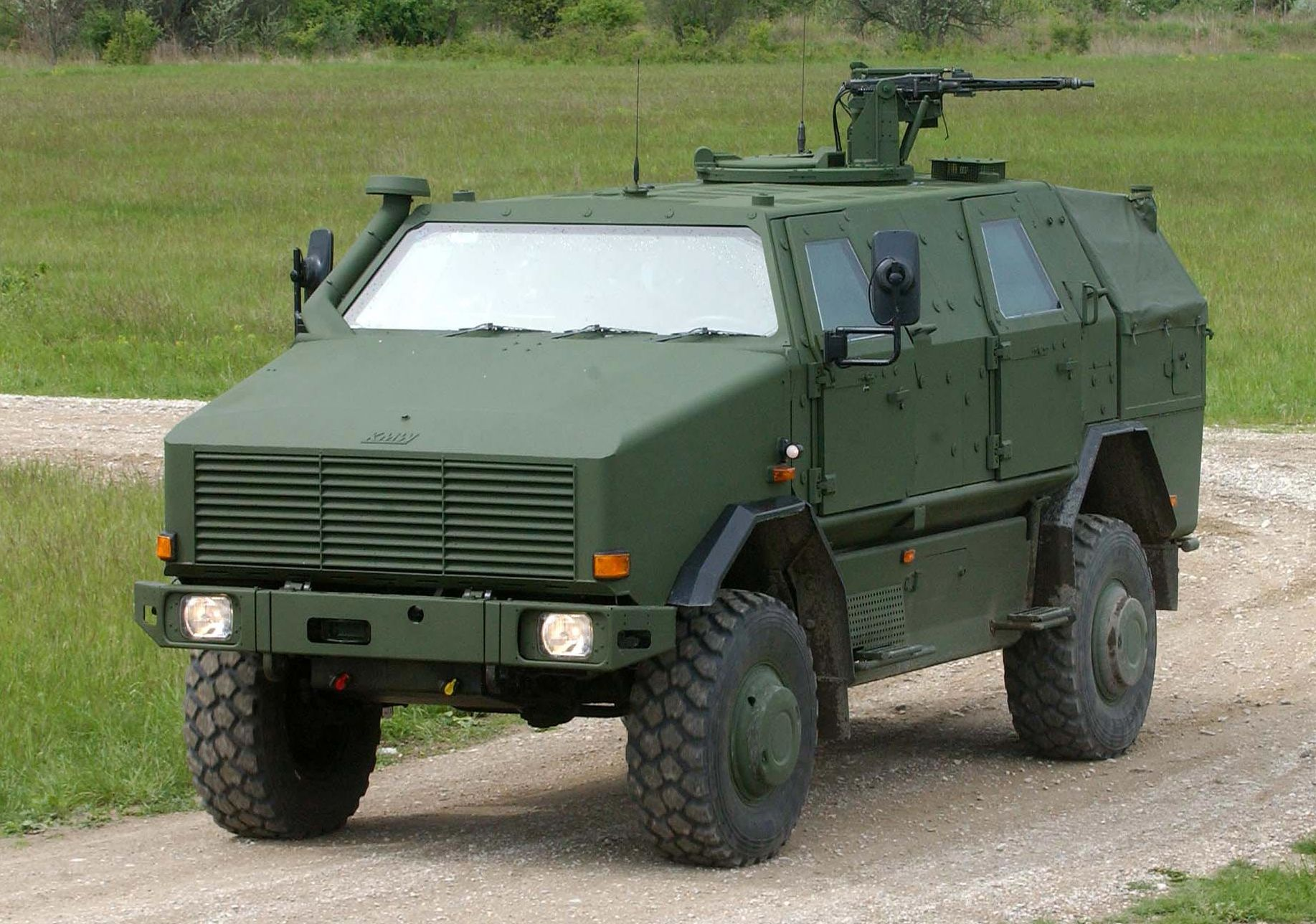
ATF Dingo 2

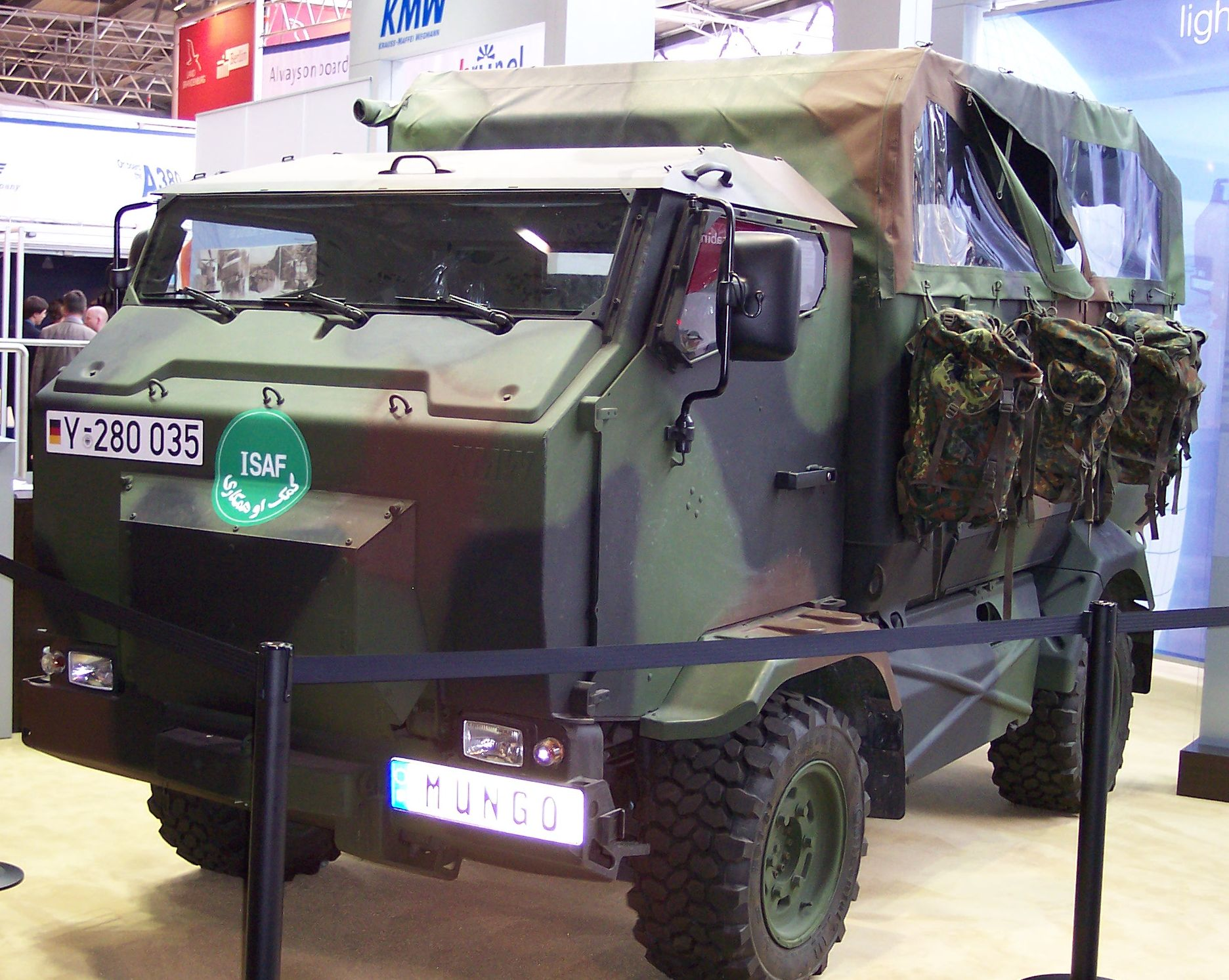
Mungo ESK
