= FFF (gang) =

Gang in Los Angeles

Fight For Freedom (FFF)
- Founded: 1980s
- Founders: Members of a punk rock band
- Territory: San Fernando Valley, Los Angeles
- Criminal activities: Gang-related activities
- Notable members: Mark Miller (prominent member)

Fight For Freedom (FFF) was a gang that was centered in the San Fernando Valley during the 1980s. Unique to this gang in its locale and time was that the group generally consisted of White Americans from middle class and upper middle class backgrounds. The gang was founded by members of a punk rock band of the same name.

FFF's activities largely came to an end when one of its prominent members, 15-year-old Mark Miller, was fatally shot outside of a Van Nuys nightclub in 1985.
