= John Hagedorn =

American criminologist (1947–2023)

John M. Hagedorn (July 30, 1947 – October 31, 2023) was an American professor of criminal justice at the University of Illinois at Chicago.

== Biography ==
Hagedorn dropped out of college in 1967 to work full-time in the civil rights and then anti-war movements. He was doing community organizing in Milwaukee in 1981 when he observed gangs forming. He ran the city's first gang diversion program and returned to school, getting his BS in 1985 and his MA in sociology in 1987 from the University of Wisconsin–Milwaukee.

Hagedorn studied under Joan Moore and received a PhD in Urban Studies in 1993 from the University of Wisconsin–Milwaukee. Hagedorn's first book, People & Folks, argued for more jobs than jails and applied William Julius Wilson’s underclass theory to gangs. He was the architect of a neighborhood-based, family centered social service reform that became the subject of his dissertation, published as Forsaking Our Children. With a crew of former gang members he conducted a multi-year re-study of Milwaukee gangs, which led to a second edition of People & Folks. In the first edition, Hagedorn predicted that if jobs were not created Milwaukee’s gangs would entrench in the illegal economy. This prediction, unfortunately, was supported by his subsequent research.

Hagedorn accepted a tenure track position at the University of Illinois at Chicago in 1996. He was editor, along with Meda Chesney-Lind, of Female Gangs in America, reprinting many of the classic academic articles on female gangs. His interest turned to Chicago gangs, and he became immersed in the history of the Vice Lords and the importance of race. His global travels further informed his understanding of gangs, which led him to edit the volume Gangs in the Global City, and later to write A World of Gangs. In A World of Gangs, he applied Manuel Castells’ work in analyzing gangs, arguing that understanding the cultural struggle for identity was crucial in working with gangs. Mike Davis calls Hagedorn's work the foundation of the critical school of gang studies. His most recent book, The In$ane Chicago Way, looks historically at gangs, organized crime, and corruption in Chicago.

Hagedorn died on October 31, 2023, at the age of 76.

== Sources ==
- Gang Research^{[usurped]}
- John Hagedorn^{[usurped]}
- Hagedorn CV (2.3.2014)
