= Autodefensas =

Autodefensas (Spanish for self-defenders) may refer to various Latin American vigilante groups:

== Colombia ==
- Right-wing paramilitarism in Colombia
- United Self-Defenders of Colombia (AUC)
- Peasant Self-Defenders of Córdoba and Urabá (ACCU)

== Mexico ==
- Grupos de autodefensa comunitaria, in the Gulf and South Mexico

== See also ==
- Auto Defense Choc, Laos
