= 3F =

3F or 3-F may refer to:

- Fédération Française de Football (French Football Federation), the governing body of football in France
- Fagligt Fælles Forbund
- Fangio, Farina, Fagioli - drivers of the Alfa Romeo factory team
- 3 Fonteinen - Belgian brewery, specializing in gueuze and kriek
- 0x3F, ASCII code for question mark
- Tres de Febrero Partido, Buenos Aires Province, Argentina

== See also ==
- F3 (disambiguation)
