= F3 Nation =

American exercise organization

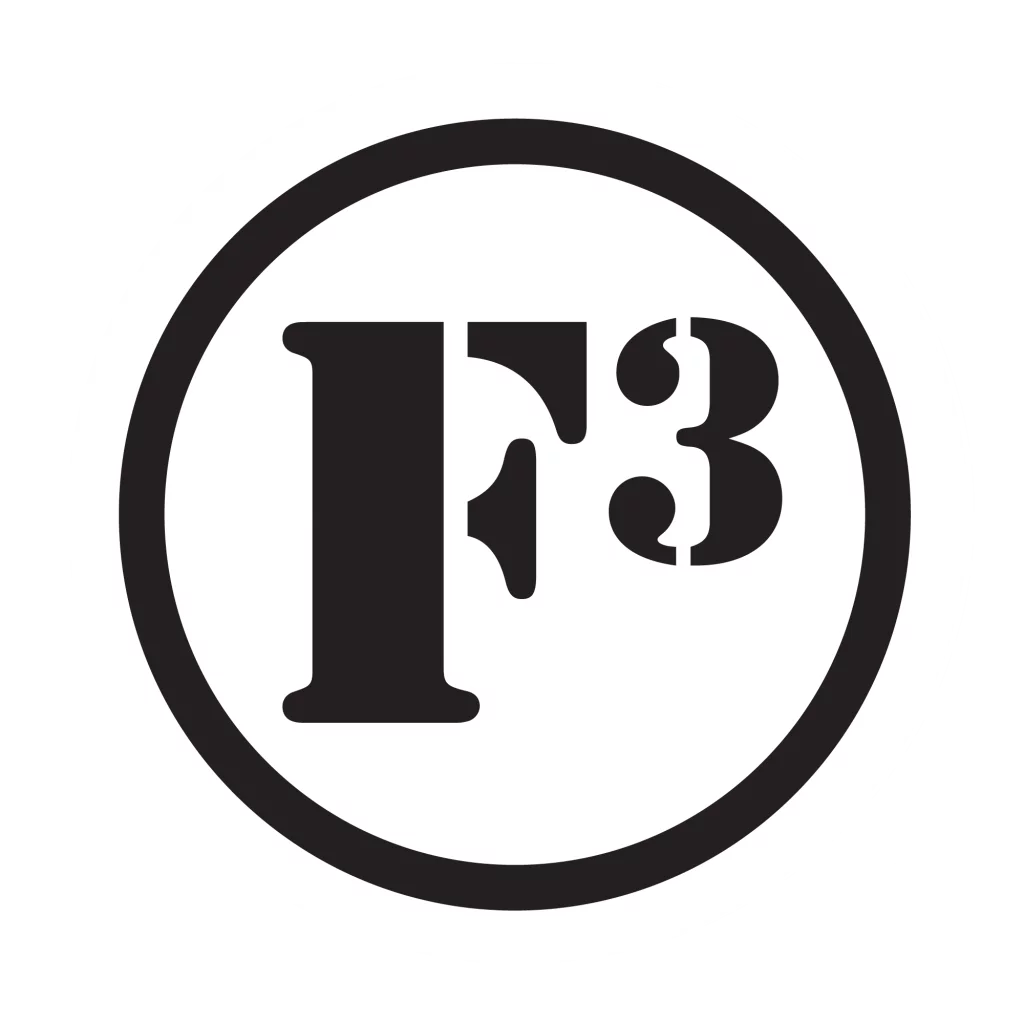

F3 Nation, or F3, is a network of free, peer-led workouts for men, founded in the United States on January 1, 2011, in Charlotte, North Carolina with an estimated 75,000+ active participants. These participants can be found at approximately 4,368 workout locations in 48 different states and 17 countries on 5 continents

The F3 name is an initialism, which stands for fitness, fellowship and faith, referring to the group's three organizing principles.

F3 has 5 "Core Principles" for their workouts.

1. Be free of charge.
2. Be open to all men.
3. Be held outdoors, rain or shine, heat or cold.
4. Be led by men who participate in the workout in a rotating fashion, with no training or certification necessary.
5. End with a Circle of Trust.

F3 is affiliated with FiA, or Females in Action, a network of free, peer-led workouts for women.

Each man participating in an F3 workout is assigned a nickname which he'll use during subsequent workouts.

F3 began in 2011, in North Carolina, when two friends (David Redding and Tim Whitmire) in Charlotte, North Carolina started a boot camp style workout for men.

F3 participants apply a distinctive lexicon of terms during their workouts. For example, an informal group leader is known as a "Nantan," a term adopted from an Apache word meaning chief.
