= Fill factor =

Fill factor may refer to:

- Fill factor (solar cell), the ratio of maximum obtainable power to the product of the open-circuit voltage and short-circuit current
- Fill factor (image sensor), the ratio of light-sensitive area of a pixel to total pixel area in an image sensor
- In vision science, the ratio of view areas to the object visible areas.
- In computer science, the proportion of space to use in a database index, the rest being reserved for future growth
