= Marussia F2 =

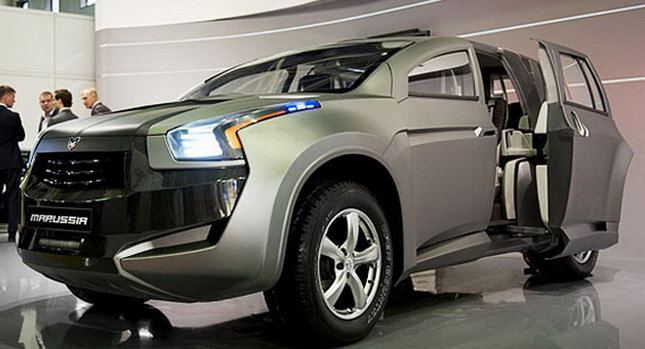

Overview
- Manufacturer: Marussia Motors and Valmet Automotive
- Production: 2010 (Concept car)

Body and chassis
- Class: Full-size luxury SUV
- Body style: 5-door SUV
- Layout: Front-engine, all-wheel-drive
- Doors: Power sliding doors

The Marussia F2 is a full-size luxury SUV designed and made by Marussia Motors and Valmet Automotive according to Marussia, it can be used as a mobile command center, as a military vehicle or as an emergency vehicle. The concept car was shown on May 2, 2010. The Marussia F2 model was scheduled to have 300 units made in 2012 by Valmet Automotive.

== Overview ==
The Marussia F2 is a concept car with a 5-door SUV body styling with 4 seats. Its doors have a manner in conventional front doors and power sliding doors as its doors are similar to the Bertone Genesis. The Marussia F2 is the first and only car in the full-size luxury SUV class to have power sliding doors.
