= 2F =

2F may refer to:

- 2F, the hexadecimal code (in ASCII and Unicode) for the slash character
- 2F-Spiele, a German publisher of board games located in Bremen
- Apartment 2F, a 1997 MTV sitcom
- Long March 2F, a Chinese rocket
- Transcription factor II F in biochemistry

== See also ==
- F2 (disambiguation)
