= FII =

FII may refer to:

- Fabricated or induced illness, also known as Münchausen syndrome by proxy
- Foreign Institutional Investor
- Forestry Innovation Investment, a company publicly owned and operated by the province of British Columbia, Canada
- Friends of Israel Initiative
- Falling into Infinity, a 1997 studio album by progressive metal band Dream Theater
- Fokker F.II, a commercial aircraft
- Foxconn Industrial Internet, a Chinese electrical equipment company
- Future Investment Initiative Institute, an investment conference in Saudi Arabia
