= KMW F2 =

The KMW F2 is a family of modular wheeled armoured vehicles, manufactured by KMW. The F2 is designed as a supplement to the Fennek and is intended to provide a maximum of mobility, protection and growth potential. The vehicle will be available in 4x4 patrol and 6x6 cargo variants, all being based on the same modular concept. KMW announced the development of the F2 in May 2008. The F2 is in use with the Bundeswehr and the Royal Netherlands Army it is meant to also reach other international customers. The Versions of the F2 such as the 6x6 version and the 4x4 version have a high number of the same parts which makes many things easier.

== Armament ==
The Fennek 2 has the capability to be armed with an overhead weapon station armed with a 7.62mm Machine Gun like the SIG MG 710 or a .50 caliber machine gun like the GAU-19 a 40mm automatic grenade launcher such as the M203. The All-Welded steel hull can protect from 7.62mm machine gun fire along with IED' s, Mine's and Ballistics. The outer armor can be fitted with protection for different missions and can also be fitted to protect from anti-tank fire.

== Technical specifications ==
- Combat weight: 7.5 - 24 t
- Payload: 4 t
- Maximum speed: 100 km/h
- Crew: 3-6 soldiers
- Protection: ballistic, mine, IED, RPG
- Range : 1000 km
- Engine Power : 2 x 150 kW

== See also ==
- Armoured fighting vehicle
- List of modern armoured fighting vehicles
