= Freedom Air Services =

IATA	ICAO	Call sign
-	FFF	INTER FREEDOM
- Founded: 28 May 1998
- Commenced operations: October 2001
- Ceased operations: 30 April 2007
- Hubs: Mallam Aminu International Airport; Murtala Mohammed International Airport
- Fleet size: 3
- Parent company: Freedom Air Services Limited
- Headquarters: Kaduna, Nigeria
- Website: Freedom Air Services

Freedom Air Services was an airline based in Kaduna, Nigeria. It operated scheduled domestic services and charter flights within West Africa. Its main bases were Mallam Aminu International Airport, Kano and Murtala Mohammed International Airport, Lagos.

== History ==
The airline was established on 28 May 1998 and started operations in October 2001 . It is owned by ADF (40%), Garba Kabo Shitu (founder and chief executive) (20%), Moh Garba Shitu (20%) and Yusufu Garba Shitu (20%).

== Destinations ==
Freedom Air Services operated services to the following domestic scheduled destinations (at January 2005): Abuja, Kaduna, Kano, Lagos and Maiduguri.

== Fleet ==
The Freedom Air Services fleet consisted of the following aircraft (at March 2007):

- 1 Boeing 727-200

=== Previously operated ===
At August 2006 the airline also operated a further:

- 2 Boeing 727-200
