= F3 (font format) =

F3 is an outline font format created by Folio, Inc. Sun Microsystems acquired Folio in 1988, and included 57 F3 fonts and the F3 interpreter, TypeScaler, in its OpenWindows desktop environment. The font format allowed for hinting. The extension of F3 Font Format outlines is .f3b.
