= Fisch (surname) =

Fisch is a German language occupational surname, which means "fisherman" or "fish seller", derived from the Middle High German visch, meaning "fish". The name may refer to:

- Arline Fisch (1931-2024), American artist
- Asher Fisch (born 1958), Israeli conductor
- Bernhard Fisch (1926–2020), German writer
- Edith Fisch (1923–2006), American legal scholar
- Erika Fisch (1934–2021), German athlete
- Hans Ulrich Fisch (1583–1647), Swiss painter
- Herminia Fisch, birth name of Herminia Naglerowa (1890–1957), Polish writer and publicist
- Isidor Fisch (1905–1934), German associate of Bruno Hauptmann
- Jedd Fisch (born 1976), American football coach
- Jill Fisch, American legal scholar
- Jörg Fisch (1947–2024), Swiss historian
- Klaus Fisch (1893–1975), German painter
- Menachem Fisch (born 1948), Israeli philosopher
- Olga Fisch (born 1901–1990), artist and rugmaker
- Richard Fisch (1926–2011), American psychiatrist
- Robert O. Fisch (1925–2022), Hungarian-born American pediatrician
- Walter Fisch (1910–1966), German politician

== See also ==
- Fish (surname)
- Fysh, surname
