= Fish (disambiguation) =

Fish are vertebrates with gills and without digits.

Fish, The Fish, or FISH may also refer to:

== Common, related meanings ==
- Fish, engage in the activity of fishing/catching fish
- Fish as food

== People ==
- Fish (nickname)
- Fish (surname)
- Fish (singer) (born 1958), Scottish singer and former lead singer of Anglo-Scottish rock group Marillion
- Fish Leong (born 1978), stage name of Jasmine Leong, Malaysian singer
- Fish Liew (born 1990), Malaysian-born Hong Kong model and actress
- Fish Mahlalela (born 1962), South African politician

== Arts and entertainment ==
=== Characters ===
- Fish, a character in the comic strip Beyond the Black Stump
- Fish (The Cat in the Hat)

=== Games ===
- Fish (card game), a simple card game
- Fish!, a computer game released by Magnetic Scrolls in 1988

=== Music ===
- "Fish" (song), a song by Craig Campbell, 2011
- "Fish", a song by The Damned from their 1977 album Damned Damned Damned
- "Fish", a song by King from their 1984 album Steps in Time
- "Fish", a song by Mr. Scruff from his 1999 album Keep It Unreal
- "Fish", a song by Bonnie Pink from her 2000 album Let Go
- "The Fish (Schindleria Praematurus)", a song by Yes from their 1971 album Fragile
- "Fish", a song by Tyler, the Creator from his 2011 album, Goblin
- "Fish", a song by Got7 from their 2016 EP, Flight Log: Departure
- Fish, an English indie rock band now known as Sorry

=== Television ===
- Fish (British TV series), featuring an idealistic lawyer
- Fish (American TV series), a 1970s show starring Abe Vigoda as Detective Phillip Fish
- "Fish" (Life), a 2009 documentary episode
- "Fish" (Mandy), a 2020 episode
- "Fish", an episode of Thomas the Tank Engine and Friends
- "Fish", a season 3 episode of Servant (TV series)
- "Fishes" (The Bear), a 2023 episode of The Bear TV series

=== Radio stations ===
- KAIA (FM), "95.9 The Fish", La Mirada, California
- KPOZ, "The Fish 104.1 FM", Scappoose, Oregon
- KLVB (FM), "103.9 FM The Fish", Lincoln, California
- KVNB, "933 FM The Fish", Little Rock, Arkansas
- W240CX, "95.9 The Fish", Columbus, Ohio
- WAIA (FM), "The Fish 104.7", Athens, Georgia
- WKLV-FM, "95.5 The Fish", Cleveland, Ohio

== Science and technology ==
- FISH (cipher) (FIbonacci SHrinking), a stream cipher published in 1993
- Fish (cryptography) (sometimes FISH), British codeword for World War II German stream cipher teleprinter secure communications devices
- Files transferred over shell protocol, a network protocol for transferring files between computers and manage remote files
- First Invisible Super Hustler, a prototype reconnaissance aircraft design
- Fluorescence in situ hybridization (FISH), a technique used in genetics to detect DNA sequences
- Fish (Unix shell), a Unix command shell

== Sports ==
- Fish, nickname of the Miami Dolphins National Football League team
- Fish, nickname of the Miami Marlins Major League Baseball team
- The Fish, nickname of Fisher Athletic F.C. (1908–2009), a defunct semi-professional football club in London
- The Fish, nickname of Fisher F.C., a non-League football team based in Bermondsey, founded in 2009
- The Fishes, nickname of Newport (Salop) Rugby Union Football Club, an English rugby team
- "The Fish", nickname of Real Quiet, an American Thoroughbred racehorse

== Other uses ==
- The Fish (poem), a 1918 poem by Marianne Moore
- "The Fish" (short story), an 1885 short story by Anton Chekhov
- Fish, a kind of surfboard
- Fish, slang term for a torpedo
- Fish, a term for an inexperienced, easily victimized person in poker
- Fish or Christian fish, colloquial names for Ichthys
- Fish River (disambiguation)
- Forum on Information Standards in Heritage Information resources that support best practice in recording cultural heritage, including the FISH Vocabularies
- Fish! Philosophy, a motivational program for the workplace
- The Fish (train), a passenger train running between Lithgow and Sydney, Australia
- Pisces, the constellation or the namesake astrological sign, both known as "the fish"

== See also ==
- FSH (disambiguation)
- Phish, an American jam band noted for their musical improvisation
- Phishing, an Internet crime
- Ghoti, a constructed word, pronounced "fish", used to illustrate irregularities in English spelling
