= Leonid Berlyand =

Soviet-American mathematician (born)

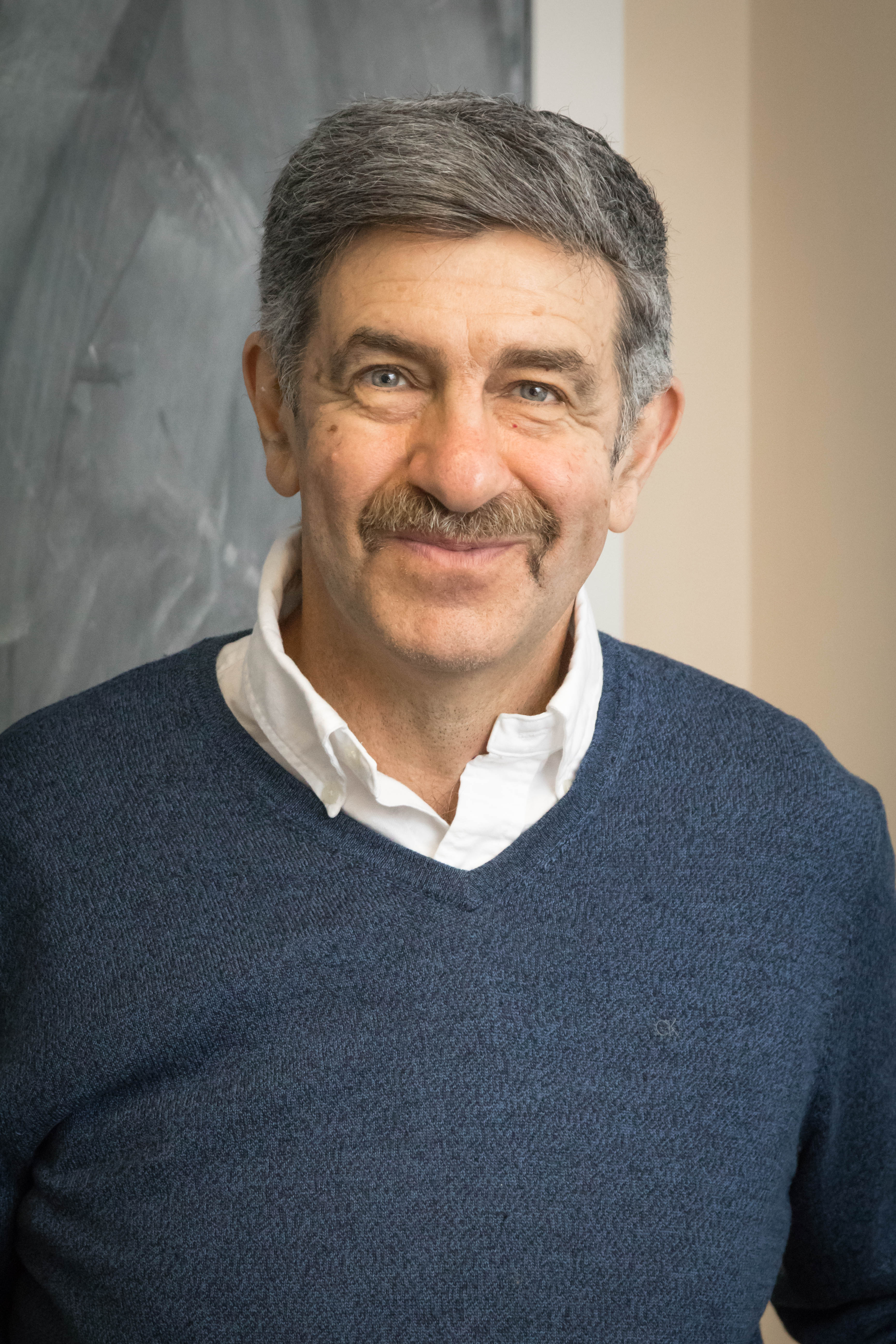
- Born: Kharkiv, Ukraine
- Education: Kharkiv State University
- Known for: works on homogenization
- Awards: Humboldt Prize
- Scientific career
- Fields: Applied mathematics, homogenization, mathematical biology, deep learning
- Workplaces: Kharkiv State University, Semenov Institute of Chemical Physics, Penn State University
- Thesis: Homogenization of Elasticity Equations in Domains with Fine-Grained Boundaries
- Doctoral advisor: Evgeny Khruslov

Leonid Berlyand is a Soviet and American mathematician, a professor of Penn State University. He is known for his works on homogenization, Ginzburg–Landau theory, mathematical modeling of active matter and mathematical foundations of deep learning.

== Life and career ==
Leonid Berlyand was born in Kharkiv, Ukraine. His father, Viktor Berlyand, was a mechanical engineer, and his mother, Mayya Genkina, an electronics engineer. He graduated from the department of mathematics and mechanics at the V. N. Karazin Kharkiv National University. Then he obtained his Ph. D. degree from the same university. In his Ph. D. thesis, he applied the homogenization theory to study of elastic composite materials. After his defence, he worked at the Semenov Institute of Chemical Physics in Moscow. In 1991 he moved to the United States and started working at Pennsylvania State University, where he has served as a full professor since 2003. He has held long-term visiting positions at the Collège de France, Princeton University, the California Institute of Technology, the University of Chicago, the Max Planck Institute for Mathematics in the Sciences, Sorbonne University, Heidelberg University, Argonne and Los Alamos National Laboratories. His research has drawn support from the National Science Foundation(NSF), NIH/NIGMS, the Applied Mathematics Program of the DOE Office of Sciences, BSF (the Bi-National Science Foundation USA-Israel) and the NATO Science for Peace and Security Section. Berlyand has authored over 100 works on homogenization theory and PDE/variational problems in biology and material science. He has organized a number of professional conferences and serves as one of two founding co-directors of the Center for Mathematics of Living and Mimetic Matter and the Center for Interdisciplinary Mathematics at Penn State University. He has supervised 16 Ph. D. students and 8 postdoctoral fellows.

== Research ==
Drawing upon fundamental works in classical homogenization theory, Berlyand advanced the methods of homogenization in many versatile applications. He obtained mathematical results applicable to diverse scientific areas including biology, fluid mechanics, superconductivity, elasticity, and material science. His mathematical modeling explains striking experimental result in the collective swimming of bacteria. His homogenization approach to multi-scale problems was transformed into a practical computational tool by introducing a concept of polyharmonic homogenization which led to a new type of multiscale finite elements. Together with H. Owhadi, he introduced a "transfer-of-approximation" modeling concept, based on the similarity of the asymptotic behavior of the errors of Galerkin solutions for two elliptic PDEs. He also contributed to mathematical aspects of the Ginzburg–Landau theory of superconductivity/superfluidity by introducing a new class of semi-stiff boundary problems.

In 2020s Berlyand got interested in the rapidly developing area of deep learning. His focus has been on mathematical foundations of deep learning, specifically he addressed the mathematical issues of convergence and stability of training algorithms for deep neural networks (DNNs) and formation of fixed points of DNNs. Subsequently he worked on application of the Marchenko-Pastur distribution of Random Matrix Theory to pruning of DNNs that drastically improves training efficiency. Berlyand also studied existence and stability of fixed points of autoencoder neural networks. This work was done in collaboration with his Ukrainian colleagues. In 2023 he published a textbook on introduction to mathematics of deep learning together with Pierre-Emmanuel Jabin.

== Awards and honors ==
- C. I. Noll Award for Excellence in Teaching, Penn State University (2004).
- Honorary professor of the Moscow State University "for his important contribution to Applied Mathematics and Mathematical Physics" (2017)
- Humboldt Prize (2021)

== Membership in professional associations ==
- Society for Industrial and Applied Mathematics (since 1993)
- Society for Mathematical Biology (since 2012)

== Editorship ==
- Managing Editor of Networks and Heterogeneous Media
- Associate Editor of SIAM/ASA Journal on Uncertainty Quantification (2013–2016)
- Member of Editorial board of International Journal for Multiscale Computational Engineering

== Books (author) ==
- "Introduction to Network Approximation for Materials Modeling" (with A. Kolpakov and A. Novikov), Cambridge University Press, 2012.
- "Getting Acquainted with Homogenization and Multiscale" (with V. Rybalko), part of the Compact Textbooks in Mathematics book series, Springer, 2018.
- "Mathematics of Deep Learning. An Introduction" (with P.-E. Jabin) De Gruyter, In the series De Gruyter Textbook, 2023.

== Selected publications ==
- “Enhancing accuracy in deep learning using random matrix theory” (with E. Sandier, Y. Shmalo, and L. Zhang) Journal of Machine Learning, 3(4), pp. 247–412 (2024)
- “Emergence of traveling waves and their stability in a free boundary model of cell motility” (with V. Rybalko), Transactions of AMS, 376(3), pp. 1799–1844 (2023)
- "Stability in the Training of Deep Neural Networks and Other Classifiers" (with P.-E. Jabin and C. A. Safsten), Mathematical Models and Methods in Applied Sciences (M3AS), v. 31(11), pp. 2345–2390 (2021)
- "Phase-Field Model of Cell Motility: Traveling Waves and Sharp Interface Limit" (with M. Potomkin and V. Rybalko), Comptes Rendus Mathématique, 354(10), pp. 986–992 (2016)
- "Rayleigh Approximation for ground states of the Bose and Coulomb glasses" (with S. D. Ryan, V. Mityushev, and V. M. Vinokur), Scientific Reports: Nature Publishing Group, 5, 7821 (2015)
- "Flexibility of bacterial flagella in external shear results in complex swimming trajectories" (with M. Tournus, A. Kirshtein, and I. Aranson), Journal of the Royal Society Interface 12 (102) (2014)
- "Vortex phase separation in mesoscopic superconductors" (with O. Iaroshenko, V. Rybalko, V. M. Vinokur), Scientific Reports: Nature Publishing Group 3 (2013)
- "Effective viscosity of bacterial suspensions: A three-dimensional PDE model with stochastic torque" (with B.M. Haines, I.S. Aranson, D.A. Karpeev), Comm. Pure Appl. Anal., v. 11(1), pp. 19–46 (2012)
- "Flux norm approach to finite dimensional homogenization approximations with non-separated scales and high contrast" (with H. Owhadi), Arch. Rat. Mech. Anal., v. 198, n. 2, pp. 677–721 (2010)
- "Solutions with Vortices of a Semi-Stiff Boundary Value Problem for the Ginzburg-Landau Equation" (with V. Rybalko), J. European Math. Society v. 12 n. 6, pp. 1497–1531 (2009)
- "Fictitious Fluid Approach and Anomalous Blow-up of the Dissipation Rate in a 2D Model of Concentrated Suspensions" (with Y. Gorb and A. Novikov), Arch. Rat. Mech. Anal., v. 193, n. 3, pp. 585–622, (2009), DOI:10.1007/s00205-008-0152-2
- "Effective Viscosity of Dilute Bacterial Suspensions: A Two-Dimensional Model" (with B. Haines, I. Aronson, and D. Karpeev), Physical Biology, 5:4, 046003 (9pp) (2008)
- "Ginzburg-Landau minimizers with prescribed degrees. Capacity of the domain and emergence of vortices" (with P. Mironescu), Journal of Functional Analysis, v. 239, n. 1, pp. 76–99 (2006)
- "Network Approximation in the Limit of Small Interparticle Distance of the Effective Properties of a High-Contrast Random Dispersed Composite" (with A. Kolpakov), Archive for Rational Mechanics and Analysis, 159, pp. 179–227 (2001)
- "Non-Gaussian Limiting Behavior of the Percolation Threshold in a Large System" (with J.Wehr), Communications in Mathematical Physics, 185, 73–92 (1997), pdf.
- "Large Time Asymptotics of Solutions to a Model Combustion System with Critical Nonlinearity" (with J. Xin), Nonlinearity, 8:161–178 (1995)
- "Asymptotics of the Homogenized Moduli for the Elastic Chess-Board Composite" (with S. Kozlov), Archive for Rational Mechanics and Analysis, 118, 95–112 (1992)
