= List of honorary professors of Moscow State University =

This is the list of Honorary Professors of Moscow State University.

- Chinghiz Aitmatov, Russian/Kyrgyz novelist (2004)
- Askar Akayev, physicist, 1st President of Kyrgyzstan (1996)
- Patriarch Alexy II of Moscow (1993)
- Zhores Alferov, physicist, Nobel Prize winner (2001)
- Heydar Aliyev, 3rd President of Azerbaijan (2008)
- Ilham Aliyev, 4th President of Azerbaijan (2008)
- Tatiana Anodina, aviation engineer, the chairperson of the Interstate Aviation Committee (2015)
- Dario Antiseri, Italian philosopher (2002)
- Irina Arkhipova, opera singer (2001)
- Mykola Azarov, geologist, 14th Prime Minister of Ukraine (2014)
- Ban Ki-moon, South Korean politician, 8th Secretary-General of the United Nations (2008)
- Craig Barrett, American business executive, the CEO of Intel (2000)
- Leonid Berlyand, American mathematician (2017)
- John Bernal, British biophysicist and historian of science (1956)
- Klaus von Beyme, German political scientist (2010)
- Giovanni Fabrizio Bignami, Italian astrophysicist (2013)
- Niels Bohr, Danish physicist, Nobel Prize winner (1961)
- Irina Bokova, Bulgarian politician, former Director-General of UNESCO (2011)
- Massimo Capaccioli, Italian astrophysicist (2010)
- Yevgeniy Chazov, physician and healthcare executive (2002)
- Viktor Chernomyrdin, industrialist and politician, 29th Prime Minister of Russia (1997)
- James Franklin Collins, American diplomat, a former United States Ambassador to Russia (2001)
- Arnaud Denjoy, French mathematician (1956)
- Fidel Felix Castro Diaz-Balart, Cuban politician, son of Fidel Castro, graduate of the Moscow State University (2013)
- Nikolai Dobronravov, poet (2015)
- Werner Ebeling, German physicist (2006)
- Terence Emmons, American historian, specialist in Russian history (2005)
- Bertalan Farkas, Hungarian cosmonaut, first Esperantist in space (2015)
- Vladimir Fedoseyev, conductor, People's Artist of the USSR (2006)
- Gérard Férey, French chemist (2014)
- William Z. Foster, American communist, a chairman of the Communist Party in the United States (1961)
- Juan Ramón de la Fuente, Mexican psychiatrist, healthcare and academic administrator (2006)
- Hans-Georg Gadamer, German philosopher (2000)
- Indira Gandhi, 3rd Prime Minister of India (1971)
- Valery Gergiev, conductor and opera company director (2001)
- Valéry Giscard d'Estaing, President of France (2015)
- Rolf Gleiter, German chemist (2003)
- Thomas Gries, Director of the RWTH Aachen Institute of Textile Technology (ITA) (2013)
- Stanislav Grof, Czech psychiatrist (2007)
- Marek Halter, French writer and journalist (1998)
- Dmitri Hvorostovsky, opera singer, People's Artist of Russia (2006)
- Daisaku Ikeda, Japanese Buddhist philosopher (2002)
- Paul Irwin, American Methodist minister and animal protection activist (2002)
- Gjorge Ivanov, 4th President of Macedonia (2014)
- Vladimir Jurowski, conductor (2016)
- Sergey Kapitsa, physicist and a host of a popular scientific TV show (2010)
- Islam Karimov, 1st President of Uzbekistan (2001)
- Anatoly Karpov, chess grandmaster and former World Champion (2001)
- Alyaksandr Kazulin, Belarusian mathematician, statesman and politician (2001)
- Mohammad Khatami, Iranian statesman, 5th President of Iran (2001)
- Patriarch Kirill of Moscow, Primate of the Russian Orthodox Church (2011)
- Aleksander Kwaśniewski, 3rd President of Poland (2004)
- Václav Klaus, 2nd President of the Czech Republic (2007)
- Rolf-Dieter Kluge, German Slavist (1995)
- Joseph Kobzon, singer, People's Artist of the USSR (2008)
- Andrei Konchalovsky, film director and screenwriter (2017)
- Mikhail Kovalchuk, physicist, Corresponding Member of the Russian Academy of Sciences (2016)
- Salomon Kroonenberg, Dutch geologist (2008)
- Leonid Kuchma, 2nd President of Ukraine (1998)
- Li Lanqing, Chinese politician (2000)
- Alexander Lukashenko, President of Belarus (1996)
- Yury Luzhkov, 2nd Mayor of Moscow (1996)
- Carlos Alfredo Magariños, Argentine politician and UN official (1999)
- Vladislav Malkevich, economist and business executive, donated his art collection to the University (2016)
- Mirjana Marković, Yugoslav politician, widow of Slobodan Milošević (1996)
- Denis Matsuev, classical pianist (2011)
- Gérard Maugin, French engineering scientist (2001)
- Ekaterina Maximova, ballerina (1995)
- Dennis Meadows, American scientist and writer (2004)
- Ruslan Medzhitov, American immunologist (2012)
- Bernd Meyer, German fuel technologist (2015)
- Rustam Minnikhanov, 2nd President of Tatarstan (2016)
- Craig Mundie, American computer scientist, Microsoft executive (2006)
- Arto Mustajoki, Finnish Slavist (1999)
- Yasuhiro Nakasone, Japanese politician, Prime Minister of Japan (1993)
- Nursultan Nazarbayev, 1st President of Kazakhstan (1996)
- Zdeněk Nejedlý, Czech writer, national thinker and statesman (1953)
- Claudio Nicolini, Italian biophysicist (2010)
- Mikhail Nikolayev, 1st President of the Sakha republic in Russia (1996)
- Keizō Obuchi, Japanese politician, 54th Prime Minister of Japan (1998)
- Yury Osipov, mathematician and statesman, President of the Russian Academy of Sciences (1996)
- Aleksandra Pakhmutova, composer, People's Artist of the USSR (2015)
- Maya Plisetskaya, ballerina and choreographer (1993)
- Martyn Poliakoff, British chemist (1999)
- Yevgeny Primakov, arabist, foreign intelligence officer, politician (1998)
- Ernö Pungor, Hungarian chemist (1999)
- Sarvepalli Radhakrishnan, Indian philosopher and statesman, 2nd President of India (1956)
- Emomali Rahmon, 3rd President of Tajikistan (2009)
- Giovanni Reale, Italian historian of philosophy (2002)
- Maria José Ritta, First Lady of Portugal (2001)
- Vladimir Resin, politician, Mayor of Moscow (2002)
- Primo Rovis, Italian businessman, owner of a large collection of minerals; donated part of it to the University of Moscow (2005)
- John William Ryan, American academic administrator (1999)
- Serzh Sargsyan, Armenian politician, 3rd President of Armenia (2011)
- Rodion Shchedrin, composer (2007)
- Alexander Shokhin, politician (2007)
- Manmohan Singh, 13th Prime Minister of India (2005)
- Yury Solomin, actor and culture administrator (2013)
- Sen Sōshitsu XV, Japanese master of tea ceremony (1990)
- Valery Soyfer, Russian-American biophysicist and human rights advocate (2003)
- Vladimir Spivakov, conductor and violinist (2002)
- Klaus Steilmann, German industrialist and writer (2000)
- Sukarno 1st President of Indonesia (1956)
- Yevgeny Svetlanov, conductor, composer, and pianist (1995)
- Oleg Tabakov, actor and theater administrator (2004)
- Valentina Tereshkova, cosmonaut, first woman to fly in space(2013)
- Zurab Tsereteli, sculptor and architect, President of the Russian Academy of Arts (2004)
- Seiji Tsutsumi, Japanese business executive, politician and poet (honorary visiting professor, 1982)
- Slobodan Unković, Serbian economist and academic administrator (1990)
- Vladimir Vasiliev, ballet dancer and choreographer (1995)
- Galina Vishnevskaya, opera singer (2007)
- James Watson, biologist, Nobel Prize (1962)
- Viktor Yanukovych, Ukrainian politician, 4th President of Ukraine (2010)
- Federico Mayor Zaragoza, Spanish scientist, diplomat and poet (1998)
- Xi-Cheng Zhang, Chinese-born American physicist and scientific executive (2012)
- Yuri Zhdanov, chemist, son of Andrei Zhdanov (2003)
- Peter Ziegler, Swiss geologist (1998)
- Heiner Zieschang, German mathematician (1997)
- Lyudmila Zykina, folk singer (2002)
