= Fish (surname) =

Fish is an English surname. Notable people with the surname include:

- Albert Fish (1870–1936), American serial killer, rapist, and cannibal
- Albert Fish (politician) (1922–2006), British-Canadian politician
- Amanda Fish, American singer-songwriter and multi-instrumentalist
- Anne Harriet Fish (1890–1964), British cartoonist and illustrator
- Bert Fish (1875–1943), American judge and ambassador
- Benjamin Fish (born 2004), British esports player
- Bob Fish (NASCAR owner), American race car owner
- Bobby Fish (born 1976), American professional wrestler
- Calvin Fish (born 1961), British racing driver and commentator
- Curtis Fish (Curt Fish), American curler
- Christopher Fish (born 1993), Swedish professional ice hockey player
- Eric Fish (born 1969), stage name of German singer Erik-Uwe Hecht
- Farnum Fish (1896–1978), American aviator
- Fred Fish (1952–2007), American computer programmer
- Frederick Perry Fish (1855–1930), American lawyer
- Ginger Fish (born 1965), stage name of American drummer Kenneth Robert Wilson
- Graeme Fish (born 1997), Canadian speed skater
- Hamilton Fish (disambiguation), multiple people
- Henry Fish (1838–1897), British-New Zealand politician
- Howard Fish, American judoist
- Hugh Fish (1923–1999), English chemist and water manager
- Jack Fish (American football) (1892–1971), American football and baseball coach
- Jack Fish (rugby league) (1878–1940), English rugby league player
- Jacob Fish (born 1956), American academic
- Jasper Fish (18th century), English cricketer
- Jeremy Fish (born 1974), American artist
- John Fish (businessman), American businessman
- John Charles Lounsbury Fish (1870–1962), American civil engineer and educator
- Joseph Fish (Mormon pioneer) (1840–1926), American pioneer
- Leslie Fish (1953–2025), American singer and anarchist
- Mardy Fish (born 1981), American tennis player
- Mark Fish (born 1974), South African footballer
- Mark Fish (composer), American composer
- Mark Fish (writer), American television writer and actor
- Matt Fish (born 1969), American basketball player
- Michael Fish (fashion designer) (1940–2016), British fashion designer
- Michael Fish (born 1944), British weather presenter
- Morris Fish (born 1938), Canadian judge
- Nancy Fish (1850–1927), English socialite
- Nate Fish (born 1980), American baseball player and coach
- Nick Fish (1958–2020), American politician and lawyer
- Phil Fish (born 1984), pen name of French Canadian video game designer Philippe Poisson
- Preserved Fish (1766–1846), American merchant
- Rhiannon Fish (born 1991), Canadian-Australian actress
- Samantha Fish (born 1989), American singer-songwriter and guitarist
- Sidney Webster Fish (1885–1950), American lawyer and rancher
- Simon Fish (died 1531), English religious reformer
- Stanley Fish (born 1938), American literary theorist
- Stuyvesant Fish (1851–1923), American businessman

Fictional characters:

- Billy the Fish, a cartoon strip in the British comic Viz
- Oliver Fish, fictional character on the ABC daytime drama One Life to Live
- Detective Phil Fish, character played by Abe Vigoda on the television series Barney Miller and spinoff Fish
- Richard Fish, character from the television series Ally McBeal
- Fish, the surname of the two main characters in the British-Canadian adult animated series Bob and Margaret

== See also ==
- Fisch (surname)
- Fysh
