= FSHS =

FSHS may refer to:

- Father, Son, and Holy Spirit

== Schools ==
- Fairfax Senior High School, in Los Angeles, California, United States
- Fairmont Senior High School, in Fairmont, West Virginia, United States
- Fargo South High School, in Fargo, North Dakota, United States
- Fort Saskatchewan Senior High School, in Fort Saskatchewan, Alberta, Canada
- Fort Stockton High School, in Fort Stockton, Texas, United States
- Fort Street High School, in Sydney, New South Wales, Australia
- Franklin Senior High School (Louisiana), in Franklin, Louisiana
- Franklin-Simpson High School, in Franklin, Kentucky, United States
- Fremont Senior High School (Nebraska), in Fremont, Nebraska, United States
- Lawrence Free State High School, in Lawrence, Kansas, United States
- National Fengshan Senior High School, in Fengshan District, Kaohsiung City, Taiwan

== See also ==
- FSH (disambiguation)
