= Malkevich =

Malkevich (Belarusian: Малькевіч, Russian: Малькевич) is a surname of Slavic-language origin. Notable people with this surname include:

- Vladislav Malkevich (economist) (1936–2020), Russian economist
- Vladislav Malkevich (footballer) (born 1999), Belarusian footballer
