= Fish doctor =

Fish doctor or Doctor fish may refer to:

- Lycodes terraenovae, also called the Newfoundland eelpout, Atlantic eelpout or fish doctor
- Gymnelus viridis of genus Gymnelus, or fish doctor
- Red garra (Garra rufa), also known as the doctor fish or nibble fish
- Doctorfish tang (Acanthurus chirurgus), also known as the doctorfish
- Tench (Tinca tinca), or doctor fish

== See also ==
- Fish medicine
- Fish (surname)
- Acanthuridae, a family of ray-finned fish which includes surgeonfishes
