= Fisch =

Fisch may refer to:

- Fisch, Rhineland-Palatinate, a municipality in Trier-Saarburg, Germany
- Fisch (surname), a German surname
- Fisch, botanical identifier for Friedrich Ernst Ludwig von Fischer

== See also ==
- Fisch-Ton-Kan, a rench operetta
