= The National Centre "Russia" =

National Center «Russia»
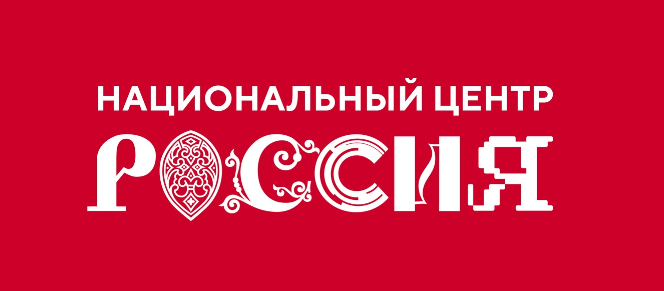
- Interactive map of National Center «Russia»
- Location: Russia, Moscow

The National Centre "Russia" is a permanent exhibition created on the basis of the International Exhibition and Forum "Russia", which took place at VDNKh in 2023–2024. It is located at the Expocentre on Krasnopresnenskaya Embankment in Moscow. It opened on November 4, 2024.

== History ==
On July 1, 2024, Russian President Vladimir Putin ordered to create the National Center "Russia" to preserve the legacy of the "Russia" Exhibition and demonstrate the country's new achievements. On March 26, 2026, during a speech at the congress of the Russian Union of Industrialists and Entrepreneurs, Vladimir Putin launched the construction of a new building for the national center in Moscow.

== Administration ==
The head of the Center's organizing committee was Sergey Kiriyenko, First Deputy Chief of Staff of the Presidential Administration of the Russian Federation, and Natalia Virtuozova, General Director of the National Center "Russia".

== Symbol ==
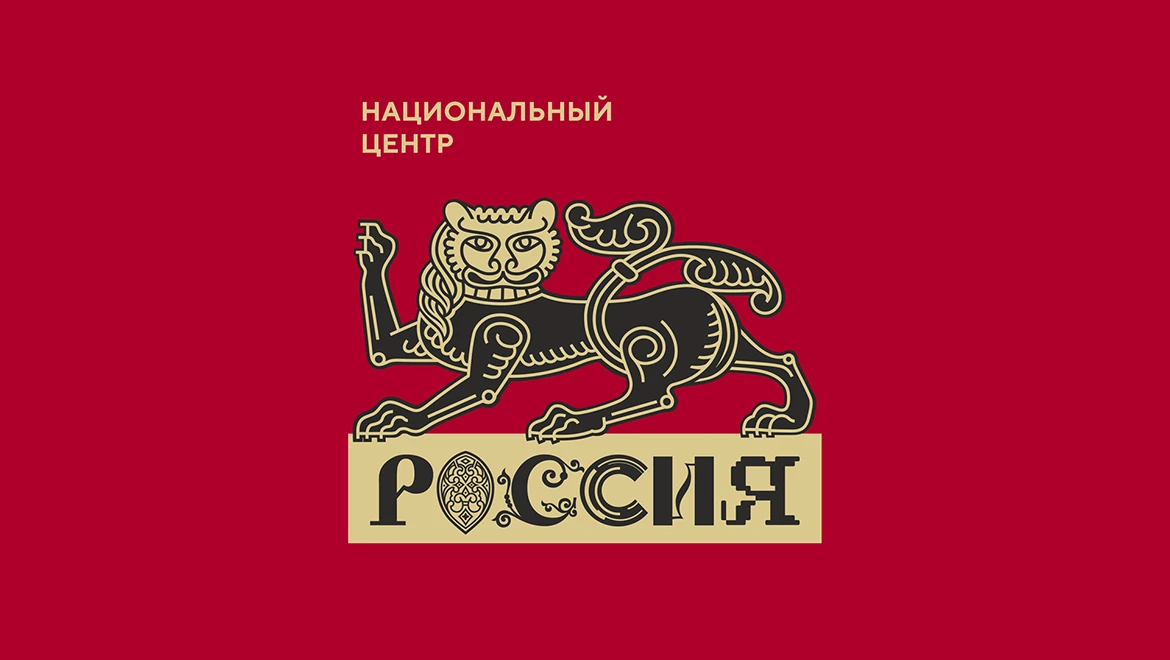
Logo of the National Center "Russia" with a lion

Instead of the traditional Russian bear, the English lion was chosen as the symbol of the National Center "Russia".

== Structure and financing ==
The National Center "Russia" includes a permanent exhibition "Journey through Russia", areas for temporary exhibitions, a congress hall for 600 people, a universal hall for 1,600 people, business areas, a food court with dishes from different regions of Russia, as well as a "Department Store" with folk crafts. The funding of the National Center is provided by the federal budget.

== Complex construction project ==
A grandiose multifunctional complex is planned to be created in the Moscow business district "Moscow-City" on the site of the former exhibition complex "Expocenter" on Krasnopresnenskaya Embankment. The project is to become a new symbol of the country and the main venue for holding exhibitions, forums, concerts and public events of a national scale. The complex will unite under its roof a variety of spaces: about 60 thousand m² of exhibition halls, a modern media center, a congress center for business events, a concert hall for 3,500 spectators, as well as educational and leisure areas for young people. The architectural concept of the center was developed by the "Atrium" bureau and is executed in a futuristic bionic style inspired by images of Russia itself - from snowy expanses to flowing natural landscapes.

== Sanctions ==
On February 24, 2025, the National Center "Russia" and its General Director Natalia Virtuozova were included in the European Union sanctions list.
