= Vladislav Malkevich =

Vladislav Malkevich may refer to:

- Vladislav Malkevich (economist) (1936–2020), Soviet and Russian economist
- Vladislav Malkevich (footballer) (born 1999), Belarusian footballer
