= Fish (nickname) =

As a nickname Fish or The Fish may refer to:

- James Averis (born 1974), English retired cricketer
- Lord William Cecil (bishop) (1863–1936), English Anglican bishop and eccentric
- Ben Fisher (born 1981), Australian rugby league footballer and coach
- Philip Fisher, former drummer and original member of Fishbone (formed 1979), an American alternative rock band
- Steve Fisher (snowboarder) (born 1982), American snowboarder nicknamed "The Fish"
- Tyler Fisher (born 1993), South African rugby union player
- Jon Fishman (born 1965), drummer in the American jam band Phish
- Felicia Hano (born 1998), American artistic gymnast and former trampolinist
- Robert "Fish" Jones (died 1930), American businessman and showman
- Barry Melton (born 1947), guitarist and co-founder of the band Country Joe and The Fish, nicknamed "The Fish"
- Herman Salmon (1913–1980), American barnstormer, air racer and test pilot
- Chris Squire (1948–2015), bassist in the British progressive rock band Yes
- Richard Stannard (triathlete) (born 1974), British triathlete nicknamed "The Fish"

== See also ==
- Fish (disambiguation)
- Fish (surname)
- Derek Fisher (born 1974), American National Basketball Association player nicknamed "D-Fish"
- Benny Bass (1904–1975), American world champion boxer nicknamed "Little Fish"
