= Fishnet (disambiguation) =

Fishnet is hosiery with an open, diamond-shaped knit used as a material for stockings, tights or bodystockings.

Fishnet or fish net may also refer to:

- Fishnet, a vernacular name for the lichen Ramalina menziesii
- Fishing net, a net used for fishing
- "Fishnet" (song), a 1988 single by Morris Day
- Fishnet (novel), a 2015 novel by Kirstin Innes

== See also ==
- FishNet Security, an information security company
- Fish (disambiguation)
- Net (disambiguation)
