= Self-embedding =

Insertion of foreign objects into soft tissues under the skin or into muscle

Self-embedding is the insertion of foreign objects either into soft tissues under the skin or into muscle. Self-embedding is typically considered deliberate self-harm, also known as nonsuicidal self-injury, which is defined as "deliberate, direct destruction of tissues without suicidal intent."

== Controversy ==
Based on the review of the literature it is unclear whether self-embedding falls under the definition of deliberate self-harm. Some studies include self-embedding as a deliberate self-harm behavior while others exclude it. Most definitions of deliberate self-harm include the stipulation that the behavior is performed without conscious suicidal intent. The connection between self-embedding and suicidal ideation is unclear. Although most self-injurious behaviors are not associated with suicidal intentions, self-embedding has been found to be associated with suicidal ideation. A study found that suicidal ideation is the most commonly reported reason for self-embedding, however not all acts of self-embedding are accompanied with suicidal ideations. Additionally, most people that partake in self-embedding behavior report having previous suicidal attempts and suicidal ideations. Other distinctions between self-embedding and other self-injurious behaviors are that self-embedding is highly comorbid with behavioral health diagnoses and has a high prevalence of repetitive behavior. Self-embedding is similar to other forms of self-injury in that one of the purposes of engaging in the behavior is to relieve emotional distress by inflicting physical pain.

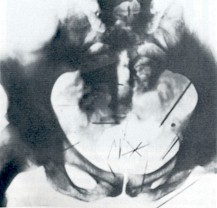
Albert Fish with 27 inserted needles

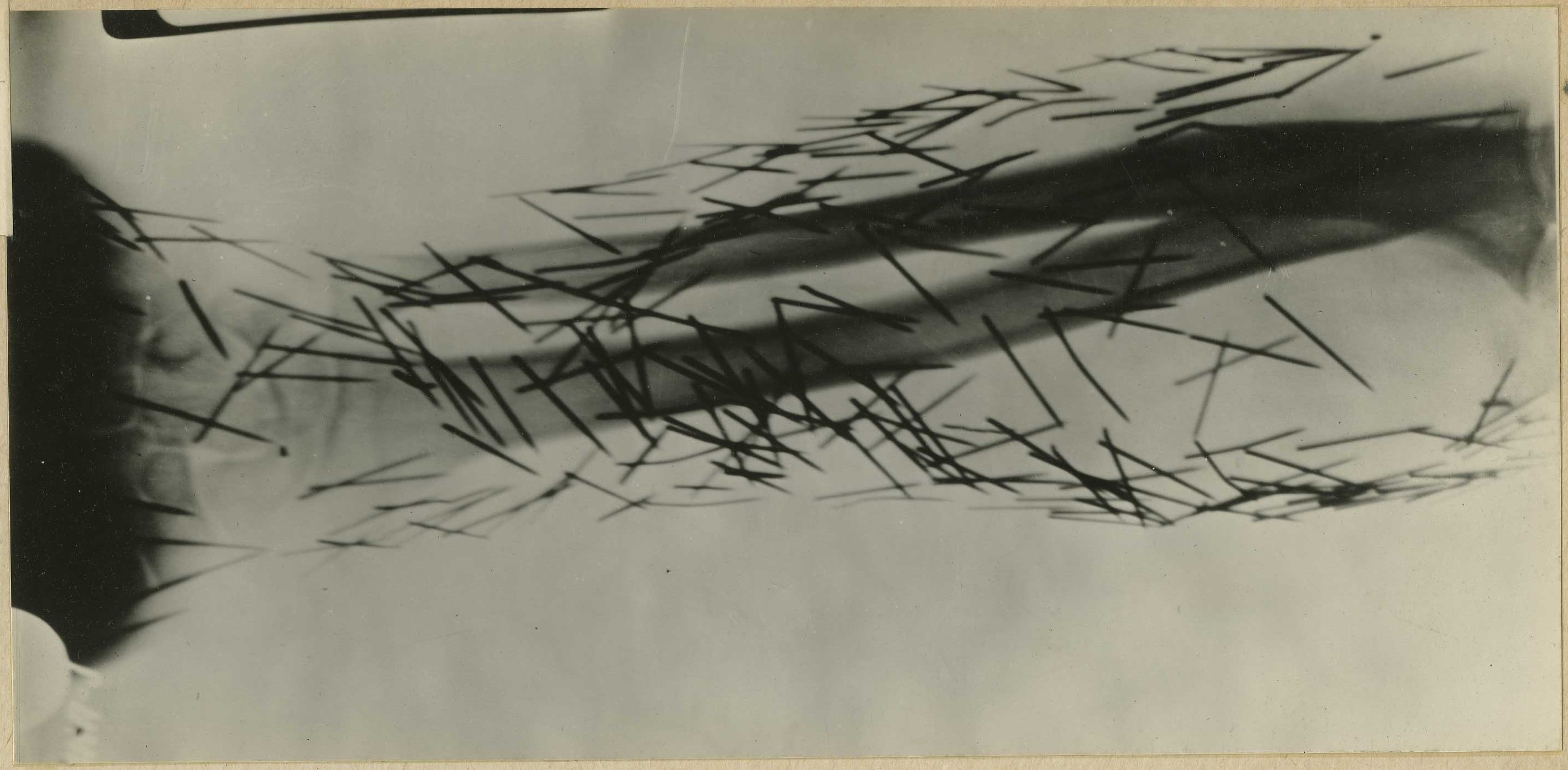
An X-ray image of Graphophone needles driven into the flesh by a psychiatric patient.

== History ==
One of the first reported cases of self-embedding was in 1936 when Albert Fish, a serial killer and cannibal, was caught and executed. An X-ray of his pelvis revealed about 27–29 needles inserted into his groin; the image was used as evidence at his trial. He also embedded needles into his abdomen. In 1986 Gould and Pyle described self-embedding behavior in their book Anomalies and Curiosities of Medicine. They included reports of adult European women with hysteria who self-embedded by inserting needles into their body. In 2010 a study by Young et al. was one of the first to describe self-embedding in an adolescent population.

== Epidemiology ==
The majority of people who engage in self-embedding are white teenage females with psychiatric diagnoses. Self-embedding has a high comorbidity with other psychological disorders such as post-traumatic stress disorder, dissociative disorder, and borderline personality disorder. Additionally, deliberate self-harm is associated with externalizing pathology such as oppositional defiant disorder and conduct disorder. Adolescents who self-injure have higher mean depression scores and report more depressive symptoms than adolescents who do not self-injure. They also report more symptoms of anxiety. Life stressors such as sexual abuse, witnessing family violence or experiencing a traumatic event have also been found to be associated with deliberate self-harm. The frequency and the presence of deliberate self-harm are correlated with the number of stressful life events adolescents report. Adolescents with a history of deliberate self-harm report more stressful life events and those with higher rates for these experiences were more likely to repetitively engage in the behavior. Empirical studies have identified risk factors and correlates for self-injurious behavior. Some of these factors include a history of childhood abuse, the presence of a mental disorder, poor verbal skills, and identifying with Goth subculture.

The mean age for nonsuicidal self-injury is 13–15 years and for suicidal self-injury is 15–17 years of age. About 2% of inmates each year engage in self-injurious behavior, which includes the insertion of foreign objects into the body. The lifetime prevalence rates of deliberate self-harm in adolescence ranges from 13%–56% in non-clinical community samples. Approximately 4% of the United States population and 13–23% of adolescents report a history of nonsuicidal self-injury. The most commonly used objects for insertion are long and thin such as sewing needles and paperclips. Also urethral insertion of foreign objects is more common in males than females with a 1.7:1 ratio.

== Symptoms ==
In order to assess self-embedding different aspects of the behavior must be examined such as the type of object used, the site of insertion, the number of objects inserted, the motivation behind the behavior and if the patient has other psychiatric diagnoses. The most common symptoms for epithelial insertion of foreign objects are infection, abscess formation, or sepsis at the site of insertion. Symptoms of urethral insertion include frequent urination, painful urination, and blood in urination. Urethral stricture can occur with multiple attempts to insert an object into the urethra. Mucosal tears are associated with multiple objects being inserted or with multiple attempts as well. In order to assess the size, location and number of foreign objects a radiological evaluation is needed. Symptoms for vaginal insertion are vaginal pain, discharge, bleeding, and foul odor, which can indicate infection.

== Treatment ==
=== Image guided foreign body removal (IGFBR) ===
To treat urethral insertion of foreign objects endoscopic retrieval is utilized and an antibiotic is given. If there is an infection or abscess formation at the site of insertion, surgical removal of the object is necessary. If a patient has multiple objects inserted in a certain area surgical removal is recommended unless the risks of surgery outweigh the benefits. Percutaneous image guided foreign body removal (IGFBR) is another less invasive option for removing foreign bodies that leaves minimal scarring. Multiple studies have found IGFBR as a safe and effective technique for the removal of foreign bodies. In this procedure hydrodissection can be used to define the foreign body more precisely and facilitate its removal.

=== Psychological treatments ===
Problem-Solving Therapy and Dialectical Behavior Therapy are two empirically supported Cognitive Behavioral Therapies for non-suicidal self-injurious behavior. Problem-Solving Therapy (PST) teaches clients problem-solving skills and general coping strategies so that they can more effectively deal with future problems. Additionally, clients learn to identify and resolve the problems they encounter. The findings for the effectiveness of PST in reducing non-suicidal self-injury have been mixed. Some studies have found that PST has reduced suicidal behaviors compared to usual treatments however maintenance beyond one year was not found.

Dialectical Behavior Therapy (DBT) aims to teach clients general coping skills and address any motivational obstacles to treatment. Therapy includes validating the client's experience and working with the client on problem-solving skills and behavioral skills such as emotional regulation. DBT has been used to treat both suicidal behaviors and non-suicidal self-injurious behaviors. DBT has been shown to reduce self-injurious behaviors in multiple studies.

== Theory ==
=== The Experiential Avoidance Model (EAM) ===
According to this model, the maintenance of deliberate self-harm behavior is due to negative reinforcement. Deliberate self-harm is reinforced because it prevents or takes away negative emotional experiences. The experiential avoidance model was developed to account for deliberate self-harm for various populations not just ones with psychopathology. Experiential avoidance behaviors are those that “function to avoid or escape from unwanted internal experiences." The mechanism for this model involves an individual experiencing an event that evokes an aversive emotional response, which causes the individual to want to escape from that unpleasant emotional state. The individual engages in deliberate self-harm, which reduces or gets rid of the aversive emotional response. This behavior is then negatively enforced. Many studies have found that 80–94% of people report feeling better after engaging in deliberate self-harm, with relief being the most reported. Furthermore, studies done on the self-reported reasons for deliberate self-harm have found that the primary reasons given for engaging in the behavior are related to avoiding, eliminating or escaping internal experiences. A study conducted on female college students investigated emotional responses of women with and without deliberate self-harm and found that women who engage in self-harm reported higher levels of experiential avoidance. Factors that may underlie an increase in experiential avoidance are higher levels of impulsivity or novelty seeking and heightened levels of aversive physiological arousal to emotional events. Other factors include a low tolerance for emotional distress and a failure to use different, less maladaptive behaviors in response to emotional arousal.

The EAM provides multiple hypotheses for how deliberate self-harm provides an emotional escape. The opioid hypothesis explains that deliberate self-harm elicits endogenous opioids, which leads to analgesia and relief of emotional distress. Studies have found elevated levels of opioid peptides in people who engage in deliberate self-harm however, there is not much research supporting an increase in opioid levels after deliberate self-harm. Another explanation could be that individuals who engage in deliberate self-harm have increased activity of the opiate system which can lead to a feeling of dissociation and numbness and deliberate self-harm provides physical pain that ends this dissociative state. An alternative explanation for why deliberate self-harm provides relief is that it shifts attention away from the unpleasant emotions being experienced. Empirical evidence for this hypothesis is mixed; some studies have found distraction to be one of the most common self-reported reasons for engaging in deliberate self-harm while others have found the contrary. The self-punishment hypothesis claims that deliberate self-harm can decrease emotional arousal by confirming an individual's negative self-concepts such as that they are bad or have done something wrong. Multiple studies have found that self-punishment is commonly reported as a reason for engaging in deliberate self-harm. Self-punishment is reinforced because it “alleviates distress associated with negative thoughts about oneself" and has the potential to lessen external punishment.

=== Nock's Theoretical Model ===
Based on his review on the literature on self-injury, Matthew Nock, developed a theoretical model on the development and maintenance of self-injury. According to Nock's model self-injury is performed repeatedly because it is an immediate effective way of influencing one's social environment and regulating one's emotional and cognitive experience. Additionally, factors that contribute to problems in regulating one's affective and cognitive state and influencing one's social environment such as poor social skills lead to an increased risk of self-injury. These general risk factors also increase the likelihood of engaging in other maladaptive behaviors such as alcohol or substance abuse.

This model follows a functional perspective in which behaviors are caused by the events that immediately precede and follow them. Four types of reinforcement processes can maintain self-injury: intrapersonal negative reinforcement, intrapersonal positive reinforcement, interpersonal positive reinforcement, and interpersonal negative reinforcement. Intrapersonal negative reinforcement refers to self-injury being followed by a decrease or stop of aversive thoughts or feelings. Intrapersonal positive reinforcement involves self-injury being followed by an increase in desired thoughts or feelings such as a feeling of satisfaction. Interpersonal positive reinforcement occurs when self-injury is followed by a desired social event such as attention or support. Finally, interpersonal negative reinforcement occurs when self-injury is followed by a decrease or stop of a social event. Many studies investigating the motives reported for engaging in self-injury provide evidence for this four-function model.
