= Hamilton Fish (disambiguation) =

Hamilton Fish (1808–1893) was the 26th United States Secretary of State

Hamilton Fish may also refer to:

- Hamilton Fish II (1849–1936), congressman and son of Hamilton Fish
- Hamilton Fish II (Rough Rider) (1874–1898), grandson of Hamilton Fish, son of Nicholas Fish
- Hamilton Fish III (1888–1991), congressman and son of Hamilton Fish II (1849–1936)
- Hamilton Fish IV (1926–1996), congressman and son of Hamilton Fish III
- Hamilton Fish V (born 1952), congressional candidate, publisher, philanthropist, and son of Hamilton Fish IV

== See also ==
- Hamilton Howard "Albert" Fish (1870–1936), American cannibalistic serial killer, rapist, and kidnapper
- Hamilton Fish Kean (1862–1941), American politician, grandnephew of Hamilton Fish
- Hamilton Fish Armstrong (1893–1973), grandnephew by marriage of Hamilton Fish, U.S. diplomat and editor of Foreign Affairs.
