= Calderón, Quito =

Human settlement, Ecuador

Coordinates: 0.0972222°S 78.4225°W

Calderón is a rural parish and village of Quito Canton, Pichincha Province, Ecuador. It is both Ecuador's, Latin and South America's, all of the Americas', and the world's largest village as its population is 249,941 (250,877 in the rural parish) in the 2022 census. It lies northeast of the city of Quito, on Ecuador Highway 35 (designated by the Ecuadorian transit police as E-35), a north-to-south-running highway which is the Ecuadorian segment of the Pan-American Highway.

The seat of the parish (the village) is particularly known for its cemetery, which attracts visitors during All Souls' Day (November 2), and for its decorative masapán figurines.

== People ==
Elizabeth Vega is a member of the National Assembly.
