= Olga Fisch =

Hungarian artist (1900–1990)

Olga Anhalzer Fisch (Budapest, 1901- Quito, December 30, 1990) was a Bauhaus artist, rug maker, art collector, and gallery owner. Her work is in the collection of the United Nations and has been exhibited at the Museum of Modern Art, Lincoln Center, and The Textile Museum.

Her collection of Ecuadorian art and artifacts was featured in the Renwick Gallery's 1981 exhibition, A Feast of Color: Corpus Christi Dance Costumes of Ecuador.

Fisch, who was Jewish, fled Hungary due to Nazi persecution. She and her husband, Bela, settled in Ecuador in 1939 and opened the gallery, Olga Fisch Folklore, in 1942.

== Early life ==
Fisch was born in Budapest, Hungary in 1901 and lived in the town of Győr, Hungary.

As a child, she collected folk art from Hungarian villages.

Fisch was Jewish.

== Career ==
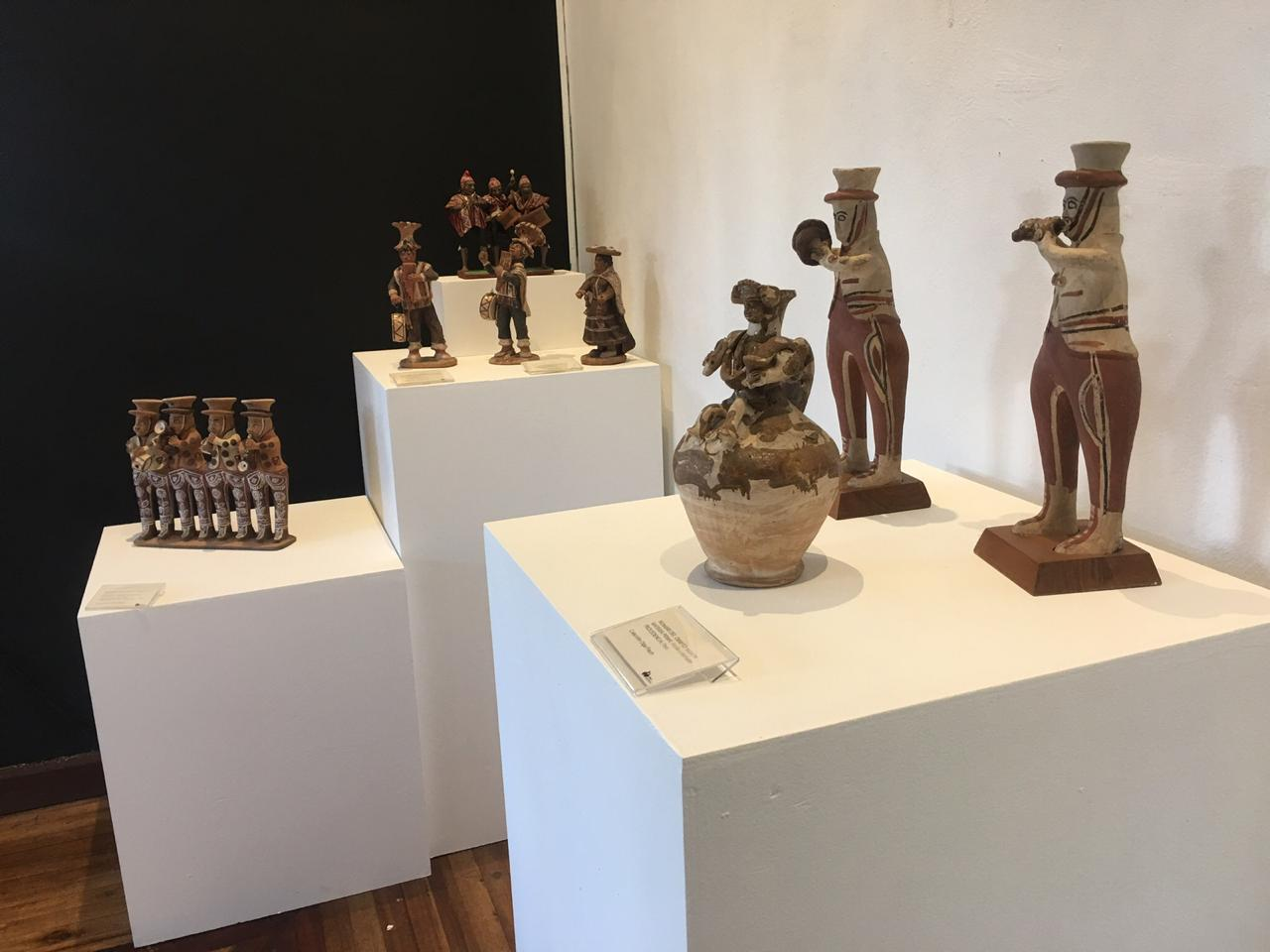
Crafts from the collection of Olga Fisch as exhibited at the Centro interamericano de Artes Populares Museum in Ecuador.

Fisch worked painting ceramics in Vienna, Austria and went on to study painting in Düsseldorf, Germany where she met her first husband, Jupp Rubsam. The couple later divorced.

Fisch and her second husband, Bela, fled Hungary due to Nazi persecution. In 1939, they settled in Quito, Ecuador where Fisch taught at the Quito School of Art.

Fisch became interested in Ecuadorian culture and began collecting folk art created by Indigenous Ecuadorian artisans.

She designed rugs inspired by Ecuadorian culture. The rugs were produced by local weavers.

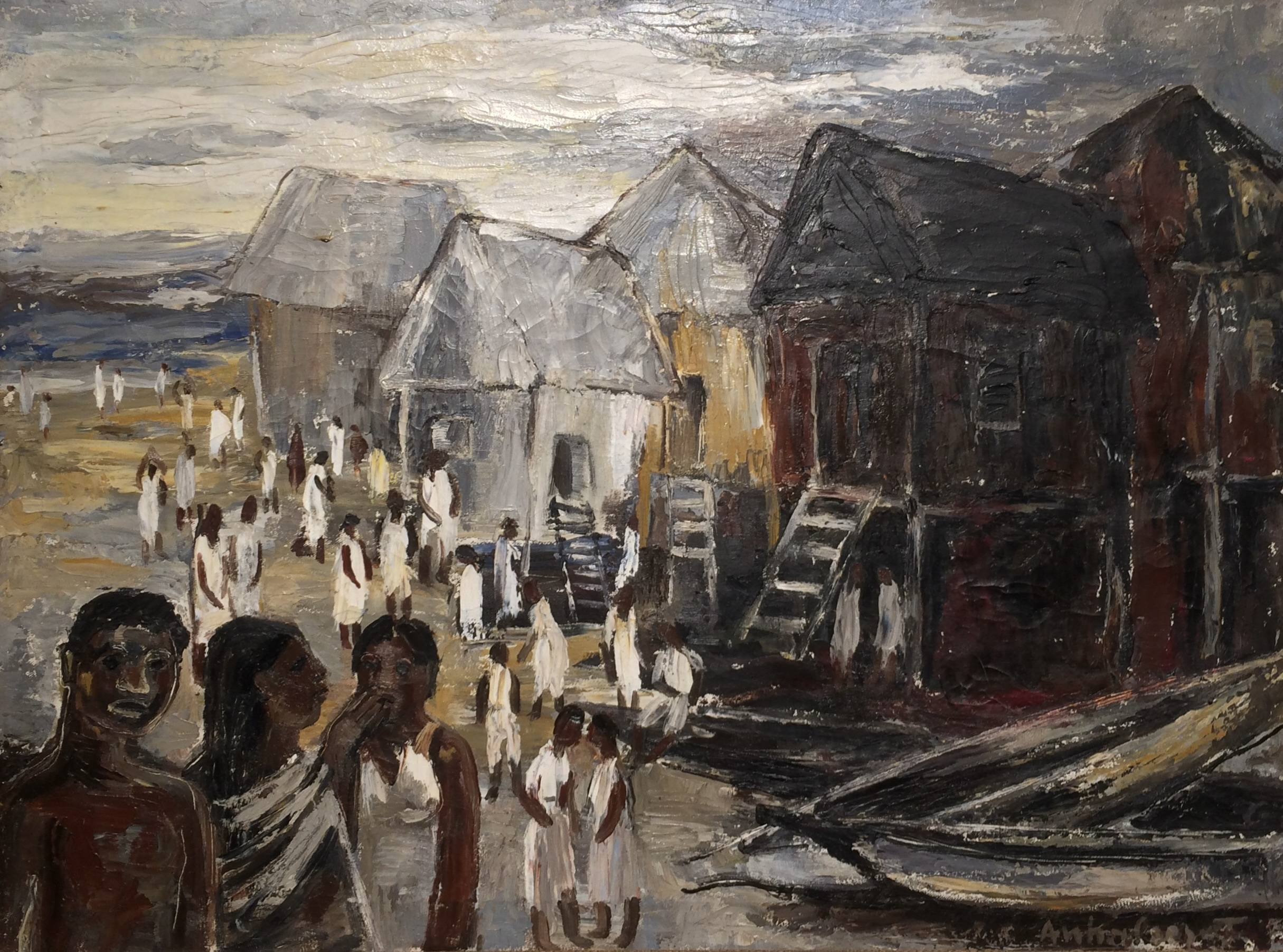
Esmeraldas Landscape, oil painting. MuNa, Quito.

Three months after The Fisches arrived in Quito, they were visited by Lincoln Kirstein of the Museum of Modern Art in New York. Kirstein purchased a rug from Fisch for $300. The couple used the money to open their gallery, Olga Fisch Folklore, where they sold Fisch's works as well folk art and other pieces produced by local artisans.

Fisch compensated the craftspeople who worked for her, as well as the artisans whose worked she sold, with a living wage.

In 1962 Fisch co-founded the Ecuadorian Folklore Institute (Instituto Ecuatoriano de Folklore), she documented the folk art that had received little attention before. She played a key role in the creation of the Inter-American Center for Handicrafts and Popular Arts (Centro Interamericano de Artesanías y Artes Populares) in the mid 1970's, which is now located in Cuenca, Ecudaor. Fisch played an undeniable role in bringing ancient Indigenous art to the attention of Ecuadorian intellectual circles. As late as the mid-20th century, European artistic styles popular half a century earlier remained fashionable in Ecuador, while local folk art was regarded as being of little value. Olga Fisch was instrumental in changing this perception and drawing attention to the value of Ecuadorian folk art, not only through her commercial activities but also by organizing events and documenting folk art. On one occasion when visiting the village of Calderón, Fisch noticed that local residents made small figures out of bread dough called Masapán for the Day of the Dead (Día de los Difuntos), which they then painted and baked. She suggested that they produce these figurines throughout the year, offering to sell them in her shop. Today, Calderón is home to numerous folk artists who make a living producing these bread-dough figures.

As of 2026, Olga Fisch Folklore, also known simply as Olga Fisch or Folklore, is still in operation, with an exhibition celebrating her legacy held between November 7, 2026 and February 21, 2027 at the Centro Cultural Metropolitano titled Olga Fisch: Habitar el Mundo.

== Death ==
Fisch died in Ecuador on December 30, 1990.

== Collections ==
United Nations, Handwoven Ecuadorean Rugs, Acquired February 20, 1956
