= MIDAS Heritage =

Cultural heritage standard

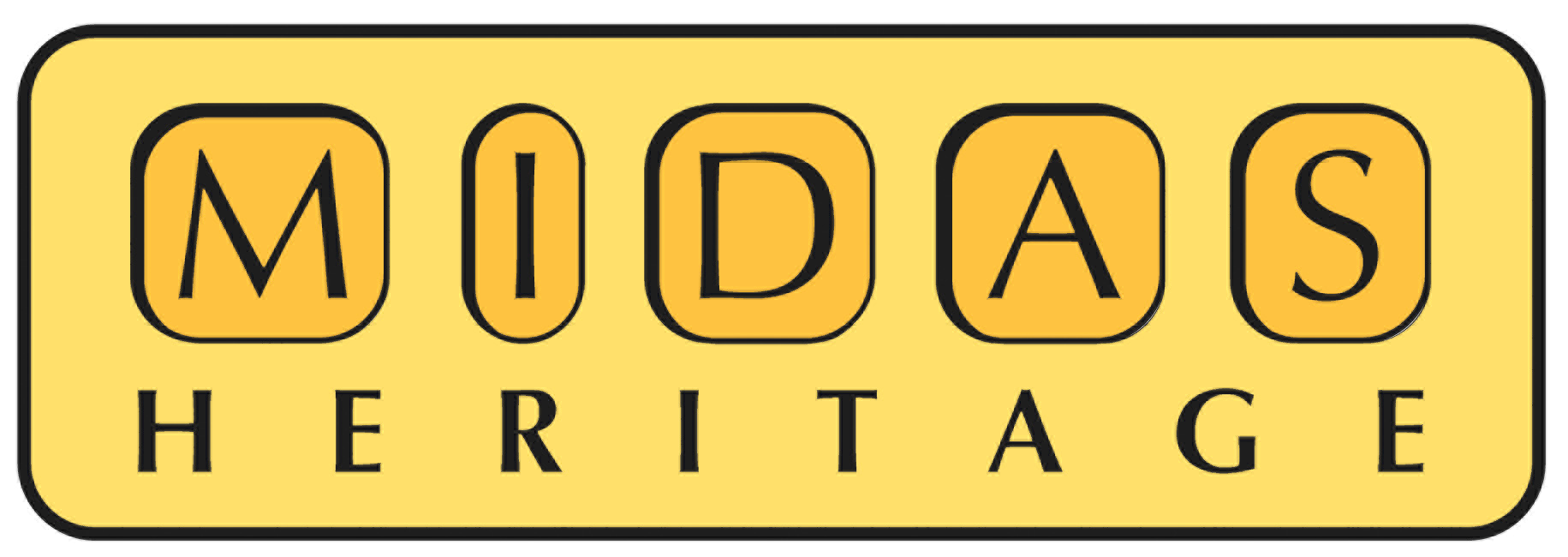
- Purpose: Data Standard for Historic Environment Information
- Official language: English
- Website: http://www.heritage-standards.org.uk/

MIDAS Heritage – the UK Historic Environment Data Standard is a British cultural heritage standard for recording information on buildings, archaeological sites, shipwrecks, parks and gardens, battlefields, areas of interest and artefacts.

The data standard suggests the minimum level of information needed for recording heritage assets and covers the procedures involved in understanding, protecting and managing these assets. It also provides guidelines on how to support effective sharing of knowledge, data retrieval and long-term preservation of data.

MIDAS Heritage is freely available to anyone interested in recording historic environment information. It is used by national government organisations, local authorities, heritage sector organisations, amenity groups and societies, the research community and professional contractors.

== History ==
The first edition of the standard, MIDAS – A Manual and Data Standard for Monument Inventories, was published by the Royal Commission on the Historical Monuments of England (RCHME) in 1998. The organisation merged with English Heritage in 1999 and the updated version, MIDAS Heritage, was published in 2007 in collaboration with other UK heritage organisations. The standard was developed by the Forum on Information Standards in Heritage (FISH), a discussion forum aimed at helping to resolve standards and recording issues for the whole of the heritage sector. A revised version, with more explicit compliance statements, was released in 2012. Following the separation between English Heritage (managing guardianship sites) and Historic England as the strategic historic environment body for England in 2015, responsibility for MIDAS transferred to Historic England.

== Coverage ==
MIDAS Heritage is a set of closely integrated data standards, rather than one single standard. It is designed to be used in conjunction with separate standards covering specific types of applications or projects, which will give the necessary data elements. Examples include SPECTRUM (artefacts), UK Gemini Discovery Metadata Standard (GIS), CIDOC Conceptual Reference Model (concepts and relationships), and Informing the Future of the Past: Guidelines for Historic Environment Records. MIDAS Heritage complies with the UK e-Government Metadata Standard (e-GMS), which is based on Dublin Core.

There are six main themes, each containing several Information Groups, which in turn contain a number of Information Units.

Heritage Asset Theme	Activities Theme	Information Sources Theme	Spatial Information Theme	Temporal Information Theme	Actor Information Theme
Area	Investigative Activity	Archive and Bibliography	Location	Date and Period	Actor and Role
Monument	Designation and Protection	Narrative and Synthesis	Map Depiction	.	.
Artefact and Ecofact	Heritage Asset Management Activity	Management Activity Documentation	.	.	.
.	Casework and Consultation	.	.	.	.
.	Research and Analysis	.	.	.	.
.	Historical Event	.	.	.	.

The standard aims only to provide a common information framework and does not cover: what software or file format to use; what to call fields and tables in a database and how they are designed; what indexing terms to use; how to record archives and museum collections, or how to redesign an existing information system.
