= Jacob Fish =

Jacob Fish is a researcher and professor in computational mechanics. He was the Rosalind and John J. Redfern Jr. Chaired Professor of Mechanical and Aeronautical Engineering at Rensselaer Polytechnic Institute and director of RPI's Multiscale Science and Engineering Center. He is currently the Robert A. W. and Christine S. Carleton Professor in Civil Engineering at Columbia University.

== Career and research ==
Fish received his B.S. from Technion – Israel Institute of Technology, Israel in 1982. He obtained his Ph.D. in theoretical and applied mechanics from Northwestern University in 1989. Over his 30 years of research, Fish has focused on multiscale science and engineering with applications to aerospace, automotive industry, civil engineering, biological and material sciences. His projects include life prediction and durability of structural components made of composites, concrete, and nanomaterials. He has published over one hundred journal articles and book chapters. His 2007 book, A First Course in Finite Elements, was released and has been integrated into curriculums at more than 50 universities across the globe including Stanford University and Imperial College.

Fish has been the Editor-in-Chief of the International Journal for Multiscale Computational Engineering. He has also been an editorial board Member of International Journal for Multiscale Computational Engineering and International Journal for Computational Methods in Engineering Science & Mechanics. He served as the Associate Editor of Journal of Engineering Mechanics, editor of the Bulletin of United States Association for Computational Mechanics. He chaired the ASCE Computational Mechanics committee. Fish has directed the National Science Foundation Nanoscale Interdisciplinary Research Teams program at Rensselaer. He is the past President of United States Association for Computational Mechanics, past member of the National Research Council for the Air and Ground Vehicle Technology. Fish is currently on the IUTAM Working Party on Computational Fluid and Solid Mechanics.

== Awards ==
In 2005, Fish received the USACM Computational Structural Mechanics Award. Fish is a fellow of American Academy of Mechanics, United States Association for Computational Mechanics (USACM) and the International Association for Computational Mechanics (IACM).

In 2010, he received the prestigious IACM Computational Mechanics Award for his sustained and important contributions to computational mechanics, relevant to applications such as the structural integrity of mechanical, aerospace and civil systems, electronic packaging, nanostructured material systems, biological systems, and energy absorption systems.
