= Hans Ulrich Fisch =

Swiss painter (1583–1647)

- Born: 22 September 1583; Aarau, Switzerland
- Died: 10 November 1647 (aged 64); Aarau, Switzerland
- Known for: Painting, glass painting, heraldry, book illustration

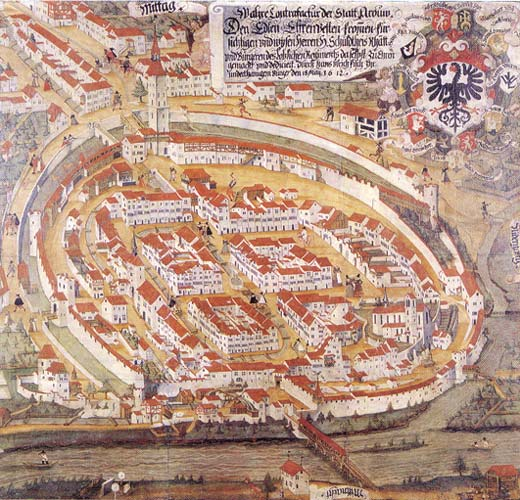
Historic view of Aarau from the north, drawn by Fisch in 1612

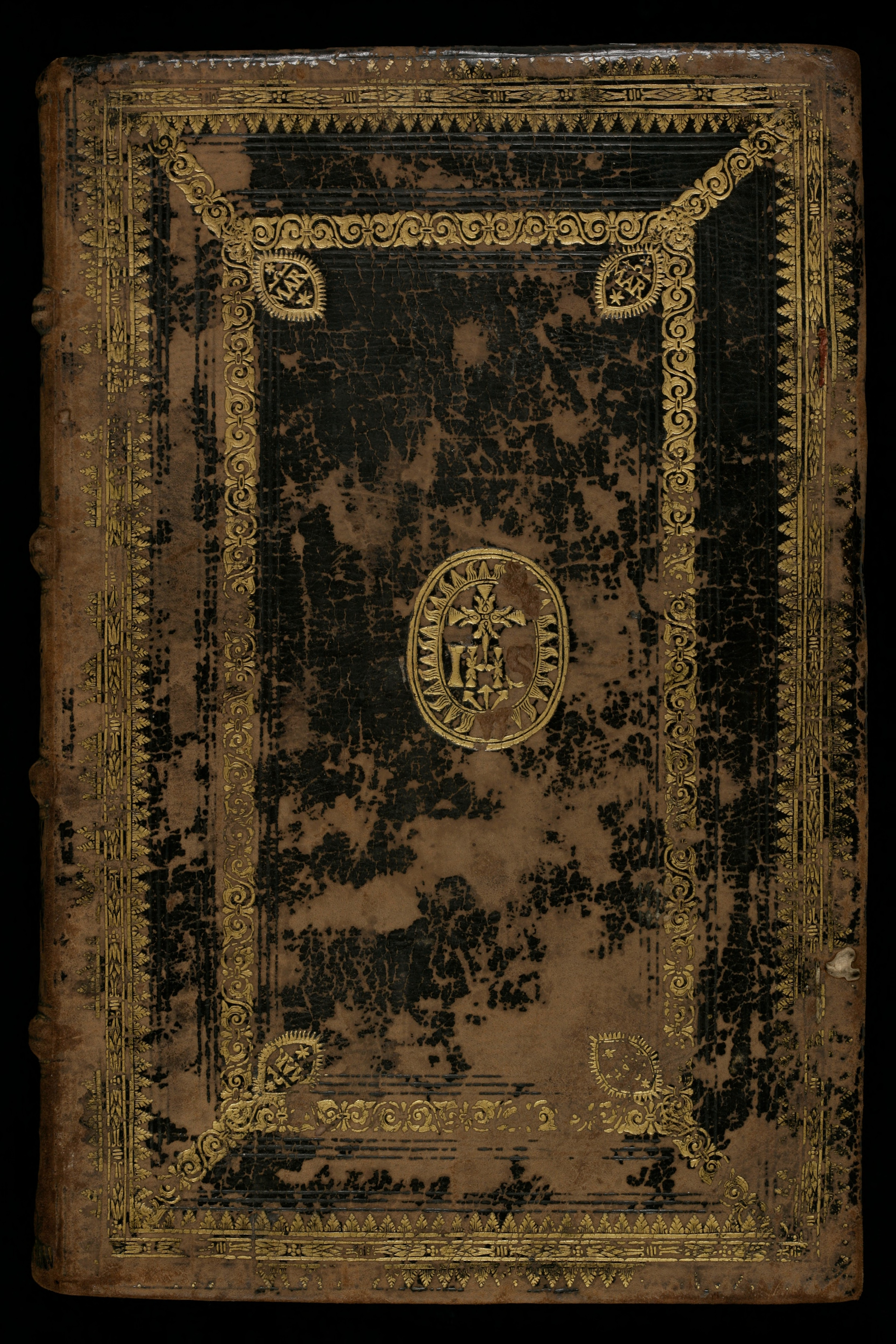
Front cover of Fisch’s heraldry guide

Hans Ulrich Fisch (22 September 1583 – 10 November 1647) was a Swiss painter and glass painter. Based in Aarau, he worked as a heraldist and book illustrator. His output included stained-glass works, heraldic panels, books of coats of arms and city views. He held several public offices in Aarau, including town clerk from 1644.

== Biography ==
Hans Ulrich Fisch was born in Aarau on 22 September 1583.

His earliest documented work as a painter was decorative work at Schenkenberg Castle in 1606. He later held several public offices in Aarau, serving on the Great Council from 1623 and the Small Council from 1633. In 1634, he became a judge in Aarau’s matrimonial court, and in 1644 he was appointed town clerk of Aarau. He died in Aarau on 10 November 1647.

== Work ==
Fisch worked as a painter, draughtsman, book illustrator and glass painter. He was also active as a heraldist and topographer. Glass painting was his principal field of work.

His practice included panel painting, façade decoration and city views. He designed stained-glass works and also made many of the panels himself, with heraldic panels forming an important part of his output. Fisch compiled several books of coats of arms, including works for Bern, Zofingen and Aargau.

In 1612, Fisch completed a bird's-eye view of Aarau, seen from the north, which is now in Stadtmuseum Aarau. Among his surviving stained-glass works are a group of six panels from the cloister of Wettingen Abbey, dated 1620–1621, and eight panels from the church at Gontenschwil, dated 1622. Around the middle of the 17th century, Fisch was among the most active glass painters in the present-day cantons of Aargau and Bern.

Examples of his work are held by Stadtmuseum Aarau, the Bernisches Historisches Museum, the University Library of Basel and the Wettingen Abbey.
