= Networks and Heterogeneous Media =

- Discipline: Mathematics
- Language: English
- Edited by: Benedetto Piccoli

Publication details
- History: 2006-present
- Publisher: American Institute of Mathematical Sciences (United States)
- Frequency: Bimonthly
- Open access: Yes
- Impact factor: 1.3 (2024)

Standard abbreviations
- ISO 4: Netw. Heterog. Media

Indexing
- ISSN: 1556-1801 (print); 1556-181X (web)
- LCCN: 2005214858
- OCLC no.: 60455896

Links
- Journal homepage

Networks and Heterogeneous Media is a peer-reviewed academic journal published bimonthly by AIMS Press, an operation of the American Institute of Mathematical Sciences. The journal was established in 2006 and focuses on networks, heterogeneous media, and related fields. The editor-in-chief is Benedetto Piccoli (Rutgers University).

== Abstracting and indexing ==
The journal is abstracted and indexed in Zentralblatt MATH, MathSciNet, Scopus, Current Contents/Physical, Chemical & Earth Sciences, and Science Citation Index Expanded. According to the Journal Citation Reports, the journal has a 2013 impact factor of 0.952.
