= Paul Irwin =

Paul G. Irwin is the current president and CEO of Elephants in Crisis, former president of the American Bible Society (2005 – June 2008) and former host of American Bible Society Presents. Prior to that, he was president of the Humane Society of the United States (HSUS) between 1975 and 2004.

Irwin is an ordained minister of the United Methodist Church and taught for six years at the Boston University School of Theology.

== Controversy ==
In 1996, the Humane Society of Canada (as an affiliate of HSUS) filed a lawsuit alleging that Irwin and other HSUS officials transferred $1 million from their account to HSUS without authorization. They also alleged HSUS "took its donor list, and overcharged for administrative costs." In January 1997, a Canadian judge ruled in favor of the Humane Society of Canada, writing: "I cannot imagine a more glaring conflict of interest or a more egregious breach of fiduciary duty. It demonstrates an overweening arrogance of a type seldom seen."

Irwin's tenure as president at the American Bible Society (ABS) ended after his contract was not renewed by the organization's trustees. He was placed on paid leave (along with chief financial officer Richard B. Stewart, Jr.) after an article in The New York Times linked him with Richard J. Gordon, a web consultant hired by ABS, who was a convicted felon with ties to online pornography and gambling enterprises. At that time, it was revealed by USA Today that, while president of the Humane Society, Irwin used $85,000 of Humane Society money for renovate a home in Maine in 1987. In April 2003, the Humane Society paid $881,000 to Gordon's Exciting New Technologies (ENT) company; ENT hired Irwin's son (Christopher) as director of business development. As president of ABS, Irwin hired Exciting New Technologies again, paying the company more than $5,000,000 for Web design, e-mail marketing, and digitizing the Bible.

== Selected publications ==
Losing Paradise: The Growing Threat to Our Animals, Our Environment, and Ourselves (2000) Garden City Park, NY: Square One Publishers, ISBN 0-7570-0003-7.
