= The Fish (poem) =

Poem

The Fish is a 1918 poem by the American poet Marianne Moore. The poem was published in the August 1918 issue of The Egoist. Moore's biographer, Linda Leavell, has described "The Fish" as "...one of Moore's best-loved and most mystifying poems" and that it is "Admired for its imagery and technical proficiency". The poem was later included in Moore's 1921 collection Observations, where it appeared alongside "Reinforcements". The placing of the two poems in the book has been interpreted by critic John Slatin as a commentary by Moore on World War I, due to her brother's service as a chaplain in the United States Navy.

== Background ==
"The Fish" was written following Moore's holiday with her mother, Mary, and her brother John to Monhegan, Maine, in the Summer of 1917. The trip also inspired her poem "A Grave". John Warner Moore met his future wife, Constance, on the trip, and subsequently broke off a previous engagement to another woman, Alice Benjamin Mackenzie. Mary Moore and her children were extremely close, and Mary and Marianne were especially upset by John's actions. John later wrote to his mother that "My crime...is that while I would count it nothing to die for you, I have refused to live for you".

== Analysis ==
The first line of "The Fish" is formed by the poem's title.
