= Masapán =

Masapán sculpting is a special craft technique associated with the town of Calderón, Quito in Ecuador. It is an art form from where beautiful and detailed figurines are created from a bread dough mixture. These figurines can be anything from fruits, animals, people, ornaments, nativity scenes, etc.

== History ==
Masapán literally translates into masa (dough) pán (bread). Women in and around the region of Calderón, Ecuador have been making dough art for generations as a holiday tradition. The recipe for the mixture is simple. It is a combination of wheat flour, white glue, and water. This recipe varies from family to family and is kept secret as it is passed down from generation to generation. Beginning around 1940 they began selling their figurines in local shops.

== Technique ==
The dough is hand rolled and sculpted with small tools, knives, and toothpicks. The sharp points of the tools are ideal for the details the figurines are known for. They are then set to air dry for days or weeks before they are meticulously painted.

== Production ==
A skilled artisan can make about 300 figurines in one day. In a month a shop typically makes about 20,000. Prices range between a quarter to $10 depending on the size. They are sold year-round but are extremely popular on November 2, the Day of the Dead and Christmas time. Recently there has a surge of interest in these figurines from people living in the United States and Europe. Many of the shops now spend time filling large orders and exporting the figurines to these countries.
