= International Journal for Multiscale Computational Engineering =

- Discipline: Engineering
- Language: English
- Edited by: Jacob Fish

Publication details
- Publisher: Begell House
- Frequency: Bimonthly
- Impact factor: 1.4 (2018)

Standard abbreviations
- ISO 4: Int. J. Multiscale Comput. Eng.

Indexing
- ISSN: 1543-1649 (print); 1940-4352 (web)

Links
- Journal homepage

The International Journal for Multiscale Computational Engineering (ISSN 1543-1649) is a bimonthly scientific journal of engineering published by Begell House. It covers modeling, simulation, and design of products based on multiscale principles aimed at reducing prototyping costs and time to market. The editor-in-chief is Jacob Fish. According to the Journal Citation Reports, the journal's 2009 impact factor is 0.734, ranking it 39th out of 79 journals in the category "Engineering, Multidisciplinary" and 54th out of 80 in the category "Mathematics, Interdisciplinary Applications". As of 2024, the Journal Impact Factor is 1.4, ranking the International Journal for Multiscale Computational Engineering in the third quartile of the aforementioned categories.
