= Walter Fisch =

German politician (1910–1966)

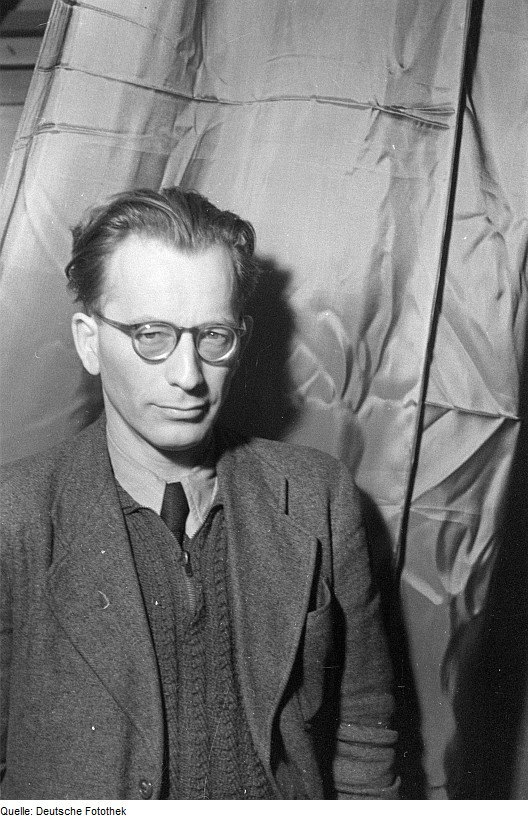
- Walter Fisch (1946)

Member of the Bundestag
- In office 7 September 1949 – 7 September 1953

Personal details
- Born: 16 February 1910 Heidelberg
- Died: 21 December 1966 (aged 56)
- Party: KPD

Walter Fisch (16 February 1910, Heidelberg – 21 December 1966) was a German politician and activist associated with the Communist Party (KPD) and former member of the German Bundestag.

Born in Heidelberg, Fisch became engaged in left-wing politics at an early age and was active in the workers’ movement during the turbulent years of the Weimar Republic. His political involvement led to periods of repression under the Nazi regime, during which many KPD members were arrested or forced into underground activity.

After the Second World War, Fisch played a role in the reorganization of the Communist Party in West Germany. He served as a member of the Bundestag from 1949 to 1953, representing the KPD during the first legislative period of the Federal Republic of Germany. Within parliament, he was known for advocating socialist policies and opposing West Germany’s alignment with NATO during the early Cold War years.

Fisch remained committed to his political beliefs until his death on 21 December 1966.

== Life ==
From 1949 to 1953 he was a member of the first German Bundestag.

== Literature ==
Herbst, Ludolf; Jahn, Bruno (2002). Vierhaus, Rudolf (ed.). Biographisches Handbuch der Mitglieder des Deutschen Bundestages. 1949–2002 [Biographical Handbook of the Members of the German Bundestag. 1949–2002] (in German). München: De Gruyter - De Gruyter Saur. p. 1715. ISBN 978-3-11-184511-1.
