= Christopher Fish =

Swedish ice hockey player

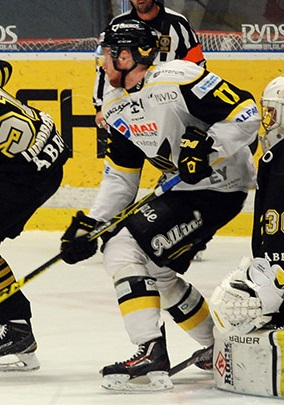
- Born: March 25, 1993 (age 32) Örebro, Sweden
- Height: 6 ft 2 in (188 cm)
- Weight: 207 lb (94 kg; 14 st 11 lb)
- Position: Right wing
- Shoots: Right
- Allsv team Former teams: VIK Västerås HK; Linköpings HC
- Playing career: 2011–present

Christopher Fish (born March 25, 1993) is a Swedish professional ice hockey player who currently plays for VIK Västerås HK in the HockeyAllsvenskan. He has previously played for Linköpings HC in the Swedish Hockey League (SHL).
