= Fysh =

Fysh is a surname. Notable people with the surname include:

- Philip Fysh (1835–1919), Australian politician
- Hudson Fysh (1895–1974), Australian aviator and businessman
- Marcus Fysh (born 1970), British politician
- Carl Fysh, member of British boy band Brother Beyond
