= FSH =

FSH may refer to:

== Medicine ==
- Follicle-stimulating hormone, a hormone that affects the reproductive system
- Facioscapulohumeral muscular dystrophy, a disease that causes progressive impairment of muscles

== Companies ==
- Fisher Scientific, a defunct American scientific equipment supplier
- Flash Airlines, an Egyptian airline
- Four Seasons Hotels and Resorts, a Canadian hospitality management company
- Fox Sports Houston, a regional Fox Sports Net television station

== Other ==
- Fukuoka SoftBank Hawks, Japanese professional baseball team
- FastTrack Scripting Host, a software product for Windows operating systems
- fish (Unix shell), an "exotic" Unix operating system shell
- Florida State Hospital
