= Vladislav Malkevich (economist) =

Russian economist (1936–2020)

General Director, Expocentre ZAO
- In office 2002–2012

Head, Russian Federal Service for Currencies an Exports Control
- In office 1988–2000

President, Chamber of Commerce and Industry of the USSR
- In office 1988–1992

First Deputy Minister for Foreign Trade
- In office 1983–1988

Head, Main Policy Division for New Technology & Innovation Oriented Trade of the Ministry for Foreign Trade of the USSR
- In office 1971–1983

Ministry for Radio Industry of the USSR, a defense plant: Tune Up Engineer, Foreman, Shop Chief, Deputy Chief Engineer; CRITI (Central Research Institute in Technology): Chief Engineer – Deputy Director for Research
- In office 1971–1983

Personal details
- Born: Vladislav Leonidovich Malkevich; June 30, 1936 Yasynuvata, Ukrainian SSR, Soviet Union
- Died: July 6, 2020 (aged 84) Moscow, Russia
- Education: University Degree of the Moscow Power Engineering Institute (1959); the All-Union Academy of Foreign Trade (1978); Doctor of Technical Sciences (1968); Doctor of Economics (1982)
- Profession: Area of Research: International Economic Relations

Vladislav Leonidovich Malkevich (Russian: Владислав Леонидович Малькевич; 30 June 1936 – 6 July 2020) was a Soviet and Russian economist.

He was General Director of Expocentre ZAO (from November 2002 to March 2012), member of the Board of Directors of UFI – the Global Association of Exhibition Industry (2003), Vice President of RUEF – the Russian Union of Exhibitions and Fairs (2003), member of the International Academy of Business (2001), member of the International Academy of Creative Endeavors (1999).

== Education and academic degrees ==
Malkevich has a degree form the Moscow Power Engineering Institute (1959), the All-Union Academy of Foreign Trade (1978). Malkevich is also a Doctor of Technical Sciences (1968) and Doctor of Economics (1982).

== Biography ==
Vladislav Leonidovich Malkevich was born in Yasynuvata. His father Leonid Petrovich Malkevich served as Chief of the South Urals Railroads. Vladislav's mother was a teacher of the Russian language and literature.

=== Years in Radio Engineering ===
Vladislav graduated from Moscow Power Engineering Institute in 1959 majoring in radio technology. Under the system of job distribution at the time, he was sent to work at a defence plant under the Ministry for Radio Industry of the USSR. His positions were: Equipment Tune-Up Engineer and later Foreman. Soon after Malkevich was promoted to the position of head of the section in charge of onboard equipment for strategic rockets. Those were installed at strategic launching pads manned by special units of the Soviet Army throughout the Country. Later he was put in charge of two assembly shops at the Plant. That was the time he was awarded his first medal from the Government: “For Work Excellence”.

In 1963 Malkevich was appointed Deputy Chief Engineer of the same plant, thus going from a rank and file engineer up to a Deputy Chief Engineer of a major defence plant in only 4 years. From 1966 to 1971 Malkevich was Chief Engineer, Deputy Director for Research of the Central Research Institute for Technology of the Ministry for Radio Industry of the USSR.

=== Move to Ministry for Foreign Trade ===
In 1971 Malkevich was offered the position of the Head of a major trade policy division of the Ministry for Foreign Trade in charge of new technology/innovation-related issues (GITU). While at the Ministry, Vladislav Malkevich had a very close working relationship with then Minister for Foreign Trade Nikolai Patolichev. As the First Deputy Minister for Foreign Trade and later President of the Chamber of Commerce and Industry of the USSR Malkevich chaired the Soviet Side of the American-Soviet and Japanese-Soviet Trade/Economic Councils.

In 1988 Malkevich became President of the Chamber of Commerce and Industry of the USSR, a position he held until 1992. As a major national public entity, the CCI had great powers in setting up direct links with foreign companies, helping “defrost” relations with Israel, SAR, South Korea and pioneering in a relationship that preceded formal diplomatic ties with those countries when proper embassies are set up. Under Malkevich's leadership, the CCI of the USSR was vigorously developing local chambers of commerce and industry in autonomous republics and regions of Russia.

=== Currency and Exports Control ===
From 1992 to 1998 Malkevich worked at commercial entities in Russia.

There came a time when Malkevich's record of a successful government executive was in great demand again to help in the national effort to uplift the country's economy. In 1998 he was offered to head the Russian Federal Service for Currencies and Exports Control (VEK). His organization managed to help curb the outflow of capital from the country working in close contact with the Central Bank of the Russian Federation and cold start the economy on a revival cycle. In 1999 a new law on export control was passed by the parliament drafted with the direct participation of Malkevich. The law is still active today however it is mildly adjusted from its original form.

=== Expocentre ZAO ===
In 2002 Vladislav Malkevich was appointed Chief Executive (General Director) of Expocentre ZAO starting a new cycle of success in the company's history scoring more than twofold growth in its gross revenue figures and over 1.8 fold increase in productivity as a result of considerable expansion of Expocentre's exhibitions and conventions programs. Expocentre is the only exhibition entity to-date that has been awarded a special prize of the Government of the Russian Federation for Quality which it received in 2009.

Under Malkevich's leadership Expocentre achieved results which were noted by many awards, the Golden Mercury national prize in 2005 and 2011; the international prize: Leader of Economic Development of Russia in 2006 and: For Contribution in the Doubling of GNP-2007. The international prizes it won were the 2008 European Quality award and the “Socrates Prize” in the nomination Economy and Business also in 2008 were awarded to Expocentre in Oxford, UK.

Expocentre is engaged in charity projects, promoting ideas of preservation and restoration of Russian spiritual life and cultural traditions. A church dedicated to Reverend Serafim Sarovsky has been built on Expocentre Fairgrounds (the first church in Russia built on the premises of an exhibition venue). Expocentre helps the development of the Ladia project, which is a unique show of Russian crafts. Expocentre is the general sponsor of the Kostroma National Dancing Company.

In 2011 he handed over his collection of art made of over 200 pieces of painting and graphics as a gift to Expocentre.

== Personal life ==
Malkevich had two daughters, a grandson, and a granddaughter.

He died in Moscow after a prolonged illness, aged 84.

== Awards and honors ==
- Order "For Merit to the Fatherland", 4th class
- Order of Lenin
- Order of the Red Banner of Labour
- Order of Friendship of Peoples
- Medal "For Labour Valour"
