= Expocentre =

Russian exhibition and conference company

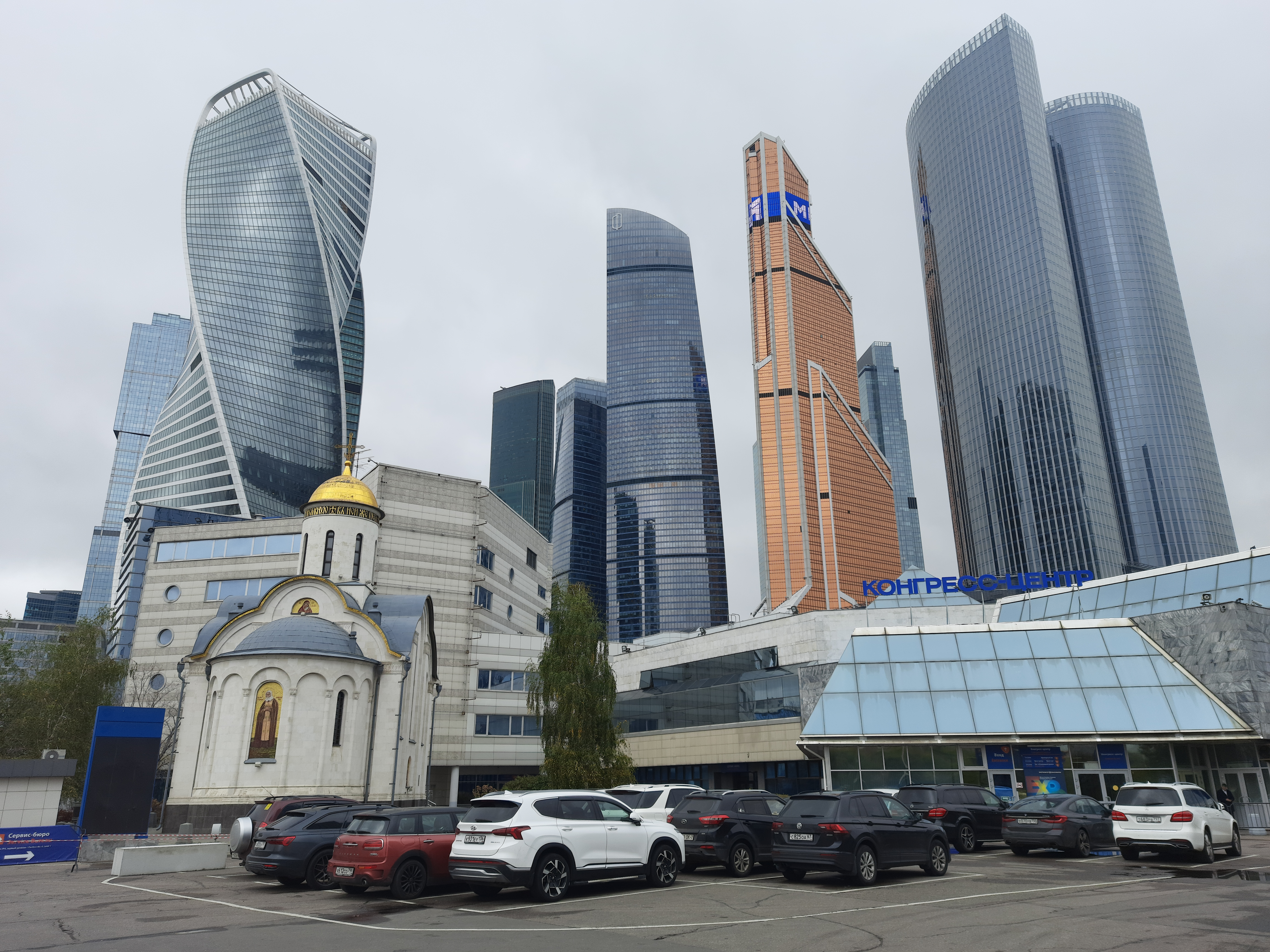
- The Expocentre Fairgrounds exhibition center in 2024.

Expocentre (Russia)

Expocentre is a Russian exhibition and conference company, headquartered in Moscow, that stages international trade shows in Russia, the CIS countries, Central Europe, and Russian national pavilions at EXPOs (World Fairs). It owns and operates Expocentre Fairgrounds, an exhibition venue located in the Central Administrative Area of Moscow.

== History ==
The predecessor of Expocentre was the Division of International and Foreign Exhibitions in the USSR, which succeeded the Department of Foreign Exhibitions under the All-Union Chamber of Commerce of the USSR.

In 1959, Sokolniki Park in Moscow hosted the first national exhibition of US industrial products, opened by Nikita Khrushchev and Richard Nixon. Exhibitions from other nations such as Bulgaria, Czechoslovakia, Hungary, Poland, and Romania followed.

In 1964, Expocentre produced its first international trade show called Stroidormash (the Road-Building Machinery Show), which put on display new road-building machinery and equipment. It had been co-organized by the National Committee for Construction, Road-Building, and Utilities Engineering under the USSR Ministry of Construction.

During the next decades, it hosted events for other sectors of the Soviet economy, including Khimia (chemicals), Sviaz (telecommunications), Lesdrevmash (timber), Elektro (electrical), Neftegaz (oil and gas), and Inlegmash (textile).

To accommodate more trade shows, a new pavilion was opened in 1977 on the banks of the Moskva River next to Krasnaya Presnya Park. In January of the following year, it held its first show, Derevoobrabotka (woodworking).

== Name ==
The company name Expocentre was registered in 1977, as the Agency for International and Foreign Exhibitions in the USSR had been turned into the Expocentre Company (a National Company since 1980).

== Timeline ==
- In 1945, a new committee was set up within the USSR Chamber of Trade, called a Standing Committee on Exhibitions, and in 1947 on its basis, a Department for Foreign Exhibitions (the Exhibitions Department since 1949) was established.
- In 1969, the USSR Chamber of Commerce set up the Agency for International and Foreign Exhibitions consisting of the Department for Foreign Exhibitions, Department for International Exhibitions, and other units.
- In 1991, Expocentre became a joint stock company.

== Drone attack ==
On 18 August 2023, Expocentre sustained damage to one of its walls by what Mayor Sergei Sobyanin says was caused by a drone that was shot down by the Russian military. As a result of the drone being shot down, debris from the drone fell and caused damage to the building. People in the nearby area report hearing an explosion.

== Directors ==
- 1959–1964 Aleksandr V. Saag
- 1964–1970 Konstantin I. Smolyaninov
- 1970–1977 Khachik G. Oganesyan
- 1973–1977 Aleksandr K. Pavlenko
- 1977–1979 Lev K. Garusov
- 1979–1984 Vladimir M. Korsikov
- 1984–1990 Stanislav V. Mikhailov
- 1990–2002 Igor S. Denisov
- 2002–2012 Vladislav L. Malkevich
- 2012–2021 Sergei S. Bednov
- 2021–2024 Alexey G. Vyalkin
- 2024–present Present Maxim A. Fateev

== Partners ==
Expocentre cooperates with multiple Russian and International groups, including the Russian Ministry of Energy and the Russian Ministry of Industry and Trade.
