= Albert Fish =

American serial killer and rapist (1870–1936)

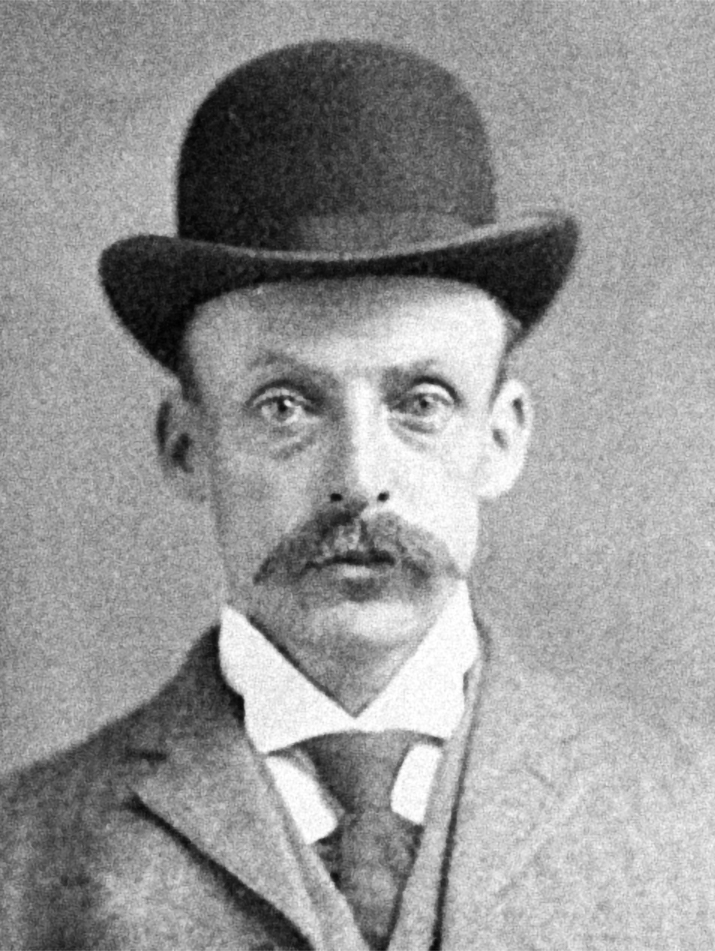
- Fish's mug shot after his arrest for grand larceny in 1903
- Born: Hamilton Howard Fish; May 19, 1870; Washington, D.C., U.S.
- Died: January 16, 1936 (aged 65); Sing Sing Prison, New York, U.S.
- Other names: Frank Howard; Thomas A. Sprague; Robert Hayden; John W. Pell
- Status: Executed by electrocution
- Motive: Sexual sadism; pedophilia; cannibalism
- Convictions: First degree murder Grand larceny
- Penalty: Death

Details
- Victims: 3+
- Span of crimes: 1924–1932
- Country: United States
- State: New York
- Date apprehended: December 13, 1934

Hamilton Howard "Albert" Fish (May 19, 1870 – January 16, 1936) was an American serial killer, rapist, child molester, and cannibal who committed at least three child murders between July 1924 and June 1928. He was also known as the Gray Man, the Werewolf of Wysteria, the Brooklyn Vampire, the Moon Maniac and the Boogey Man. Fish was a suspect in at least ten murders during his lifetime, although he confessed to only three that police were able to trace to a known homicide. He also confessed to stabbing at least two other people.

Fish once boasted that he "had children in every state", and at one time stated his number of victims was about 100. However, it is not known whether he was referring to rapes or cannibalization, nor is it known if the statement was truthful. Fish was apprehended on December 13, 1934, and put on trial for the kidnapping and murder of Grace Budd. He was convicted and executed by electric chair on January 16, 1936, at the age of 65.

== Early life ==
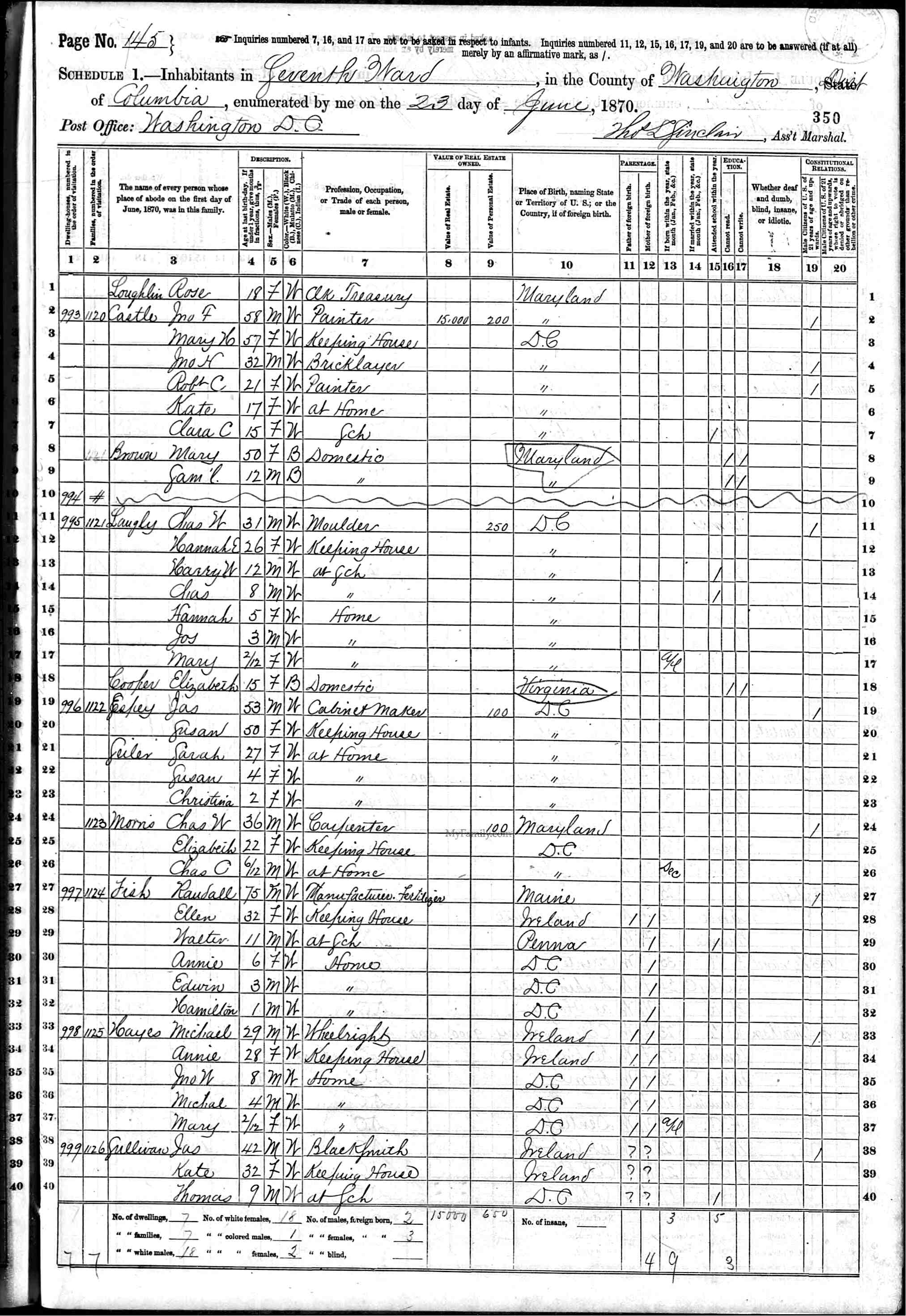
Fish in the 1870 United States census

A July 29, 1889, mug shot of 19-year-old Fish after an arrest for forgery

Albert Fish was born Hamilton Howard Fish in Washington, D.C., on May 19, 1870, to Randall Fish and Ellen Francis Howell. Fish's father was American, of English ancestry, and his mother was a Scots-Irish American. His father was forty-three years older than his mother and aged 75 at the time of his birth. Fish was his family's youngest child and had three living siblings: Walter, Annie and Edwin. He wished to be known as "Albert" after a dead sibling and to escape the nickname "Ham and Eggs" that he was given at an orphanage in which he spent much of his childhood.

Fish's family had a history of mental illness. His uncle had mania, one of his brothers was confined in a state mental hospital, a paternal half-brother suffered from schizophrenia and his sister was diagnosed with a "mental affliction". Three other relatives were diagnosed with mental illnesses, and his mother had "aural and/or visual hallucinations".

On October 16, 1875, Fish's father, a fertilizer manufacturer and former riverboat captain, suffered a fatal heart attack at the Baltimore and Potomac Railroad Station. His mother then put him into Saint John's Orphanage in Washington, where he was frequently physically abused. However, Fish began to enjoy the physical pain brought by the beatings. By 1880, Fish's mother secured a government job and was able to remove him from the orphanage.

In 1882, at age 12, Fish began a relationship with a telegraph boy. The youth introduced Fish to such practices as drinking urine and eating feces. Fish began visiting public baths where he could watch other boys undress, spending a great portion of his weekends on these visits. Throughout his life, he would write obscene letters to women whose names he acquired from classified advertising and matrimonial agencies.

== 1890–1918: Early adulthood and criminal history ==
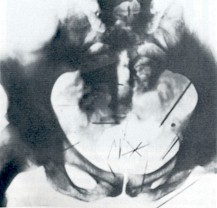
X-ray of Fish's pelvis and perineum, introduced as evidence at his trial, demonstrating more than two dozen self-embedded needles

By 1890, at age 20, Fish moved to New York City. There he engaged in male prostitution and began molesting and raping boys, mostly less than six years old. In 1898, his mother arranged a marriage for him with Anna Mary Hoffman, who was nine years his junior. They had six children: Albert, Anna, Gertrude, Eugene, John and Henry Fish. In 1903, Fish was arrested for embezzlement of funds, convicted and incarcerated in Sing Sing Prison.

Fish later recounted an incident in which a male lover took him to a wax museum, where he was fascinated by a bisection of a human penis and subsequently became obsessed with sexual mutilation. Several years later, around 1910, Fish was working in Wilmington, Delaware, when he met a 19-year-old man named Thomas Bedden. He took Bedden to where he was staying and the two began a sadomasochistic relationship; it is unclear whether the sadomasochism was consensual on Bedden's part, but Fish's later confession implied that he was intellectually disabled.

After ten days, Fish took Bedden to "an old farm house", where he tortured him over two weeks. Fish eventually tied Bedden up and cut off half of his penis. "I shall never forget his scream or the look he gave me", Fish later recalled. He originally intended to kill Bedden, cut up his body and take it home, but feared the hot weather and resulting smell would draw attention; instead, Fish poured peroxide over the wound, wrapped it in a Vaseline-covered handkerchief, left a $10 bill, kissed Bedden goodbye and left. "Took first train I could get back home. Never heard what become of him, or tried to find out," Fish recalled.

In January 1917, Fish's wife left him for John Straube, a handyman who boarded with the Fish family. Fish was subsequently forced to raise his children as a single parent. After his arrest, Fish told a newspaper that when his wife left him, she took nearly every possession the family owned.

Fish began to have auditory hallucinations; he once wrapped himself in a carpet, saying that he was following the instructions of John the Apostle. It was about this time that he began to indulge in self-harm by embedding needles into his groin and abdomen. After his arrest, X-rays revealed that Fish had at least twenty-nine needles lodged in his pelvic region. He also hit himself repeatedly with a nail-studded paddle, and inserted wool doused with lighter fluid into his anus and set it alight. While Fish was never thought to have physically attacked or abused his children, he did encourage them and their friends to paddle his buttocks with the same nail-studded paddle he used to abuse himself.

=== 1919–1930: Escalation ===
Around 1919, Fish stabbed an intellectually disabled boy in Georgetown. He often chose people who were either mentally disabled or African-American as his victims, later explaining that he assumed these people would not be missed when killed. Fish would later claim to have occasionally paid boys to procure other children for him. Fish tortured, mutilated, and murdered young children with his "implements of Hell": a meat cleaver, a butcher knife, and a small handsaw. On July 11, 1924, Fish found 8-year-old Beatrice Kiel playing alone on her parents' farm on Staten Island, New York. He offered her money to come and help him look for rhubarb. She was about to leave the farm when her mother chased Fish away. Fish left but returned later to the Kiels' barn, where he tried to sleep but was discovered by Beatrice's father and forced to leave. In 1924, the 54-year-old Fish, suffering from psychosis, felt that God was commanding him to torture and sexually mutilate children.

Shortly before he abducted Grace Budd, Fish attempted to test his "implements of Hell" on a 10-year-old child he had been molesting named Cyril Quinn. Quinn and his friend were playing box ball on a sidewalk when Fish asked them if they had eaten lunch. When they said that they had not, he invited them into his apartment for sandwiches. While the two boys were wrestling on Fish's bed, they dislodged his mattress; underneath was a knife, a small handsaw, and a meat cleaver. They became frightened and ran out of the apartment.

Despite already being married, Fish married Estella Wilcox on February 6, 1930, in Waterloo, New York; they divorced after only one week. Fish was arrested in May 1930 for "sending an obscene letter to a woman who answered an advertisement for a maid." Following that arrest and another in 1931, he was sent to the Bellevue Hospital for observation.

== Murder of Grace Budd ==
Budd pictured in 1928

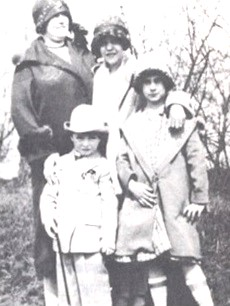
Budd (right) pictured with her mother and siblings

On May 25, 1928, Fish saw a classified advertisement in the Sunday edition of the New York World that read, "Young man, 18, wishes position in country. Edward Budd, 406 West 15th Street." On May 28, Fish, then 58 years old, visited the Budd family in Manhattan under the pretence of hiring Edward; he later confessed that he planned to tie Edward up, mutilate him, and leave him to bleed to death. Fish introduced himself as "Frank Howard", a farmer from Farmingdale, New York. He promised to hire Budd and his friend and said he would send for them in a few days. Fish failed to show up, but he sent a telegram to the Budd family apologizing and set a later date. When Fish returned, he met Edward's younger sister, 10-year-old Grace "Gracie" Budd. He apparently shifted his intentions toward Grace and quickly made up a story about having to attend his niece's birthday party.

He persuaded the parents, Delia Bridget Flanagan and Albert Francis Budd Sr., to let Grace accompany him to the party that evening. Fish subsequently took Grace to an abandoned house he had previously picked out to use for the murder of his next victim, Wisteria Cottage at 359 Mountain Road, (Note: Not #379 as reported in the news.com.au article. There is no house at #379, and the house pictured in the article is #359.) located in the East Irvington neighborhood of Irvington, New York. There, Fish manually strangled her to death, then decapitated and dismembered her body, and ate most of the remains over the next several days. The police arrested 66-year-old superintendent Charles Edward Pope on September 5, 1930, as a suspect in Grace's disappearance, accused by Pope's estranged wife. Pope spent 108 days in jail between his arrest and trial on December 22, 1930. He was found not guilty.

=== Letter to the mother of Grace Budd ===
In November 1934, an anonymous letter sent to Grace's parents ultimately led the police to Fish. Budd's mother was illiterate and could not read the letter herself, so she had her son read it to her. The unaltered letter reads:

My dear Mrs. Budd,

In 1894 a friend of mine shipped as a deck hand on the Steamer Tacoma, Capt. John Davis. They sailed from San Francisco for Hong Kong China. On arriving there he and two others went ashore and got drunk. When they returned the boat was gone.

At that time there was famine in China. Meat of any kind was from $1 to 3 Dollars a pound. So great was the suffering among the very poor that all children under 12 were sold for food in order to keep others from starving. A boy or girl under 14 was not safe in the street. You could go in any shop and ask for steak—chops—or stew meat. Part of the naked body of a boy or girl would be brought out and just what you wanted cut from it. A boy or girls behind which is the sweetest part of the body and sold as veal cutlet brought the highest price.

John staid [sic] there so long he acquired a taste for human flesh. On his return to N.Y. he stole two boys one 7 one 11. Took them to his home stripped them naked tied them in a closet. Then burned everything they had on. Several times every day and night he spanked them—tortured them—to make their meat good and tender.

First he killed the 11 year old boy, because he had the fattest ass and of course the most meat on it. Every part of his body was Cooked and eaten except the head—bones and guts. He was Roasted in the oven (all of his ass), boiled, broiled, fried and stewed. The little boy was next, went the same way. At that time, I was living at 409 E 100 st., near—right side. He told me so often how good Human flesh was I made up my mind to taste it.

On Sunday June the 3—1928 I called on you at 406 W 15 St. Brought you pot cheese—strawberries. We had lunch. Grace sat in my lap and kissed me. I made up my mind to eat her.

On the pretense of taking her to a party. You said Yes she could go. I took her to an empty house in Westchester I had already picked out. When we got there, I told her to remain outside. She picked wildflowers. I went upstairs and stripped all my clothes off. I knew if I did not I would get her blood on them.

When all was ready I went to the window and called her. Then I hid in a closet until she was in the room. When she saw me all naked she began to cry and tried to run down the stairs. I grabbed her and she said she would tell her mamma.

First I stripped her naked. How she did kick—bite and scratch. I choked her to death, then cut her in small pieces so I could take my meat to my rooms. Cook and eat it. How sweet and tender her little ass was roasted in the oven. It took me 9 days to eat her entire body. I did not fuck her tho I could of had I wished. She died a virgin.

Police investigated the letter and although the story concerning "Capt. Davis" and the famine in Hong Kong could not be verified, the part of the letter concerning the murder of Grace was found to be accurate in its description of the kidnapping and subsequent events, though it was impossible to confirm whether Fish had actually eaten parts of Grace's body.

== Capture ==
The letter was delivered in an envelope that had a small hexagonal emblem with the letters "N.Y.P.C.B.A." representing "New York Private Chauffeur's Benevolent Association". A chauffeur at the company told the police he had taken some of the stationery home but left it at his rooming house at 200 East 52nd Street when he moved out. The landlady of the rooming house said that Fish checked out of that room a few days earlier. She said that Fish's son sent him money and he asked her to hold his next check for him. Detective William King, the chief investigator for the case, waited outside the room until Fish returned. He agreed to go to headquarters for questioning, then brandished a razor blade. King disarmed Fish and took him to police headquarters. Fish made no attempt to deny the murder of Grace Budd, saying that he meant to go to the house to kill her brother Edward. (Note: Fish supplied the following biographical information in captivity: "I was born May 19, 1870, in Washington, D.C. We lived on B Street, N.E., between Second and Third. My father was Captain Randall Fish, 32nd-degree Mason, and he is buried in the Grand Lodge grounds of the Congressional Cemetery. He was a Potomac River boat captain, running from D.C. to Marshall Hall, Virginia [sic]. My father dropped dead October 15, 1875, in the old Pennsylvania Station where President Garfield was shot, and I was placed in St. John's Orphanage in Washington. I was there till I was nearly nine, and that's where I got started wrong. We were unmercifully whipped. I saw boys doing many things they should not have done. I sang in the choir from 1880 to 1884, soprano, at St. John's. I came to New York. I was a good painter, interiors or anything. I got an apartment and brought my mother up from Washington. We lived at 76 West 101st Street, and that's where I met my wife. After our six children were born, she left me. She took all the furniture and didn't even leave a mattress for the children to sleep on. I'm still worried about my children, you'd think they'd come to visit their old dad in jail, but they haven't.")

Following his confession, Fish led officers to the site of the abandoned house and showed them where Grace's remains could be found. Fish said it "never even entered [his] head" to rape the girl, but later told his attorney that, while kneeling on Grace's chest and strangling her, he did have two involuntary ejaculations. This information was used at trial to make the claim the kidnapping was sexually motivated, thus avoiding any mention of cannibalism.

== Additional crimes discovered after Fish's arrest ==
=== Francis McDonnell ===
During the night of July 14, 1924, 9-year-old Francis McDonnell was reported missing after he failed to return home after playing catch with friends in Port Richmond, Staten Island. A search was organized, and his body was found—hanging from a tree—in a wooded area near his home. McDonnell was the son of a police officer. In the immediate aftermath of the discovery, District Attorney Albert C. Fach of Richmond County detained Jacob Gottlieb, an 18-year-old employee of Seaview Hospital in Newdorp, as a material witness. Gottlieb admitted that he and another hospital employee had frequented the woods where the boy was killed — an area the group called the "Rattlesnake Nest", leading Fach to order the arrest of the second employee on suspicion of murder. Neither man was ultimately charged.

The boy had been sexually assaulted and then strangled with his suspenders. According to an autopsy, he had also suffered extensive lacerations to his legs and abdomen, and his left hamstring had almost entirely been stripped of its flesh. Fish refused to claim responsibility for this, although he later stated that he intended to castrate the boy but fled when he heard someone approaching the area. The boy's friends told the police that he was taken by an elderly man with a grey moustache. A neighbour also told the police he observed the boy with a similar-looking man walking along a grassy path into the nearby woods.

Francis' mother, Anna McDonnell, said she saw the same man earlier that day, telling reporters, "He came shuffling down the street mumbling to himself and making queer motions with his hands ... I saw his thick grey hair and his drooping grey moustache. Everything about him seemed faded and grey." This description resulted in the mysterious stranger becoming known as "The Grey Man". The McDonnell murder remained unsolved until the murder of Budd. When several eyewitnesses, among them the Staten Island farmer Hans Kiel, positively identified Fish as the odd stranger seen around Port Richmond on the day of McDonnell's disappearance, Richmond County District Attorney Thomas Walsh announced his intention to seek an indictment against Fish for the boy's murder. At first, Fish denied the charges. It was only in March 1935, after the conclusion of his trial for the Budd murder and his confession to the killing of Billy Gaffney, that he confirmed to investigators that he had also raped and murdered McDonnell. When the McDonnell confession was made public, the New York Daily Mirror wrote that the disclosure solidified Fish's reputation as "the most vicious child-slayer in criminal history".

=== Billy Gaffney ===
On February 11, 1927, 3-year-old Billy Beaton and his 12-year-old brother were playing in the apartment hallway in Brooklyn with 4-year-old William "Billy" Gaffney. When the 12-year-old left for his apartment, both younger boys disappeared; Beaton was found later on the roof of the apartments. Gaffney's disappearance prompted a citywide search across New York. He was described as four years old, 40 pounds, with blue eyes, light complexion, and dark reddish-brown hair; when last seen he wore a gray blouse, brown knickers, black shoes and stockings, and had no hat or coat. When asked what happened to Gaffney, Beaton said "the bogeyman took him." Gaffney's body was never recovered. Initially, serial killer Peter Kudzinowski was a suspect in Gaffney's murder. Then, Joseph Meehan, a motorman on a Brooklyn trolley, saw a picture of Fish in a newspaper and identified him as the old man whom he saw February 11, 1927; the man had been trying to quiet a little boy sitting with him on the trolley. The boy was not wearing a jacket, was crying for his mother, and was dragged by the man on and off the trolley. Beaton's description of the "bogeyman" matched Fish. Police matched the description of the child to Gaffney.

Detectives of the Manhattan Missing Persons Bureau were able to establish that Fish was employed as a house painter by a Brooklyn real estate company during February 1927, and that on the day of Gaffney's disappearance, he was working at a location a few miles from where the boy was abducted. Gaffney's mother, Elizabeth Gaffney, visited Fish in Sing Sing, accompanied by Detective King. She wanted to ask him about her son's death, but Fish refused to speak to her. However, Fish claimed the following in a letter to his attorney:

I brought him to the Riker Ave. dumps. There is a house that stands alone, not far from where I took him ... I took the G boy there. Stripped him naked and tied his hands and feet and gagged him with a piece of dirty rag I picked out of the dump. Then I burned his clothes. Threw his shoes in the dump. Then I walked back and took trolley to 59 St. at 2 A.M. and walked home from there. Next day about 2 P.M., I took tools, a good heavy cat-of-nine tails. Home made. Short handle. Cut one of my belts in half, slit these half in six strips about 8 in. long. I whipped his bare behind till the blood ran from his legs. I cut off his ears – nose – slit his mouth from ear to ear. Gouged out his eyes. He was dead then. I stuck the knife in his belly and held my mouth to his body and drank his blood. I picked up four old potato sacks and gathered a pile of stones. Then I cut him up. I had a grip with me. I put his nose, ears and a few slices of his belly in the grip. Then I cut him thru the middle of his body. Just below his belly button. Then thru his legs about 2 in. below his behind. I put this in my grip with a lot of paper. I cut off the head – feet – arms – hands and the legs below the knee. This I put in sacks weighed with stones, tied the ends and threw them into the pools of slimy water you will see all along the road going to North Beach. Water is 3 to 4 ft. deep. They sank at once. I came home with my meat. I had the front of his body I liked best. His monkey and pee wees and a nice little fat behind to roast in the oven and eat. I made a stew out of his ears – nose – pieces of his face and belly. I put onions, carrots, turnips, celery, salt and pepper. It was good. Then I split the cheeks of his behind open, cut off his monkey and pee wees and washed them first. I put strips of bacon on each cheek of his behind and put in the oven. Then I picked 4 onions and when meat had roasted about 1/4 hr., I poured about a pint of water over it for gravy and put in the onions. At frequent intervals I basted his behind with a wooden spoon. So the meat would be nice and juicy. In about 2 hr., it was nice and brown, cooked thru. I never ate any roast turkey that tasted half as good as his sweet fat little behind did. I ate every bit of the meat in about four days. His little monkey was as sweet as a nut, but his pee-wees I could not chew. Threw them in the toilet.

== Trial and execution ==
Fish's trial for the murder of Grace Budd began on March 11, 1935, in White Plains, New York. Frederick P. Close presided as judge, and Westchester County Chief Assistant District Attorney Elbert F. Gallagher was prosecuting attorney. Fish's defense counsel was James Dempsey, a former prosecutor and the one-time mayor of Peekskill, New York. The trial lasted for ten days. Fish pleaded insanity, and claimed to have heard voices from God telling him to kill children. Several psychiatrists testified about Fish's sexual fetishes, which included sadism and masochism, flagellation, exhibitionism, voyeurism, piquerism, cannibalism, coprophagia, urophilia, hematolagnia, pedophilia, necrophilia, and infibulation. Dempsey, in his summation, noted that Fish was a "psychiatric phenomenon" and that nowhere in legal or medical records was there another individual who possessed so many sexual abnormalities.

The defense's chief expert witness was Fredric Wertham, a psychiatrist with an emphasis on child development who conducted psychiatric examinations for the New York criminal courts. During two days of testimony, Wertham explained Fish's obsession with religion and specifically his preoccupation with the biblical story of Abraham and Isaac (Genesis 22:1–24). Wertham said that Fish believed that similarly "sacrificing" a boy would be penance for his own sins and that even if the act itself was wrong, angels would prevent it if God did not approve. Fish attempted the sacrifice once before but was thwarted when a car drove past. Edward Budd was the next intended victim, but he turned out to be larger than expected so he settled on Grace. Although he knew Grace was female, it is believed that Fish perceived her as a boy. Wertham then detailed Fish's cannibalism, which in his mind he associated with communion. The last question Dempsey asked Wertham was 15,000 words long, detailed Fish's life and ended with asking how the doctor considered his mental condition based on this life. Wertham simply answered "He is insane."

Gallagher cross-examined Wertham on whether Fish knew the difference between right and wrong. He responded that he did know but that it was a perverted knowledge based on his opinions of sin, atonement, and religion and thus was an "insane knowledge". The defense called two more psychiatrists to support Wertham's findings. The first of four rebuttal witnesses was Menas Gregory, the former manager of the Bellevue Hospital, where Fish was treated during 1930. He testified that Fish was abnormal but sane. Under cross-examination, Dempsey asked if coprophilia, urophilia, and pedophilia indicated a sane or insane person. Gregory replied that such a person was not "mentally sick" and that these were common perversions that were "socially perfectly alright" and that Fish was "no different from millions of other people", some very prominent and successful, who had the "very same" perversions.

The next witness was the resident physician at The Tombs, Perry Lichtenstein. Dempsey objected to a doctor with no training in psychiatry testifying on the issue of sanity, but Justice Close overruled on the basis that the jury could decide what weight to give a prison doctor. When asked whether Fish's causing himself pain indicated a mental condition, Lichtenstein replied, "That is not masochism", as he was only "punishing himself to get sexual gratification". The next witness, Charles Lambert, testified that coprophilia was a common practice and that religious cannibalism may be psychopathic but "was a matter of taste" and not evidence of a psychosis. The last witness, James Vavasour, repeated Lambert's opinion. Another defense witness was Mary Nicholas, Fish's 17-year-old stepdaughter. She described how Fish taught her and her brothers and sisters several games involving overtones of masochism and child molestation.

None of the jurors doubted that Fish was insane, but ultimately, as one later explained, they felt he should be executed anyway. They found him to be sane and guilty, and the judge sentenced the defendant to death by electrocution. Fish arrived at prison in March 1935, and was executed on January 16, 1936, in the electric chair at Sing Sing. He entered the chamber at 11:06 p.m. and was pronounced dead three minutes later. He was buried in the Sing Sing Prison Cemetery. Fish is said to have helped the executioner position the electrodes on his body. His last words were reportedly, "I don't even know why I'm here." According to one witness present, it took two jolts before Fish died, creating the rumor that the apparatus was short-circuited by the needles that Fish had inserted into his body. These rumors were later regarded as untrue, as Fish reportedly died in the same fashion and time frame as others in the electric chair.

At a meeting with reporters after the execution, Fish's lawyer James Dempsey revealed that he was in possession of his client's "final statement". This amounted to several pages of hand-written notes that Fish apparently penned in the hours just prior to his death. When pressed by the assembled journalists to reveal the document's contents, Dempsey refused, stating, "I will never show it to anyone. It was the most filthy string of obscenities that I have ever read."

== Victims ==
=== Known ===
Between 1924 and 1928, Fish killed at least three children:

- Francis McDonnell, age 8, July 15, 1924, Long Island, New York.
- Billy Gaffney, age 4, February 11, 1927, New York City.
- Grace Budd, age 10, June 3, 1928, New York City.

=== Suspected ===
Though Fish denied involvement with any other murders, he was a suspect in several other ones.

- Yetta Abramowitz, 12, was strangled and beaten on the roof of a five-story apartment house at 1013 Simpson Street in the Bronx on May 14, 1927. She died in a hospital shortly after she was found. An unidentified man matching Fish's physical description was sighted trying to lure several local young girls into dark hallways and alleys on the date of Abramowitz's death.
- The mutilated body of 16-year-old Mary Ellen O'Connor was found in the woods close to a house that Fish had been painting in Far Rockaway, Queens on February 15, 1932.

=== Possible ===
Fish claimed to have sexually assaulted at least 100 boys, most of whom were African-American or had developmental disabilities. He claimed he picked them because he believed the police would not fully investigate attacks against them.

- Emma Richardson, 5, October 3, 1926.
- Benjamin Collings, 17, December 15, 1932.

== See also ==
- Child cannibalism
- List of incidents of cannibalism
- List of people executed in New York
- List of serial killers in the United States
- Lonely hearts killer
