= DDX =

DDX may refer to:

- ${\mathrm{d} \over \mathrm{d}x}$, a common notation for the differential operator with respect to a variable x
- DD(X), former program name of a class of U.S. Navy destroyers, that became the Zumwalt-class
- Differential diagnosis (DDx or D/Dx), a systematic method used to identify unknowns
- Device Dependent X, graphics device drivers supporting 2D acceleration in the X.Org Server
- DDX (chemistry), a collective name for DDT and its breakdown products DDE and DDD

== See also ==
- 3DDX, a rhythm video game
- DD10 (disambiguation)
- D2X (disambiguation)
- DX (disambiguation)
- DXX (disambiguation)
- DXD (disambiguation)
