= DD10 =

DD10 may refer to:

== Transportation and vehicles ==
- USS Paul Jones (DD-10), a Bainbridge-class destroyer of the U.S. Navy
- ROCS Po Yang (DD-10), a Sumner-class destroyer of the Republic of China's Taiwanese navy
- Donnet-Denhaut DD-10, a French WW1 anti-submarine flying boat airplane

== Other uses ==
- Montrose (DD10), Angus, Dundee, Scotland, UK; see DD postcode area
- DD 10, a TV channel in India broadcast by DD Sahyadri

== See also ==
- DDX (disambiguation)
- D10 (disambiguation)
- DD (disambiguation)
