= 10D =

10D or 10d may refer to:

- Canon EOS 10D, a digital SLR camera
- Nebraska Link 10D, a part of the Nebraska highway system
- A ten-penny nail

== See also ==
- D10 (disambiguation)
