= Gawk =

Gawk or gawking may refer to:

- gawk (GNU package), the GNU implementation of the AWK programming language
- Rubbernecking, openly staring at someone or something, look steadily, gaze.
- Gawk or gock, a type of rimshot in percussion
- Gawk, a 2015 album by Vundabar
