= Nikon Speedlight =

Brand name used by Nikon Corporation for their photographic flash units

Speedlight is the brand name used by Nikon Corporation for their photographic flash units, used since the company's introduction of strobe flashes in the 1960s. Nikon's standalone Speedlights (those not built into the company's cameras) have the SB- prefix as part of their model designation. Current Speedlights and other Nikon accessories make up part of Nikon's Creative Lighting System (CLS), which includes the Advanced Wireless Lighting, that enables various Nikon cameras to control multiple Nikon flash units in up to three separate controlled groups by sending encoded pre-flash signals to slave units.

Nikon's competitors like Canon and Ricoh use the similar name Speedlite for their flashes. Both names indicate that strobe flashes produce much shorter and more intense bursts of light than earlier photographic lighting systems, such as flashbulbs, or continuous lamps used in some studio situations.

== Models ==
Nikon's Speedlight units are: (Update January 5, 2016)

Early units (all discontinued)

- SB-1
- SB-2 (c. 1970)
- SB-3 (c. 1970)
- SB-4 (c. 1971)
- SB-6 (c. 1965)
- SB-7 (c. 1974)
- SB-8E (c. 1975)
- SB-9 (c. 1978)
- SB-10 (c. 1978)
- SB-E (c. 1979)
- SB-11 (c. 1980)
- SB-12
- SB-14
- SB-15
- SB-16

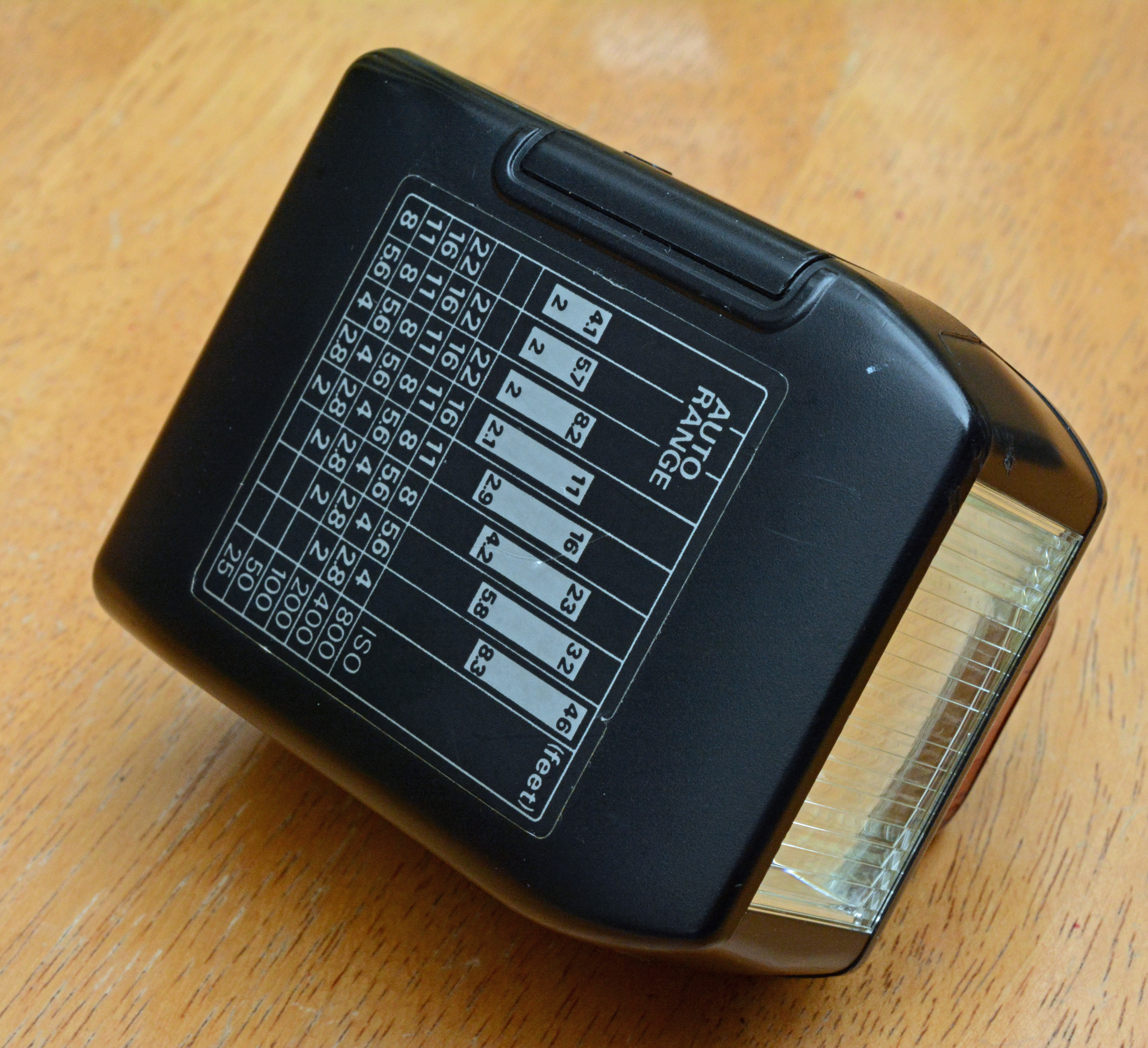
Nikon SB-23 Speedlight flash unit, with distance scale for ISO & f/stop combinations

- SB-17 (c. 1983)
- SB-20
- SB-22
- SB-22s
- SB-23
- SB-24
- SB-25
- SB-26
- SB-27
- SB-28
- SB-29
- SB-30

D-TTL Units (all discontinued)

- SB-28DX
- SB-50DX
- SB-80DX

I-TTL Units

- SB-300 (2013)
- SB-400 (2006-2012) (discontinued)
- SB-500 (2014-2023) (discontinued)
- SB-600 (28 January 2004) (discontinued)
- SB-700 (15 September 2010)
- SB-800 (22 July 2003) (discontinued)
- SB-900 (01 July 2008) (discontinued)
- SB-910 (30 November 2011) (discontinued)
- SB-R200
- SB-5000 (2016)(First Model with Radio Transmission)

Models only for the Nikon 1 series cameras (all discontinued)

- SB-N5 (2011)
- SB-N7 (2013)
- SB-N10 (2014)

=== Models compatible with the latest I-TTL System ===
Current models (guide numbers - ISO 100, 35FF):

==== SB-300 and SB-N7 ====
(GN 59 ft, 18 m @ 27 mm)

The SB-300 is Nikon's latest smaller shoe mount flash unit which replaces SB-400. It is less powerful than SB-400 and uses AAA-size batteries. SB-300 is derived from the SB-N7, the same flash unit previously released for the Nikon 1 "multi-accessory port," instead of the ISO 518:2006 hot shoe. Both SB-300 and SB-N7 have a variable angle 'bounce' head up to 120 degrees but has no horizontal swiveling.

==== SB-400 (discontinued) ====
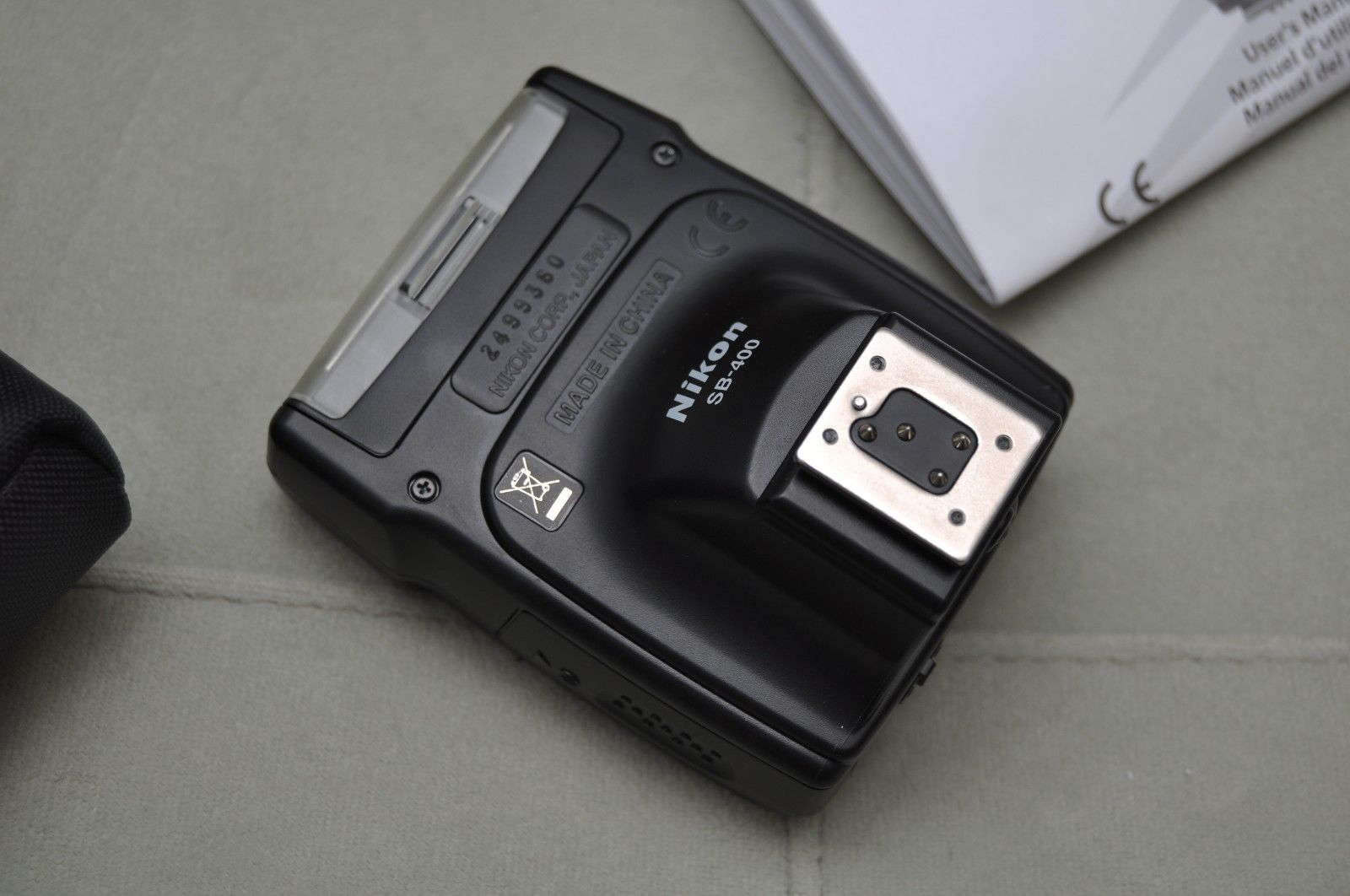
Nikon SB-400 Flash

(GN 69 ft, 21 m @ 27 mm)

The SB-400 is a lightweight and very compact shoe-mount flash unit, powered by two AA-size batteries. It uses a 40 mm xenon tube. Despite its small size, SB-400 is a very capable flash with a variable angle 'bounce' head (up to 90 deg.). The head lacks tilt movement which is common to larger flashes. SB-400 cannot be used in slave or master mode in Nikon's CLS system. It weighs 127 g (without batteries) and is mostly made in China.

==== SB-500 (discontinued) ====
(GN of 24 m at ISO 100)

The Nikon SB-500 is a lightweight and very compact shoe-mount flash unit with coverage for a 24 mm lens on an FX camera or a 16 mm lens on DX camera and combined with 100 lux LED for video light, powered by two AA-size batteries. SB-500 is a very capable flash with a variable angle 'bounce' head (up to 90°) and rotates 180° for soft lighting effects. The flash is part of Nikon's Creative Lighting System (CLS) with two-group/two-channel control and features the intelligent-TTL (i-TTL) exposure mode.

==== SB-600 (discontinued) ====
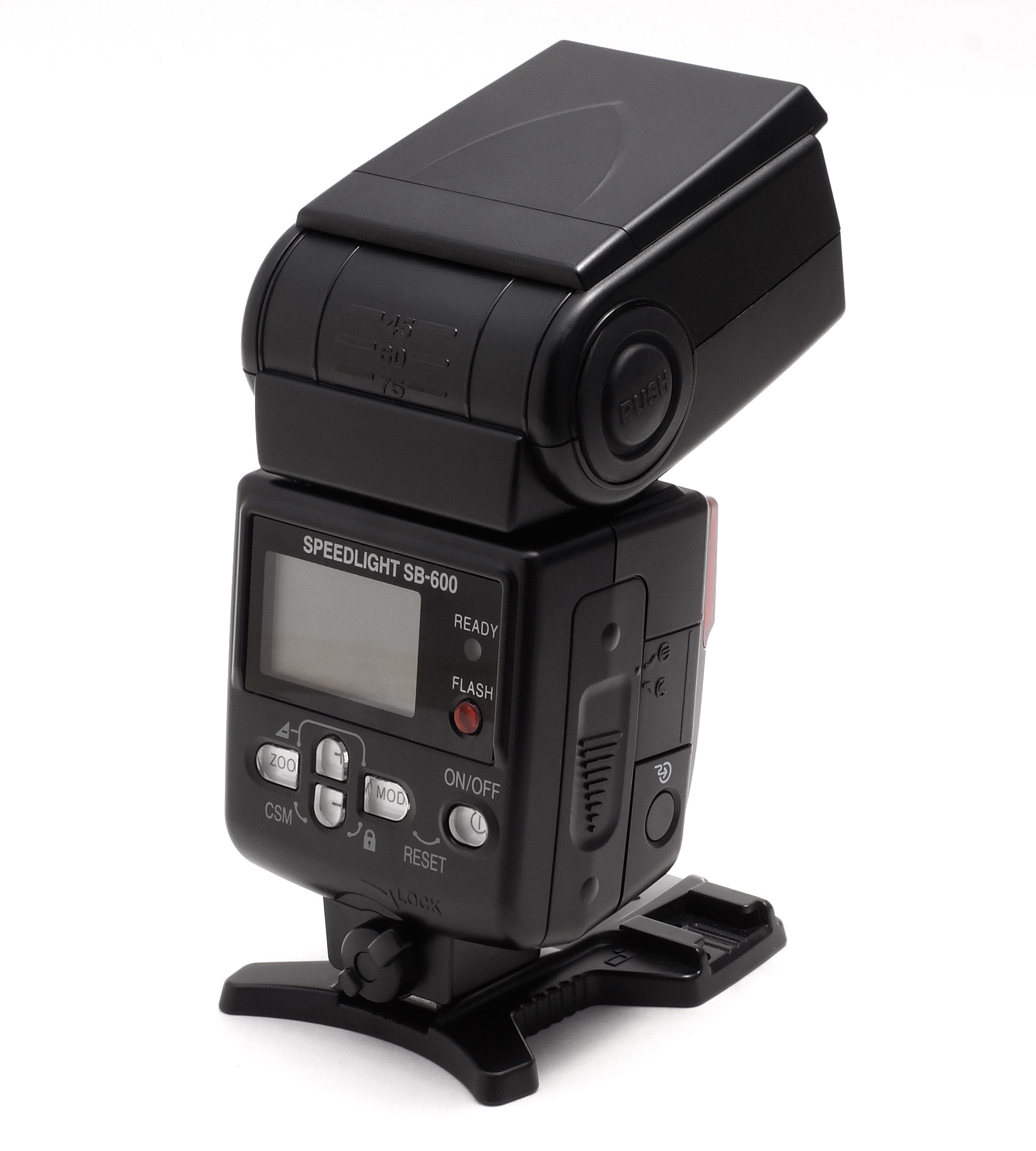
Back

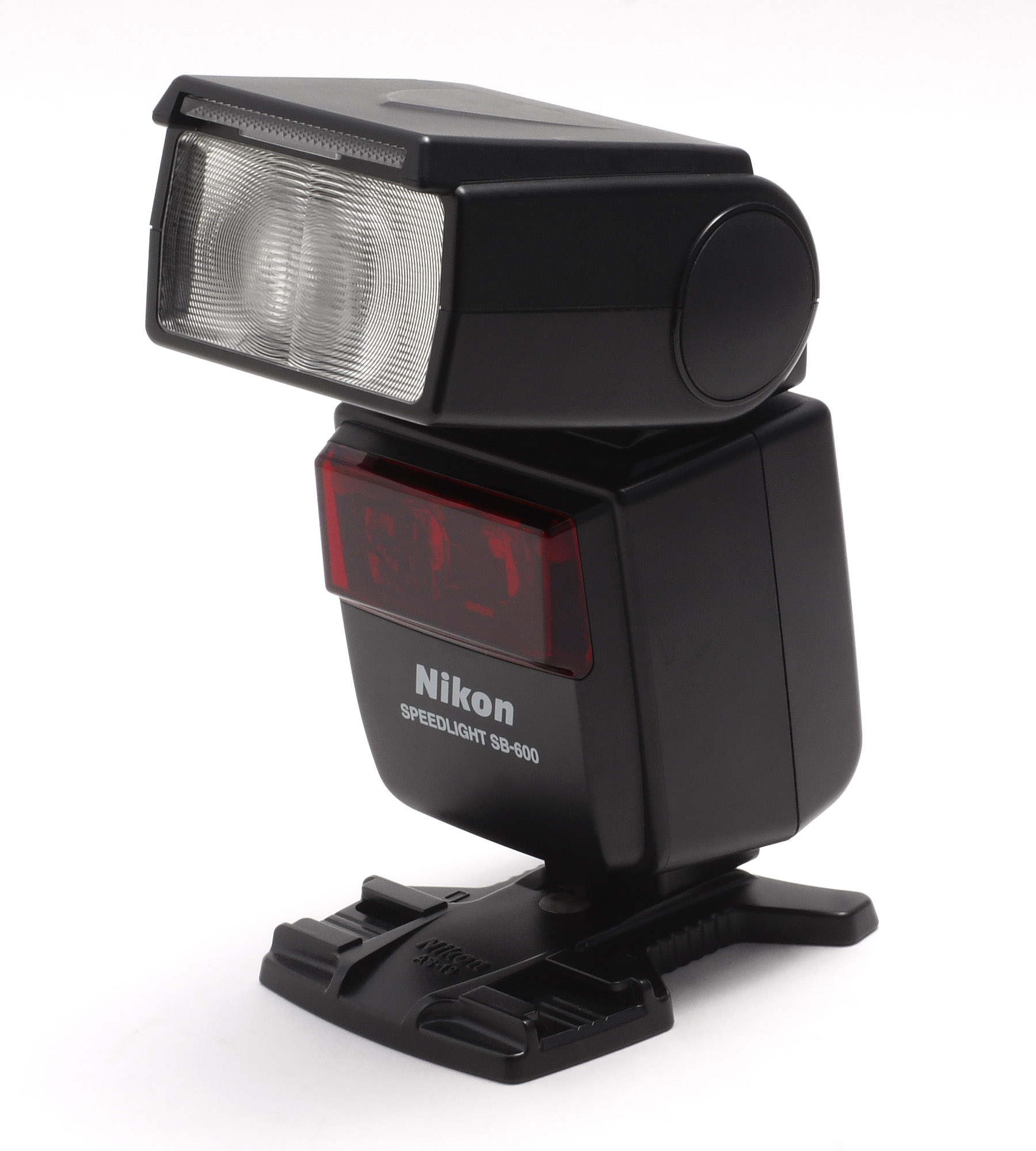
Front

Nikon Speedlight SB-600

(GN 98 ft, 30 m @ 35 mm)

The Nikon SB-600 is a flash made by Nikon for their digital and film single-lens reflex cameras. The SB-600 can mount to any Nikon camera with a four-prong hotshoe. The SB-600 cannot control other flashes through a wireless connection; however, a flash commander (e.g. another flash unit such as an SB-800, a commander controller like the SU-800, or the pop-up flash on a certain D-SLR models including the D700, D300, D300S, D7000, and D90) can control it wirelessly. The SB-600 is part of Nikon's Creative Lighting System (CLS) and features the intelligent-TTL (i-TTL) exposure mode. This model is the most compatible unit with older model film and earlier digital cameras like Nikon, F5, F6, and D100 as well as all recent cameras.

It is a mid-range model, weighing approximately 300 g without 4 AA batteries.

==== SB-700 ====
(GN 92 ft, 29 m @ 35 mm)

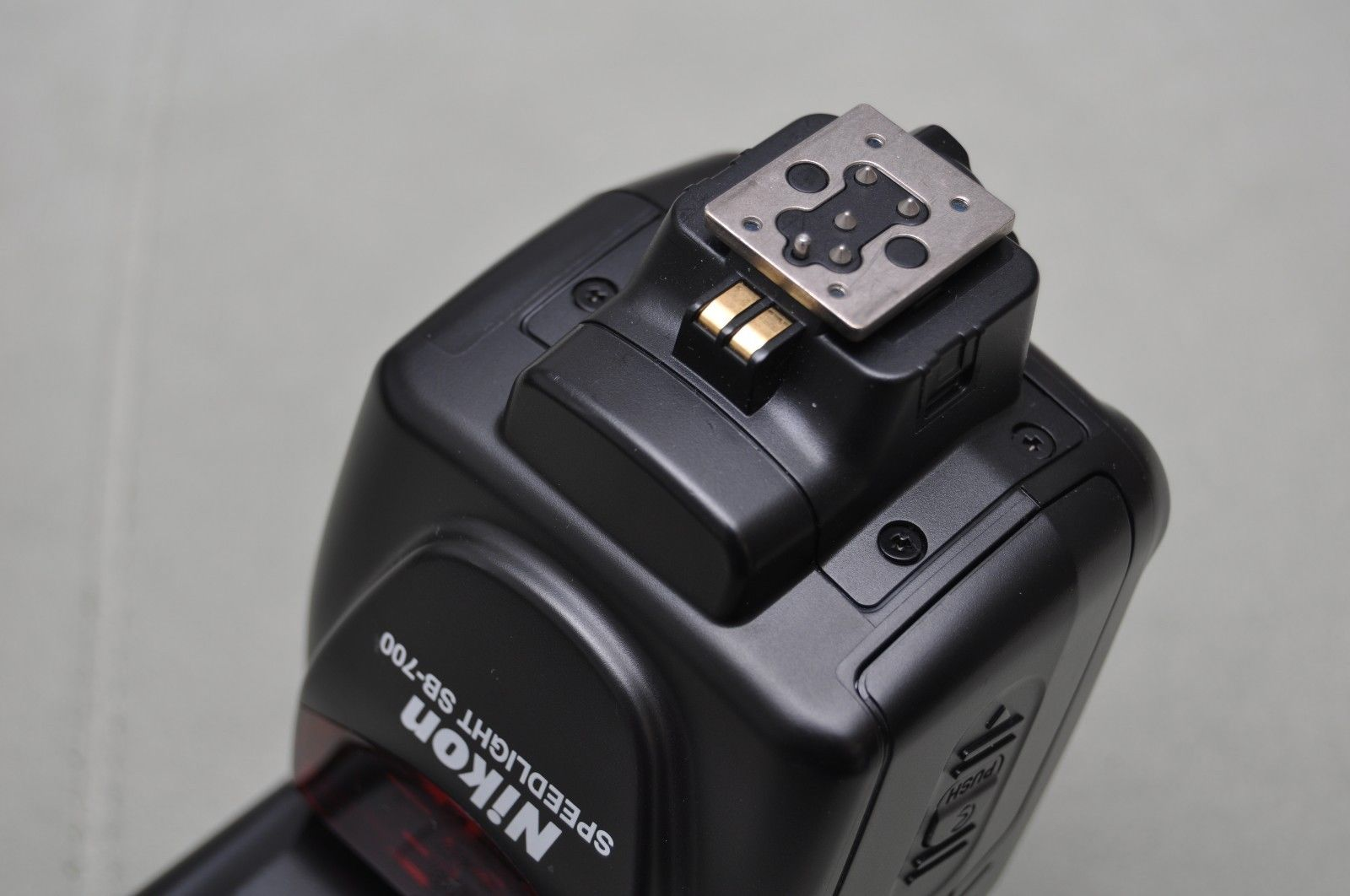
Nikon Speedlight SB-700 Flash shoe contacts

SB-700 is an upgrade to the older SB-600 with refined design in both electronics and mechanics. It is a more reliable and durable flash in many ways than the SB-600 except the weakly made plastic foot section. Professionals consider the unit as more like a compact version of SB-9XX line supporting both master and slave functions. It features a newly designed interior zoom head and locking shoe section which is identical to SB-900 and SB-910 models. SB-700 shares similar features and menu system of SB-900 and SB-910 as well. The SB-700 is part of Nikon's Creative Lighting System (CLS) and features the intelligent-TTL (i-TTL) exposure mode. It weighs approximately 360 g without 4 AA batteries. It is mostly made in China. Announced September 2010 and available since October 2010.

==== SB-800 (discontinued) ====
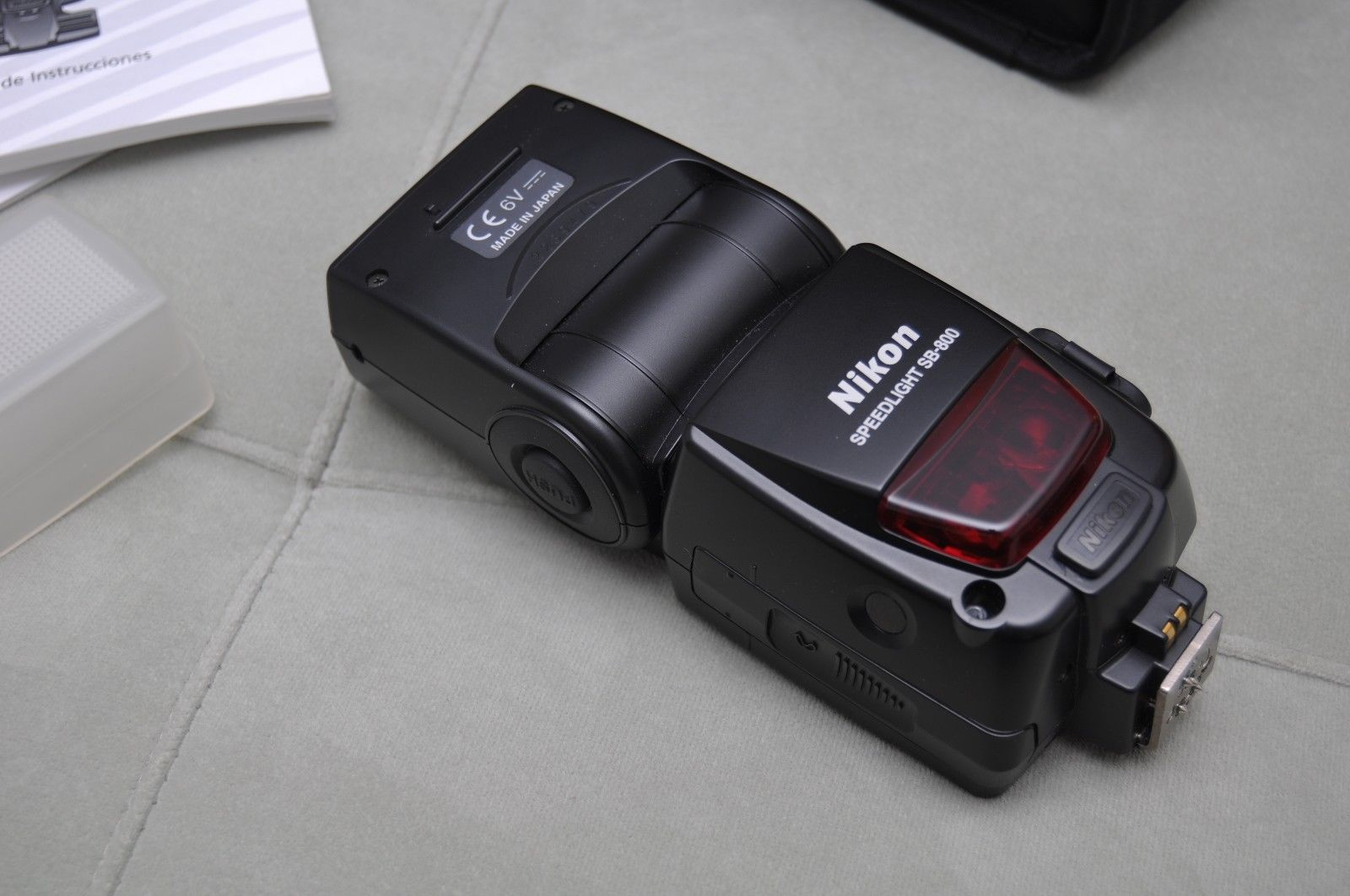
Nikon SB-800 Flash

(GN 125 ft, 38 m @ 35 mm)

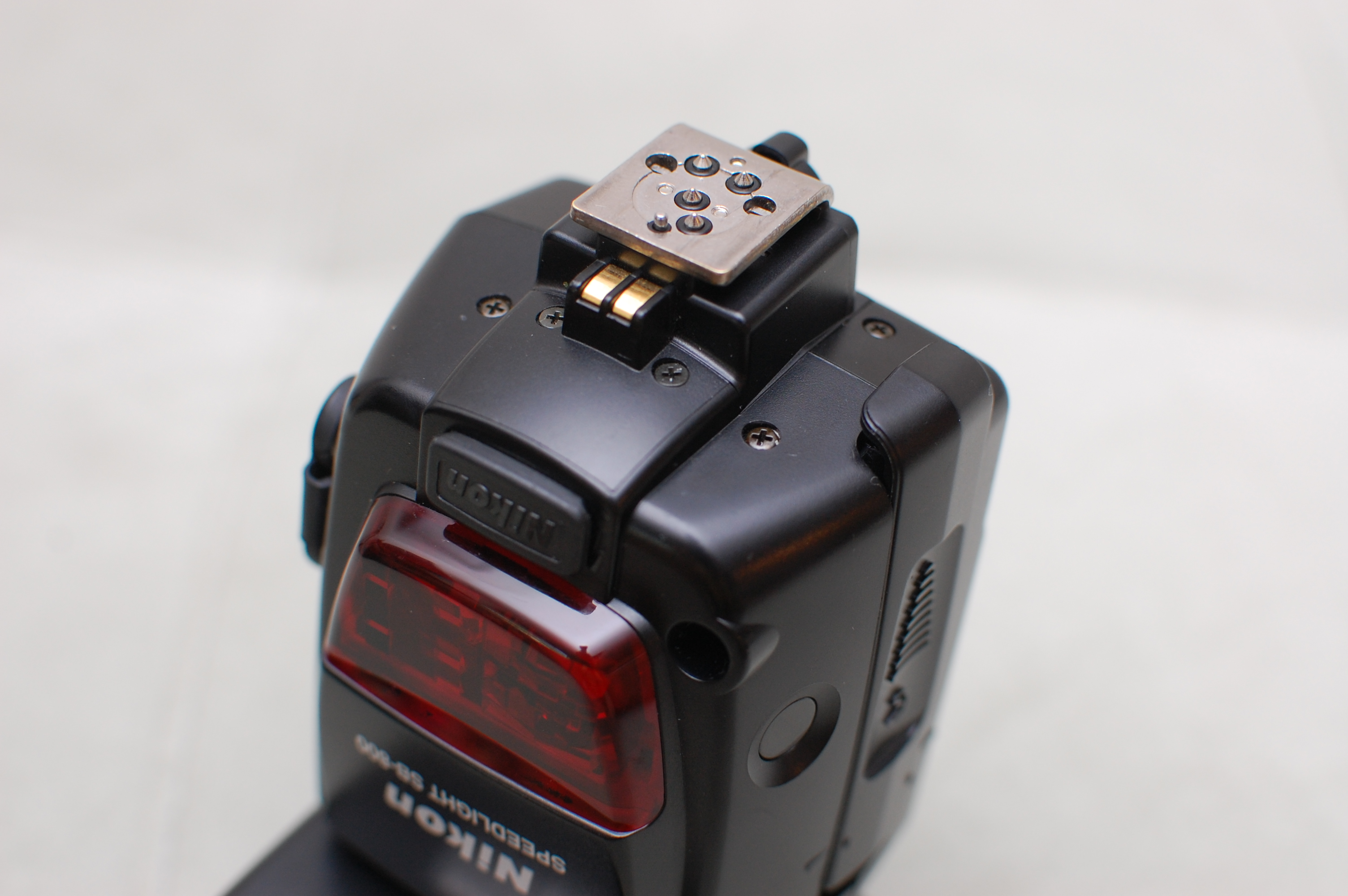
Shoe Contacts shown on a Nikon SB-800

SB-800 is a very high quality professional model which weighs approximately 350 g without 4 or 5 AA batteries (optional fifth battery for quicker recycling) The Nikon SB-800 is a flash made by Nikon based on the earlier SB-80DX model for their digital and film single-lens reflex cameras. It has electronic interfaces for through-the-lens (TTL) automatic exposure and automatic zoom to match lens focal lengths from 24 to 105 mm (35 mm equivalent), plus 14 and 17 mm with the use of the built-in diffuser or 14 mm with the external Nikon Diffusion Dome, as well as film speed in the range from ISO 3 to 8000 (25 through 1000 in TTL mode with film cameras). Its guide number is 38 meters / 125 feet at ISO 100 and 35 mm, with a maximum range of 58 m when adjusted at 105 mm.

The SB-800 is part of Nikon's Creative Lighting System (CLS) and features the intelligent-TTL (i-TTL) exposure mode. It is compatible with all SLR cameras (such as the D2H, D2X, D3, D40, D50, D60, D70, D80, D90, D200, D300/s and F6), it can be used as master commander as well as remote flash unit within a CLS wireless lighting setup. It is one of the high-end units for Nikon which features metal joints and supports inside the body. It is sturdier than newer models like SB-700, SB-900, and SB-910 which are prone to impact breakage due to non-reinforced plastic shoe mount bases. All SB-800 units are made in Japan.

By many professionals, it is considered the most advanced flash unit when compared to its compact size. The Speedlights.net says that "for many professional photographers this flash is still the best hot shoe strobe out there today" with smaller size than the successor SB 900, but has bigger Guide Number 38 over 34.

It features the following unlike the newer units:

- Single piece metal foot (borrowed from SB-80DX)
- Compact body design
- 5th battery attachment option
- High GN power (the same as SB-80DX)
- Dedicated modeling light button

==== SB-900 and SB-910 (discontinued) ====
(GN 111 ft, 34 m @ 35 mm)

SB-900 is a larger professional model released 30 June 2008, weighs approximately 415 g. It is a flash made by Nikon for their digital and film single-lens reflex cameras, released on June 30, 2008. It has electronic interfaces for through-the-lens (TTL) automatic exposure and automatic zoom to match lens focal lengths from 17 to 200 mm (35 mm equivalent) and 12 to 200 mm in Nikon DX Format. Over SB-800, SB-900 features:

- Larger dot matrix LCD screen
- Silent charging with upgraded thin transformer and micro-controller ICs
- Dedicated power and master/slave selector button
- Jog dial menu navigation
- Newly designed and tighter shoe lock mechanism
- Larger Flash head with more sensors for various attachments
- Newly designed inner zoom head unit with larger distance
- Three element front AF focus assist LEDs
- Newly designed battery door (with push button lock addition on SB-910 similar to SB-700)

The SB-900 is part of Nikon's Creative Lighting System (CLS) and features the intelligent-TTL (i-TTL) exposure mode. With compatible SLR cameras (such as the D40, D40x, D50, D60, D70, D70s, D80, D5000, D90, D200, D300, D700, D7000, D2h, D2hs, D2x, D2xs, D3, D3x and F6) can be used as master commander as well as remote flash unit within a CLS wireless lighting setup.

As of November 2011 the SB-900 was replaced by the SB-910 which is technically very similar to the older model. There are only minor changes, such as the push button on the battery lid, semi-transparent function buttons, redesigned soft case, different accessories, and re-adjusted thermal cut off circuit to prevent premature shutdowns. Both units are identical regarding power level, appearance, inner mechanics, and PCB design. SB-900 and SB-910 units are made in Japan.

==== SB-5000 ====
(GN 113 ft, 34.5 m @ 35 mm)

Nikon Speedlight SB-5000 was release January 5, 2016, and is the first model featuring 2.4 GHz radio communication for slave and master mode. It weighs 420 g (without its 4 AA batteries), slightly heavier than the SB-9XX units. The menu system is similar to SB-700 and 9XX series. It uses a dot matrix display with LED illumination unlike SB-700 and 9XX series' EL illuminator. The modeling button makes a return. It is slightly more powerful than the previous models however still less powerful than the SB-800. The head contains a fan activated after a short period of use to prevent overheating. This feature promotes more frequent and consecutive flashes without heat issues.

== Wireless accessories ==
In addition to the above Speedlight units, the following accessories are also available:

- R1C1 Wireless Close-Up System
- SB-R200 Wireless unit (GN 33 ft, 10m @ 24mm)
- SU-800 Wireless Speedlight Commander - no flash, controls other speedlight units (discontinued)

== Gallery ==
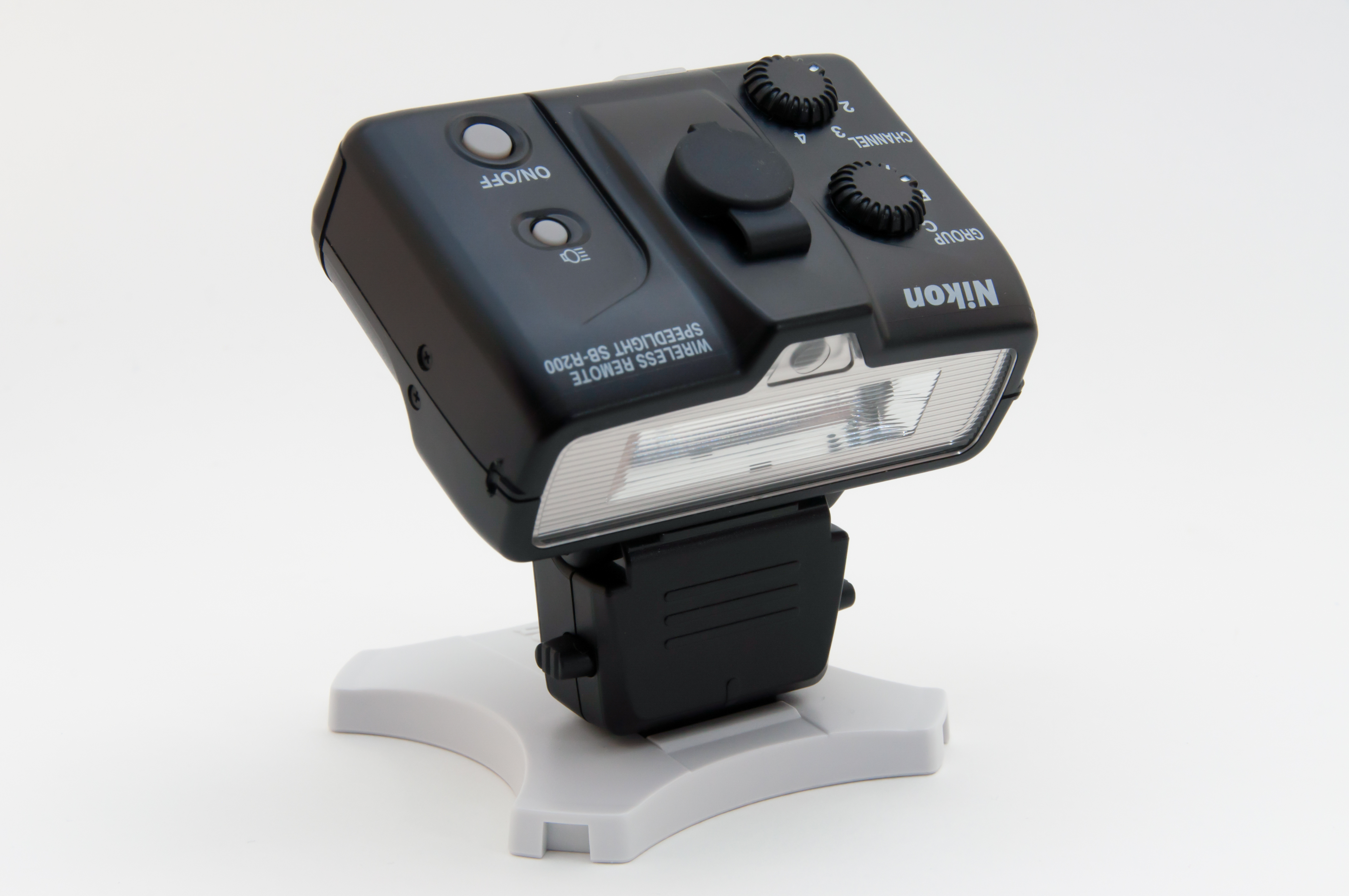
Nikon SB-R200 Wireless Speedlight

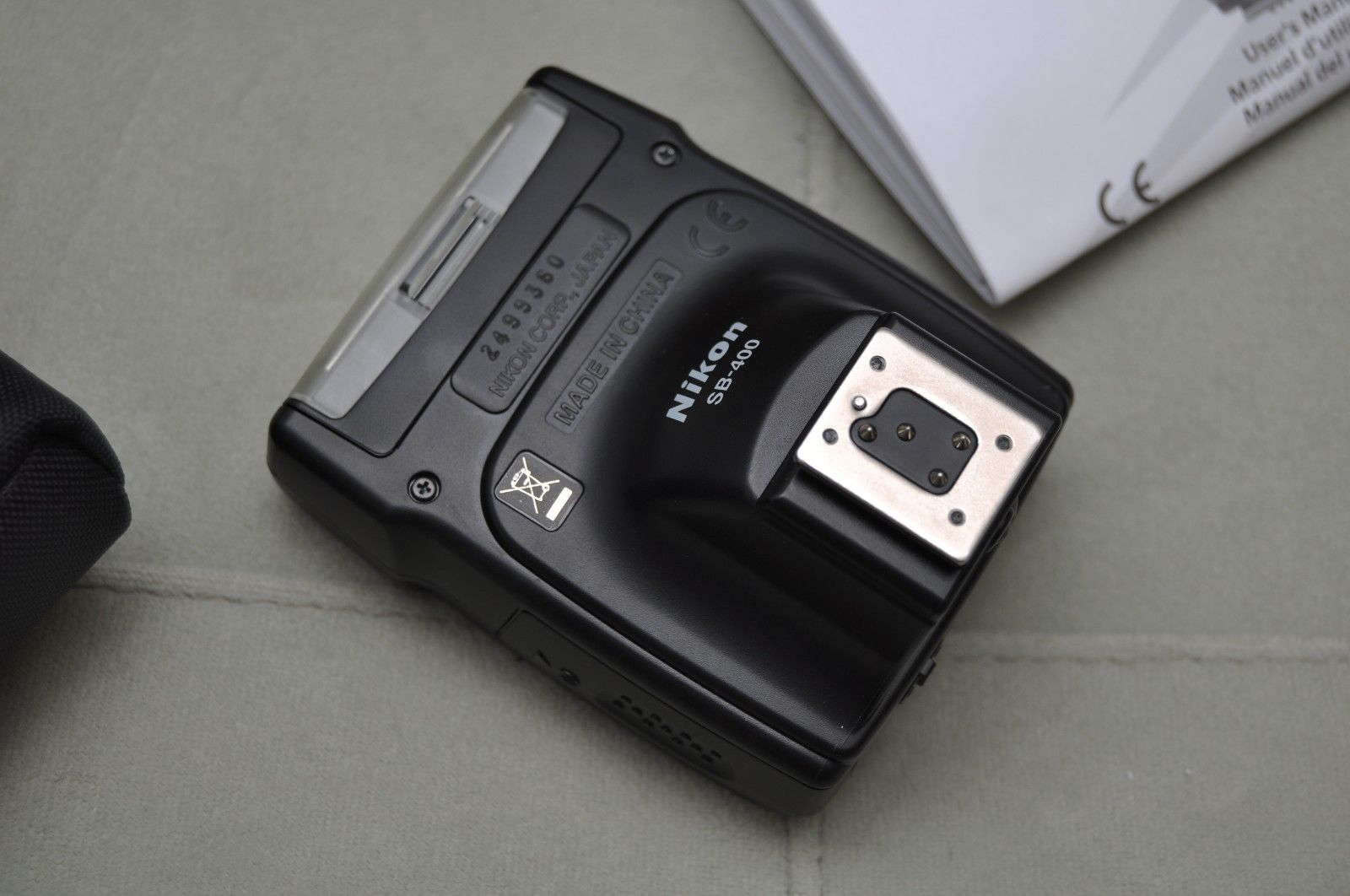
Nikon SB-400 Flash

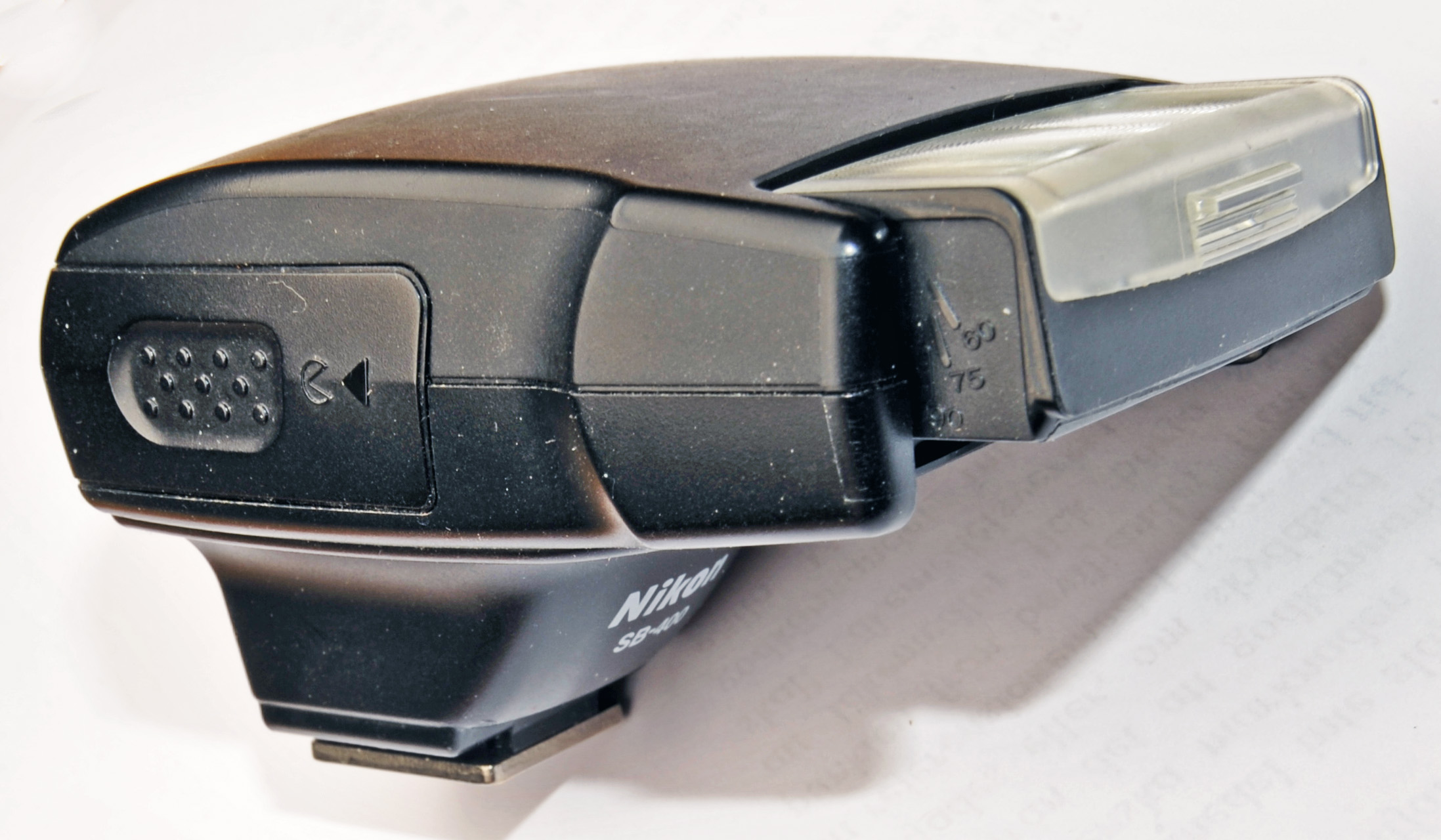
SB-400 - Nikon's simplest and most lightweight flash

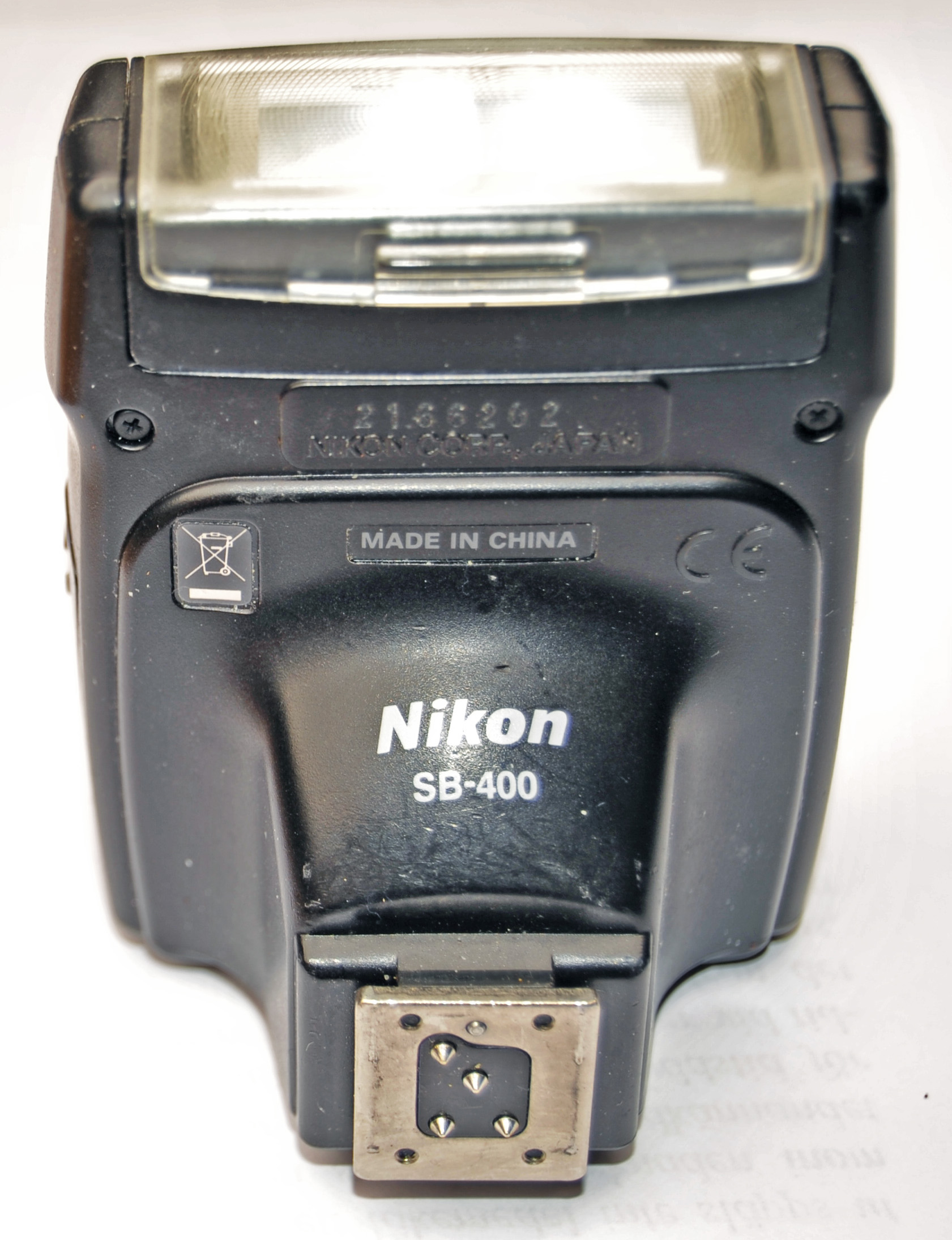
SB-400 is restricted to vertical angling, no swiveling

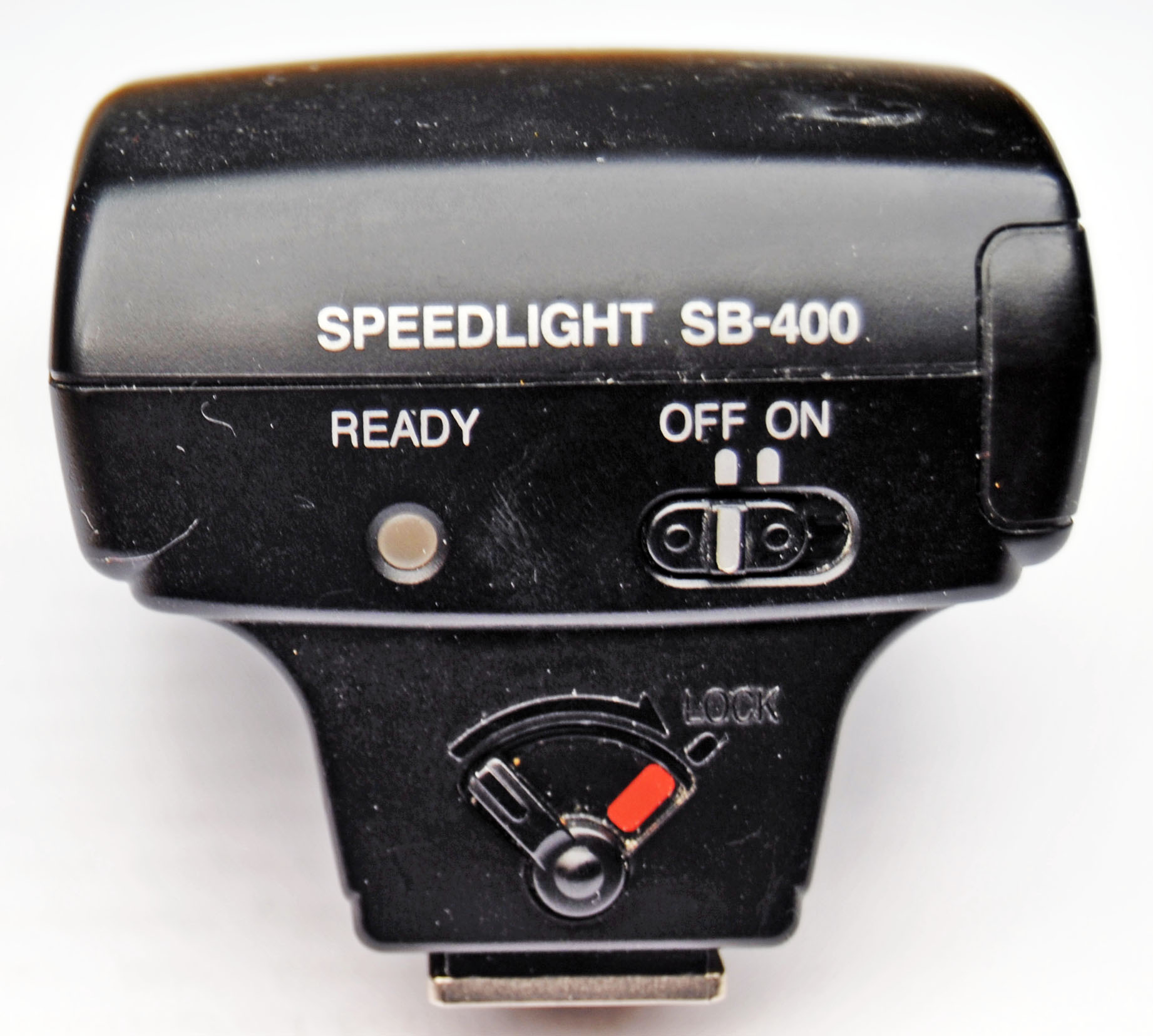

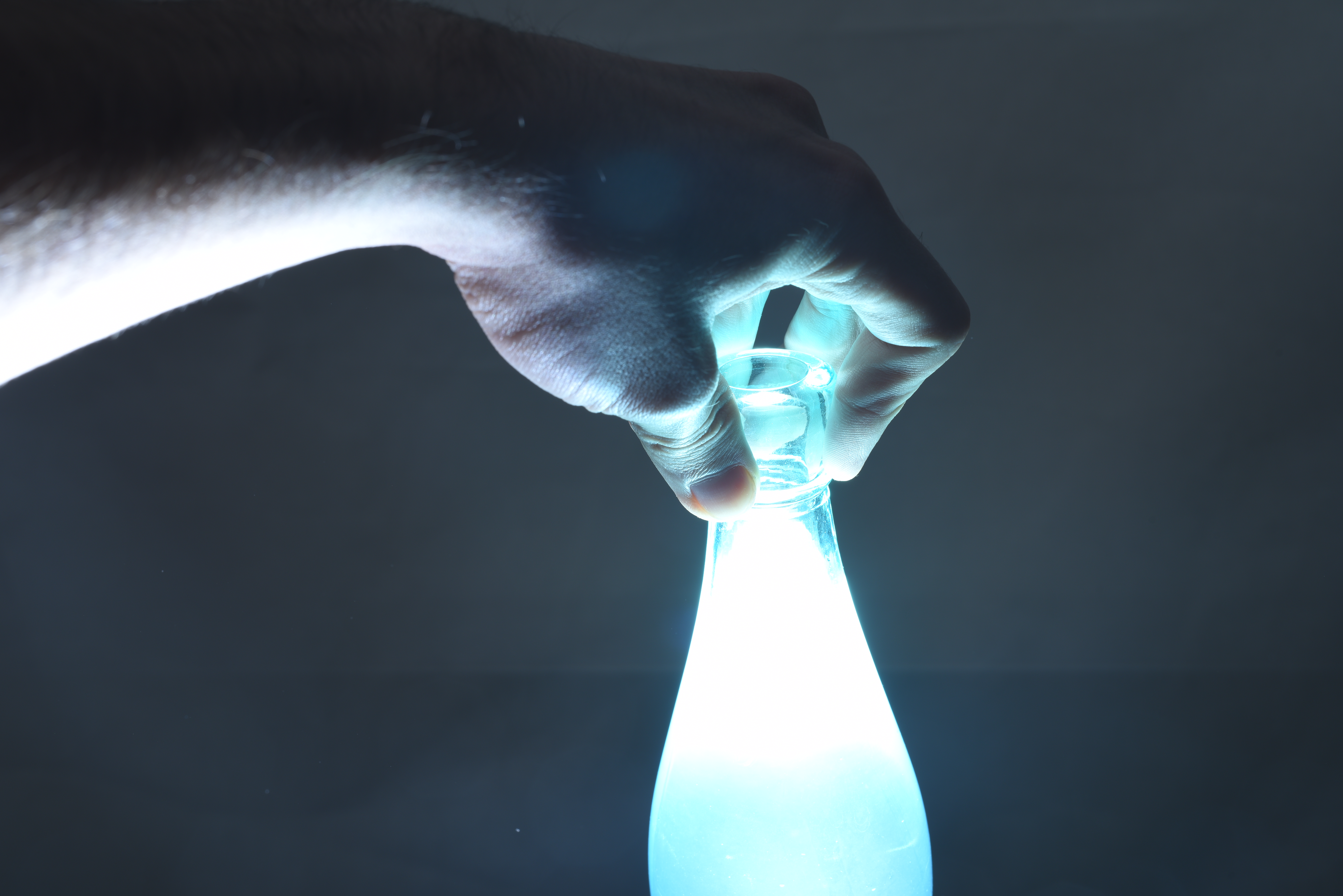
Speedlights can be triggered wirelessly for various lighting effects. Here a Speedlite was placed behind the bottle to give it a glow.

| Sensor | Class | 1999 | 2000 | 2001 | 2002 | 2003 | 2004 | 2005 | 2006 | 2007 | 2008 | 2009 | 2010 | 2011 | 2012 | 2013 | 2014 | 2015 | 2016 | 2017 | 2018 | 2019 | 2020 | 2021 | 2022 | 2023 | 2024 | 2025 | 2026 |
|---|---|---|---|---|---|---|---|---|---|---|---|---|---|---|---|---|---|---|---|---|---|---|---|---|---|---|---|---|---|
| FX (Full-frame) | Flagship | | | | | | | | | | | D3X ^{−P} | | | | | | | | | | | | | | | | | |
| FX (Full-frame) | Flagship | | | | | | | | | | D3 ^{−P} | | D3S ^{−P} | | D4 | | D4S | | D5^{T} | | | | | D6^{T} | | | | | |
| FX (Full-frame) | Professional | | | | | | | | | | | D700 ^{−P} | | | D800/D800E | | | D810/D810A | | | D850 ^{AT} | | | | | | | | |
| FX (Full-frame) | Enthusiast | | | | | | | | | | | | | | | | Df | | | | | | | | | | | | |
| FX (Full-frame) | Enthusiast | | | | | | | | | | | | | | | | | D750 ^{A} | | | | | D780 ^{AT} | | | | | | |
| FX (Full-frame) | Enthusiast | | | | | | | | | | | | | | | D600 | D610 | | | | | | | | | | | | |
| DX (APS-C) | Flagship | | D1^{−E} | D1X^{−E} | | | | D2X^{−E} | | D2Xs^{−E} | | | | | | | | | | | | | | | | | | | |
| DX (APS-C) | Flagship | | D1^{−E} | D1H ^{−E} | | | D2H^{−E} | D2Hs^{−E} | | | | | | | | | | | | | | | | | | | | | |
| DX (APS-C) | Professional | | | | D100^{−E} | | | | D200^{−E} | | D300^{−P} | | D300S^{−P} | | | | | | D500 ^{AT} | | | | | | | | | | |
| DX (APS-C) | Enthusiast | | | | | | D70^{−E} | | D70s^{−E} | D80^{−E} | | D90^{−E} | | D7000 ^{−P} | | | D7100 | D7200 | | | D7500 ^{AT} | | | | | | | | |
| DX (APS-C) | Upper-entry | | | | | | | | D50^{−E} | D40X^{−E*} | D60^{−E*} | | D5000^{A−P*} | | D5100^{A−P*} | D5200^{A−P*} | D5300^{A*} | D5500^{AT*} | | D5600 ^{AT*} | | | | | | | | | |
| DX (APS-C) | Entry-level | | | | | | | | | D40^{−E*} | | | D3000^{−E*} | D3100^{−P*} | | D3200^{−P*} | D3300^{*} | | | D3400^{*} | | D3500^{*} | | | | | | | |
| Early models | | SVC (prototype; 1986); QV-1000C (1988); NASA F4 (1991); E2/E2S (1995); E2N/E2NS (1996); E3/E3S (1998) | | | | | | | | | | | | | | | | | | | | | | | | | | | |
| Sensor | Class | | | | | | | | | | | | | | | | | | | | | | | | | | | | |
| Sensor | Class | 1999 | 2000 | 2001 | 2002 | 2003 | 2004 | 2005 | 2006 | 2007 | 2008 | 2009 | 2010 | 2011 | 2012 | 2013 | 2014 | 2015 | 2016 | 2017 | 2018 | 2019 | 2020 | 2021 | 2022 | 2023 | 2024 | 2025 | 2026 |
