= Nikon D200 =

2005 DX-format digital single-lens reflex camera

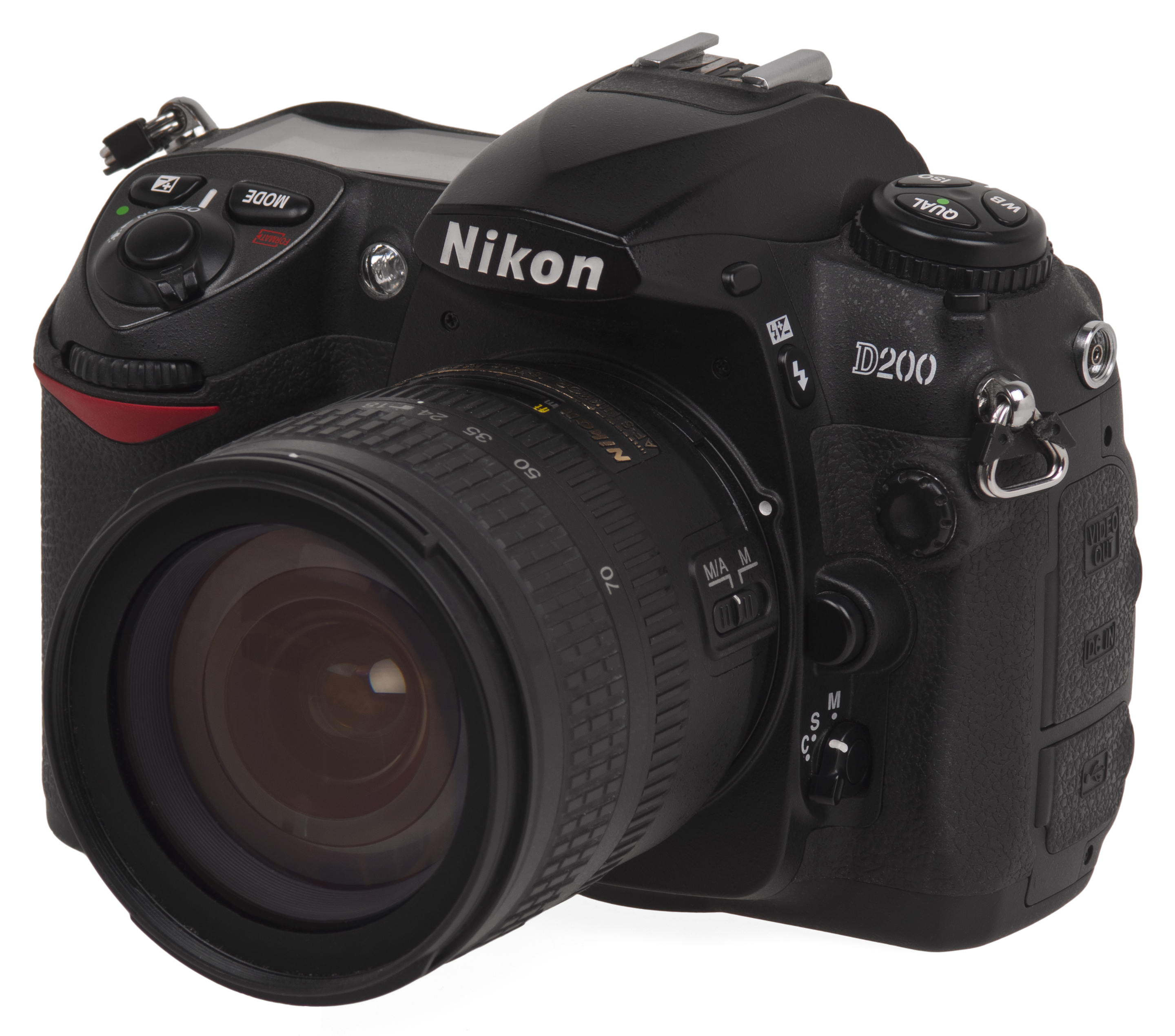

Overview
- Maker: Nikon
- Type: Digital single-lens reflex

Lens
- Lens mount: Nikon F-mount
- Lens: Interchangeable, Nikon F-mount

Sensor/medium
- Sensor: Nikon DX format 23.6 mm × 15.8 mm CCD
- Maximum resolution: 3,872 × 2,592 (10.2 M/10.0 M pixels sensor/effective)
- Film speed: 100 - 1600 in 1, 1/2 or 1/3 EV steps (up to 3200 as boost)
- Recording medium: CompactFlash (Type I or Type II) or Hitachi Microdrive

Focusing
- Focus modes: Instant single-servo AF (S), continuous-servo AF (C), manual (M)
- Focus areas: Normal: 11 areas; Wide: focus area can be selected from 7 areas

Exposure/metering
- Exposure modes: Programmed Auto [P] with flexible program; Shutter-Priority Auto [S]; Aperture Priority Auto [A]; Manual [M]
- Exposure metering: Three-mode through-the-lens (TTL) exposure metering
- Metering modes: 3D Color Matrix Metering II, Center-weighted and Spot

Flash
- Flash: Manual pop-up with button release Guide number (ISO 100, m)
- Flash bracketing: 3 to +1 EV in increments of 1/3 or 1/2 EV

Shutter
- Shutter: Electronically controlled vertical-travel focal plane shutter
- Shutter speed range: 30 s – 1/8000 s, bulb
- Continuous shooting: 5 frame/s, up to 37 / 22 frames (JPEG / RAW)

Viewfinder
- Viewfinder: Optical

Image processing
- White balance: Auto, Six presets, Manual preset (four), Kelvin temperature, Fine tunable
- WB bracketing: 2 to 9 frames in increments of 1, 2 or 3

General
- LCD screen: 2.5-inch (63.5 mm) TFT LCD, 230,000 pixels
- Battery: Nikon EN-EL3e Lithium-Ion battery
- Optional battery packs: MB-D200 battery pack with one or two Nikon EN-EL3e or six AA batteries
- Dimensions: 147×113×74 mm (5.8×4.4×2.9 in)
- Weight: About 830 g without battery, memory card, body cap, or monitor cover
- Made in: Thailand

Chronology
- Predecessor: Nikon D100
- Successor: Nikon D300

The Nikon D200 is a 10.2-megapixel digital single-lens reflex camera that falls between entry-level/midrange DSLR cameras such as the Nikon D40, Nikon D40x, and D80 and high-end models such as the Nikon D2Hs and D2Xs. It was released by the Nikon Corporation in November 2005. The D200 was succeeded by the D300 in August 2007.

== Comparison with other Nikon models ==
Main advantages over the D40, D40x, D50, D60 and D80 cameras include:

- More robust, metal (magnesium alloy) body incorporating environmental seals
- Better matrix metering than D40, D50, or D80 (more sensor areas and less prone to overexposure)
- Higher image resolution than D50 and D40, 10 MP instead of 6 MP (Note that the D40x and D60 are 10.2 MP)
- 11-point autofocus system instead of a 3-point system (D40, D40x and D60)
- Advanced continuous autofocus tracking options
- More straightforward controls; many controls to adjust shooting settings (image quality, ISO, etc.) are directly accessible on the camera without going into the menu system
- Five frames per second continuous shooting
- Larger image buffer
- Four-channel sensor output (faster throughput to support 5 frames per second and finer color gradation)
- Dedicated PC (flash) sync plug
- Ability to save RAW images with selectable size and quality JPEGs (the D50 and D70s can only save basic quality JPEGs with RAW images)
- Ability to save uncompressed RAW images
- Ability to meter with pre-AF lenses
- Ability to connect NMEA 0183 compatible GPS
- EN-EL3e battery with precise status reporting
- Optional vertical battery grip
- Optional vertical grip integrated with wireless transmitter

Compared with Nikon's professional cameras, mainly the D2Xs, the D200 lacks an integrated vertical battery grip, longer battery life, and some minor features. The autofocus system has only one cross-type sensor instead of nine like the D2H, D2Hs, D2X and D2Xs, though it has the same number of focus points (eleven). This means the D200 has the versatility but lacks the precision of the D2 series, particularly with the sensors other than the center cross-type sensor, and in low-light conditions. The D200 offers a lower price and a more compact, lighter body than the D2 series.

== Competition ==
The main competitor for the D200 was the Canon EOS 30D, which had many of the same features. The D200 was also often compared with the Canon EOS 5D, but these two cameras were intended for somewhat different uses – unlike the 30D or 5D, the D200 has weather sealed buttons, allowing it to be used in more demanding outdoor environments.

The Fujifilm S5 Pro is based on the Nikon D200. While both cameras use the same body, the technology used in the imaging systems is different—the Fuji lacks the frame rate and buffer depth of the Nikon, with the Fuji sensor and image processor geared towards higher dynamic range (Fuji Super CCD).

== History ==
The D200 was announced in November 2005 with an initial estimated selling price of $1699.95 US. Some cameras in initial shipments exhibited "banding" in images. The camera won the TIPA 2006 award for Best Digital SLR in the Expert category.

The D200 is often used as a backup body to supplement the high-end professional line of cameras because of its similar feature-set and control layout. Upon its introduction, it was intended to fill the void in the Nikon line-up left by the discontinuation of the Nikon D100. It is in many ways the professional version of the D80.

The D200 has been used in the hit American television series NCIS (TV Series), by the NCIS agents to document crime scenes.

== Features ==
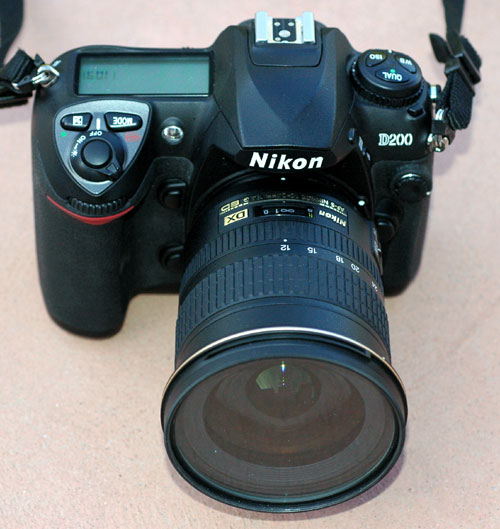
Nikon D200 with 12-24mm DX Nikkor lens

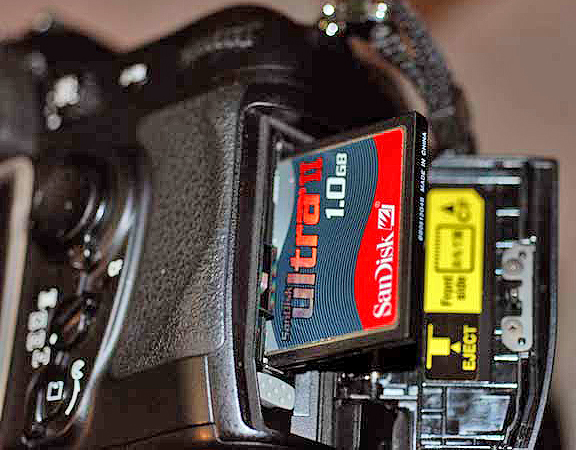
Inserting a CompactFlash (CF) card into a Nikon D200

- Nikon DX format (1.5x angle of view crop compared to 35 mm film format) CCD sensor 23.6 mm × 15.8 mm.
- 10.2-megapixel sensor.
- Nikon F-mount lenses.
- Magnesium alloy weather-sealed body.
- Multi-CAM 1000 autofocus module with 11 sensors in normal mode, or 7 in Wide AF area mode; Single Servo and Continuous Servo focus modes, advanced focus tracking modes, selectable Single Area AF, Dynamic area AF, Group Dynamic AF, and Closest Subject Priority Dynamic AF.
- 5 Frames per second continuous shooting for up to 37 JPEG or 22 RAW images.
- 3D Color Matrix Metering II, including matrix, center weight, and spot metering with AI and AIS manual focus lenses produced since 1977.
- Large, bright viewfinder with 0.94× magnification with 50 mm lens, 95% frame coverage. Optional Magnifying eyepiece DK-21M provides additional magnification by a factor of 1.17× to a total viewfinder magnification of 1.10×.
- 2.5 inch (64 mm) 230,000 pixel LCD for easy image review.
- Similar controls to the D2X.
- 10-pin remote and flash sync terminals on camera.
- GPS compatible with MC-35 GPS cord.
- Advanced battery technology - New EN-EL3e lithium-ion battery 7.4 V/1500 MAH offers up to 1800 shots per charge, according to Nikon's measurement methodology; advanced battery information available in camera menus, status in one percent increments plus overall charge life indication. Five-segment battery meter on top LCD.
- Optional vertical grip MB-D200 holds one or two EN-EL3E lithium-ion or six AA batteries in holder tray, provides vertical shutter release, command dials, and AF-ON button; Vertical grip/wireless transmitter WT-3 available Spring 2006.
- ISO 100–1600, selectable in 1/3, 1/2 or 1 stop increments, up to about ISO 3200 with available Hi Iso Boost (selectable Hi 0.3/ISO 2000, (Hi 0.5/ISO 2200 for 1/2 stop increments), Hi 0.7/ISO 2500, Hi 1.0/ISO 3200). Selectable high ISO noise reduction in camera Off/Low/Normal/High. Noise reduction applied in post processing for RAW files.
- Built-in Speedlight offers balanced fill-flash with Nikon's I-TTL flash system and can fire in commander mode for wireless off-camera firing of other speedlights (SB-600, SB-700, SB-800, SB-R200), controlling up to two groups of speedlights with individual exposure compensation, can also contribute to the actual exposure.
- File formats include JPEG, NEF (Nikon's raw image format compressed and uncompressed), and JPEG+NEF (JPEG size/quality selectable).

== Accessories ==
=== MB-D200 ===
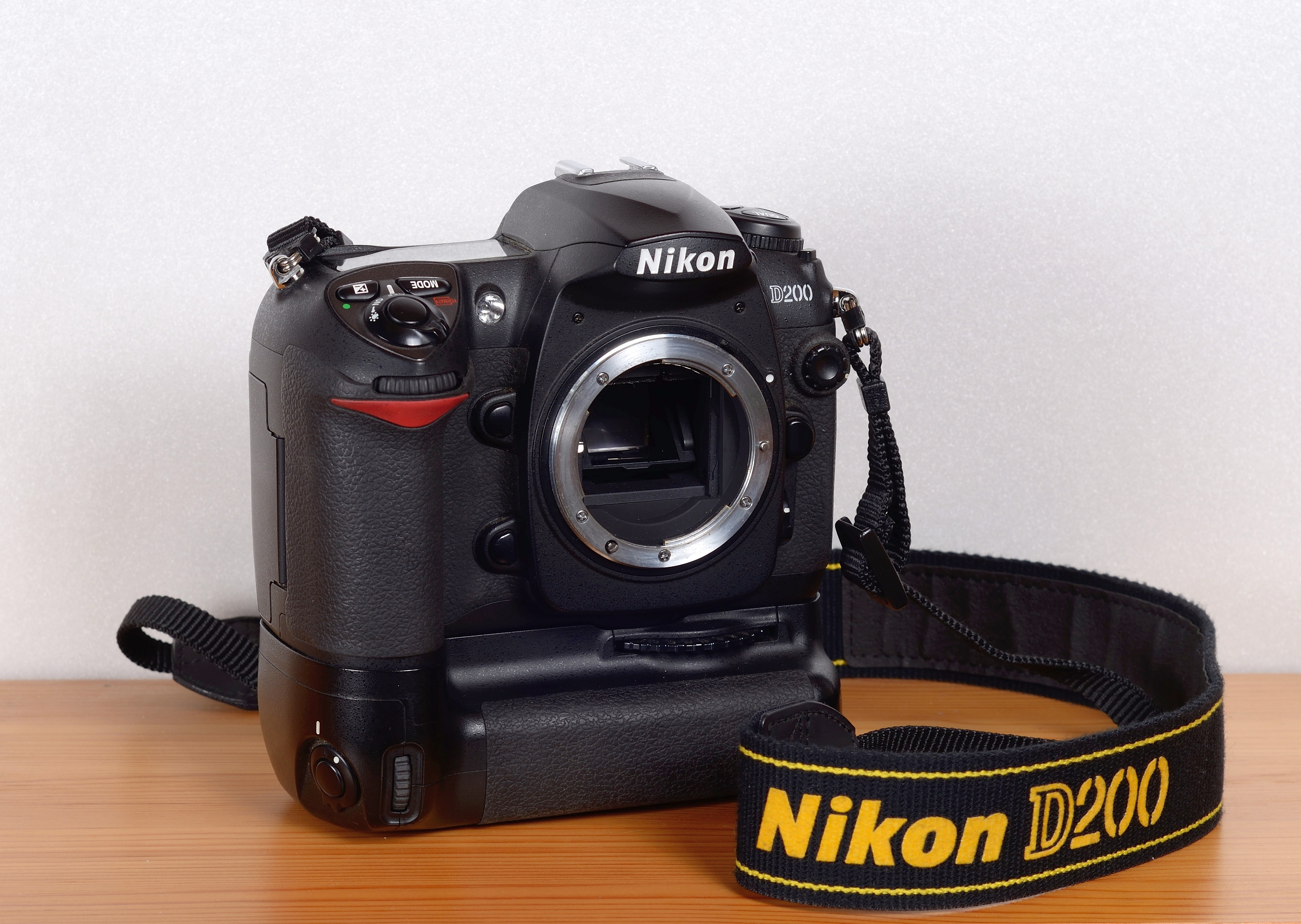
Nikon D200 with MB-D200 battery grip attached

Attachable vertical grip. Has extra shutter button for improved handling at vertical shooting and has room for two batteries, thereby doubling the battery capacity. It also comes with the MS-D200 battery holder which allows the camera to be powered by 6x AA size (LR6 alkaline/HR6 Ni-MH/FR6 Lithium/ZR6 Ni-Mn) batteries. It also has two command dials for adjusting various settings, e.g. aperture and shutter speed, and an AF-on button.

Unlike its predecessor model, the MB-D100 for the Nikon D100, the MB-D200 does not feature a voice recording facility.

=== WT-3a ===
The wireless image transmitter, WT-3a, is capable of transmitting images via IEEE 802.11g WLAN to an FTP server. Although physically similar to the MB-D200 on the outside, the transmitter can only hold one battery, compared to the vertical grip's two. An optional antenna, WA-E1, can be attached to extend the cameras' wireless range from 256 ft (78 m) to a maximum of 840 ft (256 m). It also has an Ethernet jack for direct connection to a computer.

=== EH-6 ===
Power Adapter for the D200 which supplies power instead of using the battery. The power adapter doesn't charge the battery in the camera but rather powers the camera.
Input rating: 100–240 V, 50 or 60 Hz at 1.7 A
Output rating: 13.5 V at 5.0 A

=== EN-EL3e ===
The box of the Nikon EN-EL3e Rechargeable Lithium-ion Battery

Rechargeable lithium-ion battery. 7.4 V, 1500 mA·h rated capacity. Approved chargers:

- MH-18a
- MH-18
- MH-19

Note the EN-EL3e is different from the Nikon EN-EL3 battery used in the Nikon D100.

=== MH-18(a/e) ===
Quick charger for EN-EL3 and EN-EL3e. Battery and charger supplied with the Nikon D200 camera kit.
Input rating: 120–240 V, 50 or 60 Hz at 0.25 A
Output rating: 8.4 V at 0.9 A

=== MC-22 ===
Remote cord terminated with three banana plugs.

- Black = common
- Blue = meter
- Yellow = shutter

Join the black and blue plugs to engage autofocus and meter, then join yellow to already joined black and blue to engage the shutter and take the photo.

| Sensor | Class | '99 | '00 | '01 | '02 | '03 | '04 | '05 | '06 | '07 | '08 | '09 | '10 | '11 | '12 | '13 | '14 | '15 | '16 | '17 | '18 | '19 | '20 | '21 | '22 | '23 | '24 | '25 | '26 |
|---|---|---|---|---|---|---|---|---|---|---|---|---|---|---|---|---|---|---|---|---|---|---|---|---|---|---|---|---|---|
| FX (Full-frame) | Flagship | | | | | | | | | | | D3X ^{−P} | | | | | | | | | | | | | | | | | |
| FX (Full-frame) | Flagship | | | | | | | | | | D3 ^{−P} | | D3S ^{−P} | | D4 | | D4S | | D5^{T} | | | | | D6^{T} | | | | | |
| FX (Full-frame) | Professional | | | | | | | | | | | D700 ^{−P} | | | D800/D800E | | | D810/D810A | | | D850 ^{AT} | | | | | | | | |
| FX (Full-frame) | Enthusiast | | | | | | | | | | | | | | | | Df | | | | | | | | | | | | |
| FX (Full-frame) | Enthusiast | | | | | | | | | | | | | | | | | D750 ^{A} | | | | | D780 ^{AT} | | | | | | |
| FX (Full-frame) | Enthusiast | | | | | | | | | | | | | | | D600 | D610 | | | | | | | | | | | | |
| DX (APS-C) | Flagship | | D1^{−E} | D1X^{−E} | | | | D2X^{−E} | | D2Xs^{−E} | | | | | | | | | | | | | | | | | | | |
| DX (APS-C) | Flagship | | D1^{−E} | D1H ^{−E} | | | D2H^{−E} | D2Hs^{−E} | | | | | | | | | | | | | | | | | | | | | |
| DX (APS-C) | Professional | | | | D100^{−E} | | | | D200^{−E} | | D300^{−P} | | D300S^{−P} | | | | | | D500 ^{AT} | | | | | | | | | | |
| DX (APS-C) | Enthusiast | | | | | | D70^{−E} | | D70s^{−E} | D80^{−E} | | D90^{−E} | | D7000 ^{−P} | | | D7100 | D7200 | | | D7500 ^{AT} | | | | | | | | |
| DX (APS-C) | Upper-entry | | | | | | | | D50^{−E} | D40X^{−E*} | D60^{−E*} | | D5000^{A−P*} | | D5100^{A−P*} | D5200^{A−P*} | D5300^{A*} | D5500^{AT*} | | D5600 ^{AT*} | | | | | | | | | |
| DX (APS-C) | Entry-level | | | | | | | | | D40^{−E*} | | | D3000^{−E*} | D3100^{−P*} | | D3200^{−P*} | D3300^{*} | | | D3400^{*} | | D3500^{*} | | | | | | | |
| Early models | | SVC (prototype; 1986); QV-1000C (1988); NASA F4 (1991); E2/E2S (1995); E2N/E2NS (1996); E3/E3S (1998) | | | | | | | | | | | | | | | | | | | | | | | | | | | |
| Sensor | Class | | | | | | | | | | | | | | | | | | | | | | | | | | | | |
| Sensor | Class | '99 | '00 | '01 | '02 | '03 | '04 | '05 | '06 | '07 | '08 | '09 | '10 | '11 | '12 | '13 | '14 | '15 | '16 | '17 | '18 | '19 | '20 | '21 | '22 | '23 | '24 | '25 | '26 |
