= DX =

DX may refer to:

== In arts and entertainment ==
- DX (album), a 2013 album by Friendzone
- D-Generation X, a professional wrestling stable
  - D-Generation X: In Your House, 1997 pro wrestling PPV
- Design Exchange, a museum of design in Toronto
- Deus Ex, a series of video games
  - Deus Ex (video game), the first game in the series
- Pretty Cure All Stars DX: Everyone's Friends - the Collection of Miracles!, a 2009 anime film

== Businesses ==
- Danish Air Transport (IATA code)
- DX Group, a British mail courier and logistics company
- Dynex Capital Inc, listed on the New York Stock Exchange, ticker symbol DX
- Sunray DX Oil Company, a former American petroleum company, now part of Sunoco

== In science, technology, and mathematics ==
=== Biology and medicine ===
- Diagnosis, Dx or D_{x} in medical shorthand
- DX (Double crossover) molecule or motif, in DNA nanotechnology
- Digital radiography, in the DICOM standard

=== Computing and telecommunications ===
- Developer experience, the experience of using a product or service from a developer's perspective
- Dx, an abbreviation used in relation to the DOCSIS telecommunications standard
- DirectX, an application programming interface collection
- Double word eXternal, in the context of 386DX and 486DX CPUs
- DXing, in amateur radio and broadcasting
- DX register, a 16-bit general-purpose X86 processor register
- Digital transformation, the use of new digital technology in problem-solving applications
- The .dx file format used by OpenDX (Open Data Explorer)

=== Photography ===
- DX encoding, a standard marking for 35 mm and APS film cartridges
- Nikon DX format, a sensor/lens format for Nikon cameras

=== Vehicles ===
- Albatros D.X, a 1918 German prototype single-seat fighter biplane
- Bavarian D X, an 1890 German saturated steam locomotive model
- Fokker D.X, a 1918 Dutch fighter aircraft
- The LNWR DX Goods Class, the largest class of British steam locomotives
- New Zealand DX class locomotive, operated by KiwiRail
- Spruance-class destroyer, codenamed DX, a late-Cold-War U.S. Navy gun-destroyer ship-class

=== Other uses in science, technology, and mathematics ===
- dx, in calculus, a differential in Leibniz's notation of a variable x
- Direct exchange (DX), direct exchange geothermal heat pump, an energy-efficiency environmental control cooling technology
- Yamaha DX Series, FM synthesizers produced by Yamaha Corporation

== Other uses ==
- 510 (number), DX in Roman numerals, a number in the 500s range
- 510 AD, a year in the Common Era (CE), DX in Roman numerals
- DX, an emoticon; see List of emoticons
- DX as an abbreviation for "deluxe," often used in video game titles, i.e. Tetris DX, Mario Kart Arcade GP DX, Sonic Adventure DX
- Delta Chi, a social fraternity
- Deluxe (disambiguation)
- Dx (digraph), in linguistics
- U.S. Dollar Index, abbreviated USDX

== See also ==
- D10 (disambiguation)
- DX1 (disambiguation)
- DX2 (disambiguation)
- DXS (disambiguation)
