= Nikon D100 =

2002 APS-C digital single-lens reflex camera

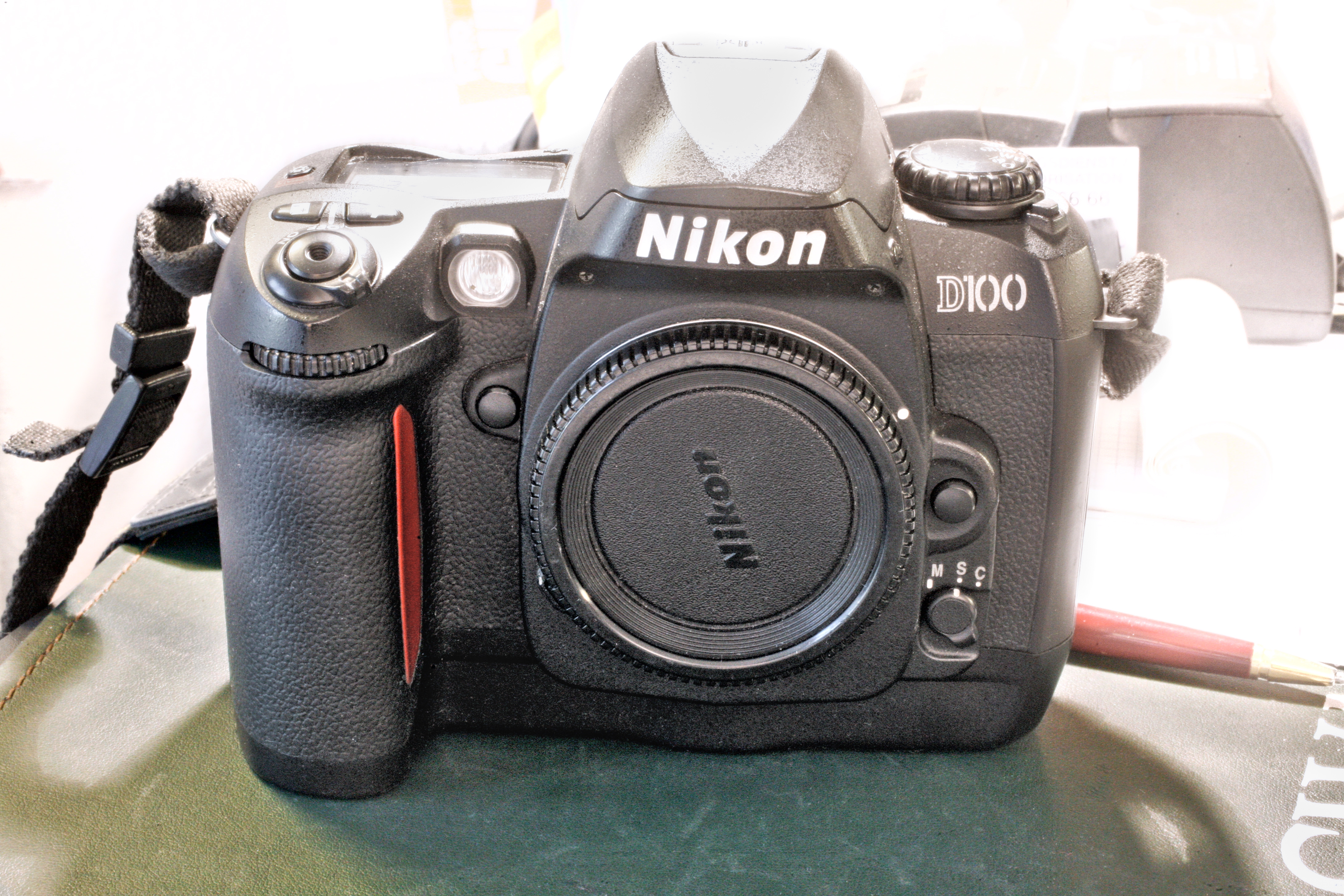

Overview
- Maker: Nikon Corporation
- Type: Digital single-lens reflex
- Production: February 2002 through November 2005 (3 years 9 months)

Lens
- Lens: Interchangeable, Nikon F-mount

Sensor/medium
- Sensor: Nikon DX format 23.7 mm × 15.6 mm CCD
- Maximum resolution: 3,008 × 2,000 (6.0 megapixels)
- Film speed: 200-1600 ISO in 1/3EV steps, 6400 special mode
- Storage media: CompactFlash (Type I or Type II) or Hitachi Microdrive

Focusing
- Focus modes: CAM 900, standard Nikon AF

Exposure/metering
- Exposure metering: 10 segment

Shutter
- Shutter: vertical-travel focal-plane shutter
- Shutter speed range: 30 to 1/4000s, bulb mode
- Continuous shooting: 3 frame/s (6 frame buffer)

Viewfinder
- Viewfinder: 95% frame coverage, 0.8× magnification, Optical pentaprism

General
- LCD screen: 1.8-inch (46 mm) 118,000 pixel TFT
- Dimensions: 144×116×81 mm (5.7×4.6×3.2 in)
- Weight: approx. 700 g
- Made in: Japan

Chronology
- Successor: Nikon D200

The Nikon D100 is a discontinued 6-megapixel digital single-lens reflex camera made by Nikon Corporation and designed as a consumer alternative to the professional D1 series cameras. It was the precursor of both the more advanced D70 and D200 cameras with the former continuing the consumer offerings and the latter beginning an advanced consumer and professional lineup. The D70 kept the controls which the D100 inherited from the F80 film camera, which then evolved into the D7500 and D750 offerings, in cropped frame and full frame respectively. The D200 adopted the controls of the D1 series.

== History and Design ==
It was introduced on February 21, 2002 at the Photo Marketing Association Annual Convention and Trade Show as a direct competitor to the Canon EOS D60. With a price of US$1,999 for the body only in the United States, it was the second 6-megapixel DSLR to break the $2000 barrier, after the EOS D60.

Although the name D100 suggested that it was a digital version of the Nikon F100, the camera design more closely resembles the Nikon F80 (also known as Nikon N80 in the United States), which is a much more consumer-oriented camera than the professional F100. The price of the camera dropped over time to $1699 in May 2003, and $1499 in December 2003. In the Spring of 2004 Nikon released the D70, which offered superior features to the D100 at a lower price of $999. However, Nikon continued to produce the D100 until 2005 when a more advanced and professional-oriented successor, the Nikon D200, was released.

== Features ==
- 6.0 effective megapixels rendering 3,008 x 2,000-pixel images
- CCD sensor with ISO 200-1600
- Raw (Nikon NEF — compressed or uncompressed), JPEG (specifically JFIF), or TIFF
- 3D Matrix Metering — 10 sensor matrix meter
- Custom / Preset, Fixed or Auto White Balance options
- Built-in Speedlight with D-TTL flash control — 18 GN [at ISO 200]
- Three color modes (sRGB I, Adobe RGB, and sRGB III, (wider gamut of greens and blues)
- Five-Area Autofocus with CAM-900 chip
- Top shutter speed of 1/4,000s and flash sync speed up to 1/180s.
- Has a self-timer, allowing times of 2, 5, 10 and 20s
- USB 1.1 interface
- Compatible with CompactFlash cards Type I and Type II, including IBM (and Hitachi's) MicroDrive hard drives up to 4 GB. Firmware v2.0 is required for body to recognize cards/drives larger than 2 GB, and cards/drives must be initially formatted as FAT32 in a computer. (Early v1.x firmware supported FAT16 only, so without the firmware upgrade the D100 will only be able to use or "see" 2 GB of available memory on larger cards.)
- Optional Multi Function Battery Pack MB-D100 accepts six 1.5 V LR6 (AA-size alkaline) batteries or one or two Li-Ion EN-EL3 batteries for extended shooting capability. Features voice memo recording/playback function, vertical shutter release button, Command and Sub Command Dials, AF start button and a 10-pin remote terminal.

Sensor	Class	'99	'00	'01	'02	'03	'04	'05	'06	'07	'08	'09	'10	'11	'12	'13	'14	'15	'16	'17	'18	'19	'20	'21	'22	'23	'24	'25	'26
FX (Full-frame)	Flagship											D3X ^{−P}																	
FX (Full-frame)	Flagship										D3 ^{−P}		D3S ^{−P}		D4		D4S		D5^{T}					D6^{T}					
FX (Full-frame)	Professional											D700 ^{−P}			D800/D800E			D810/D810A			D850 ^{AT}								
FX (Full-frame)	Enthusiast																Df												
FX (Full-frame)	Enthusiast																	D750 ^{A}					D780 ^{AT}						
FX (Full-frame)	Enthusiast															D600	D610												
DX (APS-C)	Flagship		D1^{−E}	D1X^{−E}				D2X^{−E}		D2Xs^{−E}																			
DX (APS-C)	Flagship		D1^{−E}	D1H ^{−E}			D2H^{−E}	D2Hs^{−E}																					
DX (APS-C)	Professional				D100^{−E}				D200^{−E}		D300^{−P}		D300S^{−P}						D500 ^{AT}										
DX (APS-C)	Enthusiast						D70^{−E}		D70s^{−E}	D80^{−E}		D90^{−E}		D7000 ^{−P}			D7100	D7200			D7500 ^{AT}								
DX (APS-C)	Upper-entry								D50^{−E}	D40X^{−E*}	D60^{−E*}		D5000^{A−P*}		D5100^{A−P*}	D5200^{A−P*}	D5300^{A*}	D5500^{AT*}		D5600 ^{AT*}									
DX (APS-C)	Entry-level									D40^{−E*}			D3000^{−E*}	D3100^{−P*}		D3200^{−P*}	D3300^{*}			D3400^{*}		D3500^{*}							
Early models		SVC (prototype; 1986); QV-1000C (1988); NASA F4 (1991); E2/E2S (1995); E2N/E2NS (1996); E3/E3S (1998)																											
Sensor	Class																												
Sensor	Class	'99	'00	'01	'02	'03	'04	'05	'06	'07	'08	'09	'10	'11	'12	'13	'14	'15	'16	'17	'18	'19	'20	'21	'22	'23	'24	'25	'26
