= Speedlite =

Speedlite may refer to:

- Canon Speedlite, a Canon brand of electronic flashes for their EOS camera system
- Ricoh Speedlite, a Ricoh brand of electronic flashes

== See also ==
- Nikon Speedlight, a Nikon brand of electronic flashes for their camera system
