= DX2 =

DX2 may refer to:

- Pretty Cure All Stars DX2: Light of Hope - Protect the Rainbow Jewel!, a 2010 Japanese anime film
- (5347) 1985 DX2, a main-belt minor planet
- Intel DX2, a CPU produced by Intel
- Deus Ex: Invisible War, a 2003 role-playing video game
- Shin Megami Tensei: Liberation Dx2, a 2018 role-playing video game

== See also ==
- DX (disambiguation)
