= Vundabar =

American indie rock band

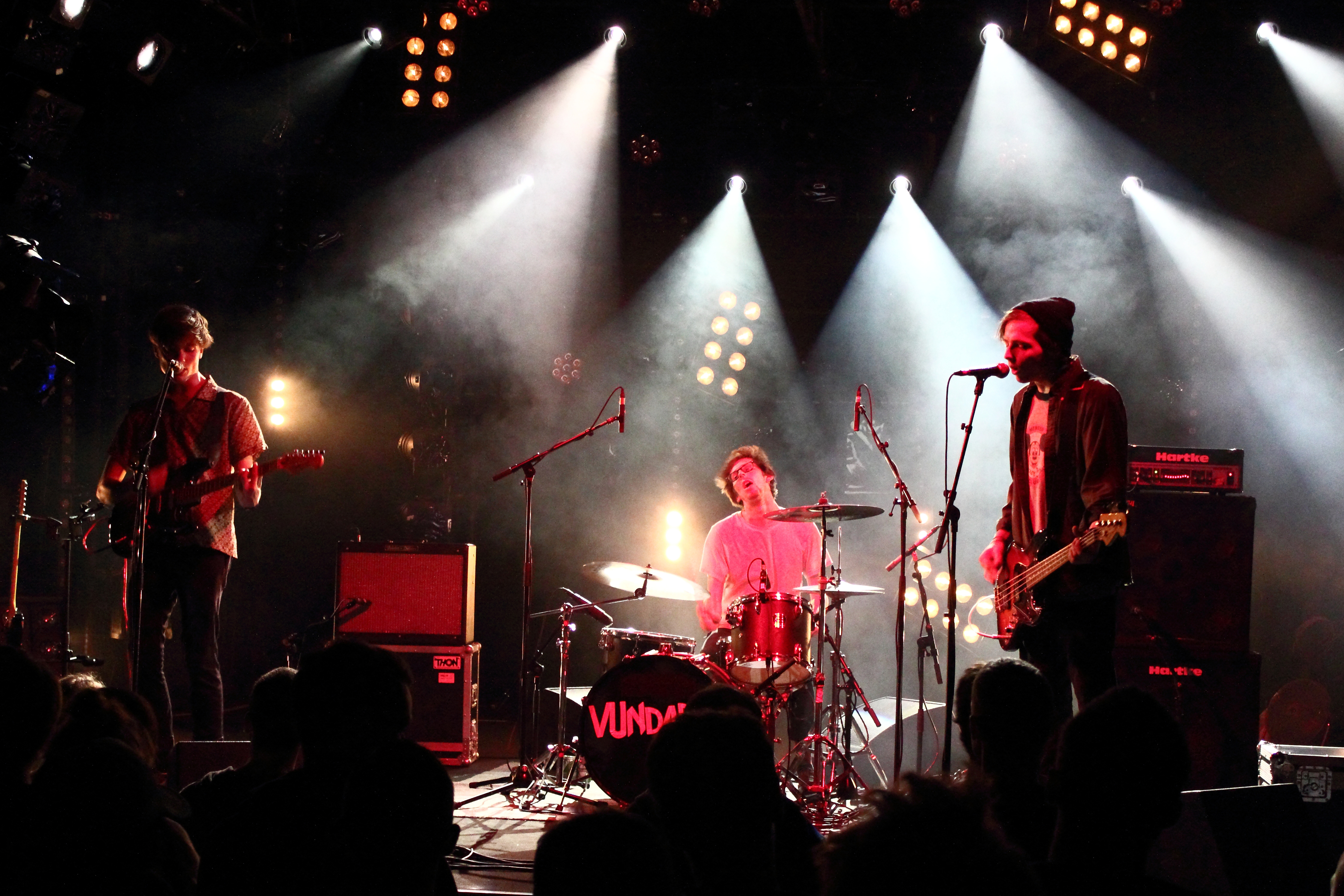
- Vundabar playing at Le Confort Moderne in Poitiers, 2014

Background information
- Origin: Boston, Massachusetts
- Genres: Indie rock; post-punk revival; jangle pop; surf rock
- Years active: 2012–present
- Labels: Gawk, Loma Vista
- Members: Brandon Hagen; Drew McDonald; Zack Abramo
- Past members: Grayson Kirtland
- Website: vundabar.biz

Vundabar is an American indie rock band from Boston, Massachusetts. The band consists of Brandon Hagen (vocals, guitar), Drew McDonald (drums, synthesizer), and Zack Abramo (bass). Vundabar is most well known for their 2015 song "Alien Blues," which went viral on TikTok in 2021.

Vundabar released their first full-length album in 2013 titled Antics. In 2015, they released their second album titled Gawk. In February 2018, Vundabar released their third album, titled Smell Smoke which was recorded by Keith Abrams at Headroom Studios in Philadelphia. Their fourth album Either Light was released in 2020. Vundabar released their fifth full-length album Devil for the Fire on April 15, 2022.

On September 16, 2022, they released a musical compilation entitled Good Old, and on May 5, 2023, they released the singles Digital Forest and Sugar Pill. From June 2024 to March 6, 2025, five singles were released for their sixth full-length album, Surgery And Pleasure, which was released by Loma Vista Recordings on March 7, 2025. Almost a year later, on March 6, 2026, Surgery And Pleasure (Deluxe) was released, containing five singles.

== Band history ==
Before Vundabar was founded, Brandon Hagen and Drew McDonald were in a band called No Nada with their friends from school. The band lasted from c. 2009 to 2012, when they separated because multiple members were leaving for college. Some of No Nada's songs have been found through Hagen's now retired SoundCloud, as well as through other sources. Vundabar was originally just Hagen and McDonald, with fluctuating bassists. While McDonald was attending Lesley University, he met Zack Abramo, who was soon incorporated as their main bassist. In 2013, the trio released their debut full-length album titled Antics, which was recorded in McDonald's room and mixed on Garageband. In 2014, Vundabar went on their first tour, which took place in France. This allowed them to get the money to record their second album, Gawk in 2015, in which they adopted a more gritty tone and added a post-punk sound to the mix.

In June 2016, a new member of the band was present in an interview. The former bassist, Zack Abramo, left the band to work on his own music group, being the lead vocalist and guitarist for Crag Mask. Vundabar's new bass player was Grayson Kirtland. He continued to appear in live shows and interviews as Vundabar's bassist until late 2018, when the band tweeted about their next show, in which Abramo would be joining them again.

On February 23rd 2018, their third studio-album was released titled "Smell Smoke". It was originally titled "Crack Mask" according to an interview with Audiotree. For their fourth album Either Light they changed their style and their songwriting technique to a much softer and quieter sound. Hagen revealed in an interview with Allston Pudding that they wrote much of the songs on piano or synthesizer instead of guitar.

Vundabar released the "Devil For the Fire" on April 15, 2022, following the release of two singles from the album, "Aphasia" and "Ringing Bell". In the same year they released their Compilation Album "Good Old" on September 16, which consisted of several acoustic covers of previous songs, including "Alien Blues" and "Listless Blue", as well as several previously unreleased songs recorded between Gawk and Smell Smoke.

Prior to the release of their most recent album, "Surgery and Pleasure" and starting in 2024, Vundabar released several singles including, "Spades", "Life is a Movie", and several versions of "I Got Cracked". All of which were included in "Surgery and Pleasure", which was ultimately released on March 7.

On August 14, 2025, the band released the single "Big Bad Bubble Boy," which was soon followed by "Death Punch" on January 22, 2026, and "The Thing," a cover of the Pixies song of the same name, was released on February 5. On March 6, the band released the Deluxe version of Surgery And Pleasure.

Vundabar also announced that they would be embarking on both a U.S. and Europe tour during the Spring and Summer of 2026 to honor their sophomore album, Gawk's, 10 year anniversary.

== Musical style ==
Their musical style is described as indie rock with elements of post-punk, jangle pop and surf rock. Allmusic describes their style as "jangly, fuzzed-out math- and surf-tinged indie rock shot through with plenty of post-punk spirit".

As influences, the band named Dick Dale, singer Brandon Hagen also named the Osees, bassist Zack Abramo named electronic music such as Burial, and drummer Drew McDonald named Tame Impala. Hagen states bands such as Radiohead, Nirvana and the Smashing Pumpkins as childhood musical inspirations. He has stated Leonard Cohen as a lyrical influence.

On their first three albums, Vundabar mainly played their music on guitar, bass and drums. On their albums Either Light and Devil for the Fire, they also used synthesizers, electronic drum sounds and other instruments like piano or Omnichord.

== Gawk Records ==
In an interview with Sound of Boston, McDonald explains that the band started a cassette label named Gawk Records in order to avoid financial pressures of signing to a label and to foster a community of artists. The record label has also released a self-titled EP by the Philadelphia band Straw Hats in 2016, and co-released the self titled album by the band Horse Jumper of Love in 2016. Both of these releases are on the label's Bandcamp.

== Band members ==
Current

- Brandon Hagen – lead vocals, guitars (2012–present)
- Drew McDonald – drums, percussion, synthesizers (2012–present)
- Zack Abramo – bass, backing vocals (2012–2016, 2018–present)

Past

- Grayson Kirtland – bass, backing vocals (2016–2018)
- Cliff Bowe - bass, backing vocals (a few dates in late 2015)

Timeline

== Discography ==
=== Studio albums ===
- Antics (2013)
- Gawk (2015)
- Smell Smoke (2018)
- Either Light (2020)
- Devil for the Fire (2022)
- Surgery and Pleasure (2025)

=== Compilation albums ===
- Good Old (2022)

=== EPs ===
- Vundabar on Audiotree Live (2017)
- Vundabar (2014)
- Devil for the Fire (2021)

=== Singles ===
- "Shuffle" (2017)
- "Acetone" (2017)
- "Glass Hand" (2017)
- "Devil for the Fire" (2021)
- "Alien Blues (Redux)" (2022)
- "Digital Forest / Sugar Pill" (2023)
- "I Got Cracked" (2024)
- "I Got Cracked (Busted)" (2024)
- "I Got Cracked (Yot Club Version)" (2024)
- "Life is a Movie" (2024)
- "Spades" (2025)
- "I Need You" (2025)
- "Beta Fish" (2025)
- "Big Bad Bubble Boy" (2025)
- "Death Punch" (2026)
- The Thing (2026)
- I Need U (2026)
