= D2X =

D2X may be:

- Nikon D2X, a digital SLR camera manufactured by Nikon
- D2X (source port), an open source port of the game Descent II
- D2x, an American rapper
