= DX1 =

DX1 may refer to:

- Yamaha DX1, an FM synthesizer
- (7202) 1995 DX1, a main-belt minor planet
- Deus Ex (video game), a 2000 action role-playing video game

== See also ==
- DX (disambiguation)
