= D10 =

D10, or similar, may refer to:

== Transportation ==
=== Aircraft ===
- Albatros D.X, a 1918 German prototype single-seat fighter biplane
- Dewoitine D.10, a 1920s Dewoitine aircraft
- Dunne D.10, a British Dunne aircraft
- Fokker D.X, a 1918 Dutch fighter aircraft
- ProFe D-10 Tukan, a two-seat motor glider

=== Ships ===
- ARA Almirante Brown (D-10), a destroyer that was commissioned into the Argentine Navy in 1983
- HMS E2, ordered as HMS D10, a 1912 British E class submarine
- HMS Audacity (D10), a 1941 British Royal Navy escort carrier
- HMS Intrepid (D10), a 1936 British Royal Navy I-class destroyer
- HMS Rajah (D10), a 1943 British escort aircraft carrier

=== Vehicles and trains ===
- Bavarian D X, an 1890 German saturated steam locomotive model
- LNER Class D10, a class of British steam locomotives
- Allis-Chalmers D 10, a tractor
- Caldwell D-10, a car competing in Formula Super Vee
- Caterpillar D10, a track-type tractor

=== Roadways ===
- D10 road (Croatia)
- D10 motorway (Czech Republic)
- State road D.010 (Turkey)

== Science and technology ==
- D10, or SMPTE 356M, a specification for a professional video format
- D-10 tank gun, a Soviet World War II 100mm tank gun
- Pentagonal trapezohedron used as a 10-sided gaming die
- d^{10}, a d electron count
- ATC code D10, a classification of anti-acne preparations
- D 10, slang for a 10-milligram diazepam tablet

== Other uses ==
- D10 club of countries, a proposed forum of democratic countries
- D10 Slav Defense, a chess opening
- a ten-sided gaming die in the shape of a pentagonal trapezohedron
- Delta 10 THC, a mildly psychoactive cannabinoid.

== See also ==
- Dio (disambiguation)
- DX (disambiguation)
