= DXD =

DXD can refer to:

- Destruction By Definition, ska-core band The Suicide Machines' first album.
- Digital by Digital, a section of the Cinequest Film Festival's competition
- Digital eXtreme Definition, a professional audio format.
- Disney Xtreme Digital, a community web site by Disney, similar to MySpace
- Disney XD, the Disney channel that replaced Toon Disney.
- Drag x Drive, a video game for Nintendo Switch 2.
- High School DxD, a Japanese light novel series written by Ichiei Ishibumi.
