= LBCAST =

Photo sensor

LBCAST (lateral buried charge accumulator and sensing transistor array) is a type of photo sensor which the manufacturer claims is simpler and thus smaller and faster than CMOS sensors. It was developed over ten years by Nikon, in parallel with other manufacturer's development of CMOS, and resulted in shipping product in 2003.

Both CMOS and LBCAST technologies branched from researchers discussions of "amplifying sensors" as a way to develop an imaging sensor with lower power requirements than the already-existing CCD sensor technology, for use in portable devices such as DSLR cameras.

From the Nikon Website:

"In July 2003, Nikon introduced LBCAST- a completely new type of image sensor, different from CCD and CMOS, that is a high-speed, power-efficient, low-noise device to be installed in Nikon's flagship camera, the D2Hs."

"... Compared with conventional sensors, it saves more power and achieves less dark noise. (Dark noise is a phenomenon in which randomly spaced bright pixels appear in images due to the heat from the image device during shooting). Also, LBCAST increases image processing speed and improves sensitivity, contrast and color reproduction."

== Comparison between LBCAST and CMOS photo sensors ==
The main differences between LBCAST and CMOS-based sensors appear to be those given below:

- LBCAST divides the photosites to be read out into two channels by colour, red and blue photosites—making up 50% of the total number of photosites between them, as in CMOS and CCD colour sensors—accumulate using one read-channel, while green photosites—which make up the other 50% of total pixels, as in CMOS and CCD—accumulate in a dedicated channel.

This division is to speed reading, and the separation of green pixels, to which the human eye is most sensitive, reduces noise artifacts which might otherwise be introduced by residual electrical charge in the accumulation circuitry, acquired previously from reading a pixel of a different colour.

Red and blue are significantly less important in human sight, and so presumably a decision was made not to keep separate read channels for the two colours, in order to simplify the circuit design for practical use -- at least in the described version of LBCAST technology.

- Each photosite in LBCAST uses a single JFET transistor in place of two MOSFET transistors used for the separate tasks of photosite read-out selection and signal amplification, in CMOS technology. In total, CMOS uses four transistors per photosite, where LBCAST manages with three.
- Charge to be (re-)distributed between components in the sensor during use are channeled via the LBCAST lower layers, where CMOS channels this charge over the surface layer. This difference is also claimed to reduce the presence of noise artifacts.
- The simpler circuitry required translates into more space for light to be received, since wiring and opaque masking takes less space.
- The simpler circuitry required translates into fewer layers of material in the silicon chip meaning that tangential light requires less correction in order to traverse to the depth at which the photons result in signal, simplifying the need for lensing at each pixel or photosite, and therefore theoretically, attaining greater image uniformity.

== Uses of LBCAST sensors ==
As at end 2006, the Nikon D2H and the D2Hs were the only publicly available cameras known to carry the sensor. Nikon has opted to use CCDs sourced from Sony in most of their low and mid range cameras and used a CMOS sensor in the flagship D2Xs/D2x. The LBCAST sensor in the D2Hs has remained at 4.1MP.

With the advent of the D3, D700 and D300 cameras in 2007 and 2008, all featuring CMOS sensor technology, it is unknown whether LBCAST plays a part in the design of the CMOS sensor of either, since Nikon's implementation of LBCAST is an adaptation of CMOS, and it is therefore technically correct to refer to the known instances of LBCAST as CMOS, Nikon has not been forthcoming to requests for specific information on the D3 sensor and Nikon have claimed in the past that LBCAST would be further developed.

== Criticisms of LBCAST sensors ==
The following weaknesses have been cited as affecting the Nikon D2H, although whether these issues have origins specific to LBCAST, and whether LBCAST necessitates these problems, is not known.

- Colour cast—generally (and by definition) colour correction is a fundamental requirement of imaging in any medium where incident light quality is variable, including unaided human vision, and so this possibly a software issue.
- Infra-red pollution—incident infra-red light is usually filtered on image sensors, using a specific thin film dedicated to this task (but which may serve an additional purpose in protecting the relatively much more expensive sensor component from contamination and damage), and so this issue, if truly the result of ir pollution, may be a problem which is independent of the LBCAST technology of the sensor.
- Low resolution—it is not known whether the relatively low resolution of the D2H and D2Hs in comparison with other professional cameras of the day is a technological limitation of LBCAST, a business management or marketing decision, or whether it has other causes such as gradual ramping-up of manufacturing capability of a new technology by Nikon, who did not appear previously to have the capacity to have novel sensors manufactured to their specification. It is known that there is a market for high-speed, power efficient cameras where higher resolution is not required, for example newspaper journalism.
