= Deluxe =

Deluxe or De Luxe may refer to:

== Businesses and brands ==
=== Media ===
- Deluxe Media, an American multinational multimedia and entertainment company, originally the De Luxe film processing laboratory
- Deluxe Music, a German music television channel
- De Luxe Records, later DeLuxe Records, a record company and label that flourished in the 1940s and 50s
- Deluxe Records, the record label of German hip-hop artist Samy Deluxe

=== Automobiles ===
- De Luxe, an American automobile manufactured in 1907 by the De Luxe Motor Car Company
- De Luxe Ford, a Ford automobile product line
- Austin de Luxe, a Spanish car 1974–1975
- Car de Luxe, an American automobile 1906–1910
- Plymouth De Luxe, an automobile model 1933–1942 and 1946–1950

=== Other businesses ===
- Deluxe Corporation, an American payments and data company founded as Deluxe Check Printers
- Deluxe Distribution, an American skateboarding company

== People ==
- Deluxe (musician) (Xoel López, born 1977), Spanish alternative rock musician
- Daniel Deluxe (Daniel Alexandrovich, fl. from 2013) Russian electronic music producer
- Funkstar De Luxe (Martin Aulkjær Ottesen, born 1973), Danish music producer
- Matsuko Deluxe (born 1972), Japanese columnist, essayist, and TV personality
- Samy Deluxe (Samy Sorge, born 1977), German rapper and record producer
- Supremme de Luxe (Daniel Blesa, born 1979), Spanish actor, singer and drag queen
- Tim Deluxe (Tim Liken, born 1977), British DJ and producer

== Other uses in music ==
- "De-Luxe", a song by Lush from the 1990 EP Mad Love
- De-Luxe (album), by Yōko Oginome, 1993
- Deluxe (band), a French band
- Deluxe (Better Than Ezra album), 1993
- Deluxe (Harmonia album), 1975
- Deluxe EP, by Duffy, 2009
- Ducks Deluxe, an English pub rock band of the 1970s

== See also ==
- DX (disambiguation)
- Delux, a Mexican band
- Dollie de Luxe, Norwegian pop duo
- Johnny Deluxe, a Danish band
- Pepe Deluxé, a Finnish band
