= List of arcade video games: 0–9 =

This is a list of arcade video games organized alphabetically by name. It does not include PC or console games unless they were also released in video arcades. See Lists of video games for related lists.

Title	Alternate title(s)	Release date	Developer(s)	Genre(s)	Ref(s)
'88 Games	Konami '88 Hyper Sports Special ^{JP}	1988	Konami	Sports	
'96 Flag Rally	—	1996	Promat, Ltd	Racing	
'99: The Last War	Son of Phoenix; Repulse	1985	Kyugo; Proma	Fixed shooter	
?Shikou Puzzle Game! SANKOKUSHI	—	1996	Mitchell Corporation	Mahjong	
005	—	1981	Sega	Maze	
1 On 1 Government	—	2000	Tecmo	Sports	
10-Yard Fight	—	1984	Irem	Sports	
1000 Miglia: Great 1000 Miles Rally	Great 1000 Miles Rally	1994	Kaneko	Racing	
18 Challenge Pro Golf	—	1982	Data East	Sports	
18 Wheeler	—	1979	Midway	Sports	
18 Wheeler: American Pro Trucker	—	2000	Sega	Sports	
119	—	1986	Sega		
1941: Counter Attack	—	1990	Capcom	Scrolling shooter	
1942	—	1984	Capcom	Scrolling shooter	
1943 Kai	—	1987	Capcom	Scrolling shooter	
1943: The Battle of Midway	—	1987	Capcom	Scrolling shooter	
1944: The Loop Master	—	2000	Capcom	Scrolling shooter	
1945kIII	—	2000	Oriental	Scrolling shooter	
19th Hole	—	1986	Status Games	Sports	
19XX: The War Against Destiny	—	1995	Capcom	Scrolling shooter	
2 on 2 Open Ice Challenge	—	1995	Midway	Sports	
2020 Super Baseball	Super Baseball 2020^{NA}	1991	SNK; Pallas	Sports	
2Spicy	—	2007	Sega	Rail shooter	
3 Count Bout	Fire Suplex ^{JP}	1993	SNK	Sports	
3 Cushion Billiard	—	2000	ESD	Sports	
3-D Bowling	—	1978	Meadows	Sports	
3DDX	—	2000	NGG Entertainment	Dancing	
3x3 Puzzle	—	1998	Ace Enterprise	Puzzle	
4 in 1	—	1976	Meadows Games, Inc.	Multiplay	
4 en Raya	—	1990	IDSA	Tabletop	
4-in-1	—	1984	SMS Mfg.	Multiplay	
4-Card Bingo	—	1984	Cal Omega	Card game	
4-D Warriors	—	1985	Coreland; Sega	Scrolling shooter	
4-Player Bowling Alley	—	1979	Midway	Sports	
40-0	—	1984	Taito	Sports	
4nin-uchi Mahjong Jantotsu	—	1983	Sanritsu	Mahjong	
5-Aces Poker	—	198?		Casino	
500 GP	—	1999	Namco	Racing	
600	Turtles (US); Turpin (Sega license)	1981	Konami	Racing	
64th Street	—	1991	Jaleco	Beat 'em up	
7 Smash	—	1993	Sovic	Casino	
720°	—	1986	Atari Games	Sports	
7jigen no Youseitachi: Mahjong 7 Dimensions	—	1990	Dynax	Mahjong	
800 Fathoms	Mariner	1981	Amenip	Scrolling shooter	
9 Ball Shootout!	—	1993	E-Scape EnterMedia	Sports	
