= Nikon D2H =

2003 DX-format digital single-lens reflex camera

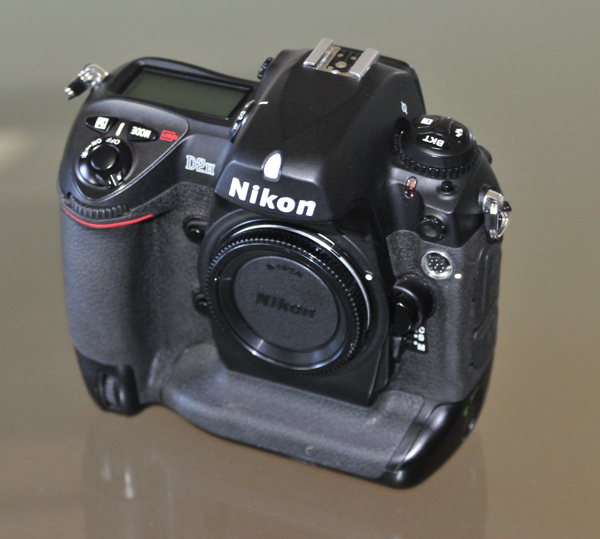

Overview
- Maker: Nikon
- Type: Digital single-lens reflex camera
- Released: 22 July 2003

Lens
- Lens: Interchangeable, Nikon F-mount

Sensor/medium
- Sensor: 23.3 mm × 15.5 mm JFET-LBCAST; 4.26 million total pixels, 1.5× Crop factor Nikon DX format
- Maximum resolution: 4.1 million pixels, L (2,464 × 1,632) / M (1,840 × 1,224)
- Film speed: ISO equivalency 200 to 1,600
- Storage media: CompactFlash Card (Type I/II) and Microdrive

Focusing
- Focus modes: Single Servo AF [S], Continuous Servo AF [C], Manual focus [M]
- Focus areas: 11-area AF system with 9 cross-type AF sensors

Exposure/metering
- Exposure modes: Programmed Auto (Flexible program possible) [P], Shutter-Priority Auto [S], Aperture-Priority Auto [A] and Manual [M]
- Exposure metering: 3D Color Matrix; EV 0-20 at ISO 100 equivalent with f/1.4 lens (EV 2-20 with Spot Metering)
- Metering modes: Center-Weighted and Spot

Flash
- Flash: i-TTL flash control

Shutter
- Shutter: Electromagnetically controlled vertical-travel focal-plane shutter
- Shutter speed range: 30 to 1/8,000 s and bulb, 1/250 s X-sync
- Continuous shooting: 8 frame/s, up to 40 JPEG, 35 TIFF or 26 RAW

Viewfinder
- Viewfinder: Optical-type fixed eye-level pentaprism, 100% frame coverage, 0.86× magnification

Image processing
- White balance: hybrid with 1,005-pixel CCD, LBCAST image sensor and external Ambience Light Sensor; Auto, Manual (6 steps with fine tuning), Preset (5 settings), Color temperature setting in kelvins (select from 31 steps)
- WB bracketing: 2 to 9 frames adjustable in 10, 20, 30 MIRED steps

General
- LCD screen: 2.5-in., 211,200-dot, low-temp. polysilicon TFT LCD with white LED backlighting
- Battery: Rechargeable Li-ion Battery EN-EL4 Photo
- Weight: Approx. 1,070 g (2.36 lb) without battery and storage media, 157.5 mm × 149.5 mm × 85.5 mm (6.2 in × 5.9 in × 3.4 in)
- Made in: Japan

The Nikon D2H is a professional-grade digital single-lens reflex camera introduced by Nikon Corporation on July 22, 2003. It uses Nikon's own JFET-LBCAST sensor with a 4.1-megapixel resolution, and is optimised for sports and action shooting that require a high frame rate. In 2005, the D2H was replaced by the D2Hs, which added new features derived from the 12-megapixel D2X digital SLR. The D2Hs was discontinued after the introduction of the D300 and D3 models.

Like most early Nikon Digital SLR cameras, it uses a "DX Format" sensor, which applies a crop factor compared to 35 mm film of approximately 1.5×.

== D2Hs ==
The D2Hs was announced on February 16, 2005, adding several improvements to the D2H design, although with the same sensor and body. Nikon added an improved light metering system, faster subject acquisition and tracking algorithms to the Multi-CAM-2000 Autofocus module, and expanded both the JPEG and RAW continuous shooting buffer.

Nikon also reported improved noise reduction at high sensor sensitivities. The ASIC image processing was changed to 12-bit from the original D2H 8-bit. Auto White Balance was altered with improved low color temperature lighting, mixed ambient, and speedlight lighting. Support for the sYCC color space was added, and Exif compliance was adjusted from Exif 2.2 to Exif 2.21, DCF 2.0, and DPOF.

GPS support and improved wireless support (with WT-2 transmitter for 802.11b/g) were also added. A new LCD screen of the same size but with increased resolution and a higher refresh rate was added to the body. The screen's playback mode now supports 15x zoom instead of the 8x of the D2H, with RGB Histogram.

The menus have been expanded to include an additional 5 languages for a total of 10. Like the D2X, it features a recent settings list, world time function, and modified vertical shooting buttons and CompactFlash card door opening.

The D2Hs features a continuous burst rate of up to 8 frames per second, with a buffer capacity of 50 JPEG files or 40 NEF (Nikon Electric Format- Nikon's proprietary Camera RAW image format) files. The 4.1 megapixel sensor has an ISO sensitivity equivalency of ISO 200–1600, in 1/3, 1/2, and 1 stop increments, as well as Hi-1 and Hi-2 ISO boosts (3200 and 6400 equivalency).

It offers full compatibility with AF-S, VR, DX, D and G type AF-Nikkor lenses, all functions except autofocus and some exposure modes with D-type Manual Focus Nikkors, with AI-P Nikkors all functions except 3D Color Matrix Metering II, 3D Multi-Sensor Balanced Fill-Flash and AF possible.

The D2Hs, like the D2X, offers compatibility with Non-CPU AI Nikkor lenses, which are usable in aperture-priority or manual exposure mode with Matrix-Metering, Center-Weighted and Spot metering available.

== Reaction to improvements over the D2H ==
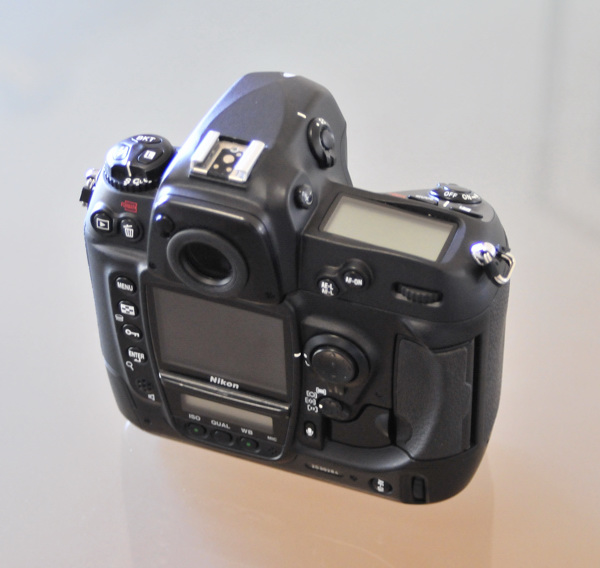
Nikon D2H rear view.

Although the D2Hs has been considered by some to be obsolete from its very introduction due to its relatively low 4.1 megapixel resolution, the D2Hs has a reputation for extremely high image quality and excellent detail rendition.

The D2Hs offers a noticeable improvement over the D2H in overall image quality and many users have reported that color rendition is improved in JPEG files (raw is the same), while the camera manages to offer a great improvement in noise at high sensitivities versus the D2H

== Infrared contamination ==
The D2H series has a relatively weak infrared (IR) filter, allowing infrared photography with the use of an IR bandpass filter, but contaminating regular images by causing certain dark-colored fabrics to take on a slight magenta color cast. Skin tones may also appear slightly ruddy. Use of a No. 486 digital UV/IR blocking filter can help resolve the problem with lenses that are at least 50 mm or longer. Lenses shorter than 50 mm are not recommended for use with a No. 486 filter due to a tendency for the corners of the image to take on a cyan color cast.

Sensor	Class	'01	'02	'03	'04	'05	'06	'07	'08	'09	'10	'11	'12	'13	'14	'15	'16	'17	'18	'19	'20	'21	'22	'23	'24	'25	'26
FX (Full-frame)	Flagship									D3X ^{−P}																	
FX (Full-frame)	Flagship								D3 ^{−P}		D3S ^{−P}		D4		D4S		D5^{T}					D6^{T}					
FX (Full-frame)	Professional									D700 ^{−P}			D800/D800E			D810/D810A			D850 ^{AT}								
FX (Full-frame)	Enthusiast														Df												
FX (Full-frame)	Enthusiast															D750 ^{A}					D780 ^{AT}						
FX (Full-frame)	Enthusiast													D600	D610												
DX (APS-C)	Flagship	D1X^{−E}				D2X^{−E}		D2Xs^{−E}																			
DX (APS-C)	Flagship	D1H ^{−E}			D2H^{−E}	D2Hs^{−E}																					
DX (APS-C)	Professional		D100^{−E}				D200^{−E}		D300^{−P}		D300S^{−P}						D500 ^{AT}										
DX (APS-C)	Enthusiast				D70^{−E}		D70s^{−E}	D80^{−E}		D90^{−E}		D7000 ^{−P}			D7100	D7200			D7500 ^{AT}								
DX (APS-C)	Upper-entry						D50^{−E}	D40X^{−E*}	D60^{−E*}		D5000^{A−P*}		D5100^{A−P*}	D5200^{A−P*}	D5300^{A*}	D5500^{AT*}		D5600 ^{AT*}									
DX (APS-C)	Entry-level							D40^{−E*}			D3000^{−E*}	D3100^{−P*}		D3200^{−P*}	D3300^{*}			D3400^{*}		D3500^{*}							
Early models		Nikon SVC (prototype; 1986); Nikon QV-1000C (1988); Nikon NASA F4 (1991); Nikon E2/E2S (1995); Nikon E2N/E2NS (1996); Nikon E3/E3S (1998); D1 (1999)																									
Sensor	Class																										
Sensor	Class	'01	'02	'03	'04	'05	'06	'07	'08	'09	'10	'11	'12	'13	'14	'15	'16	'17	'18	'19	'20	'21	'22	'23	'24	'25	'26
