= Nikon D2X =

2004 DX-format digital single-lens reflex camera

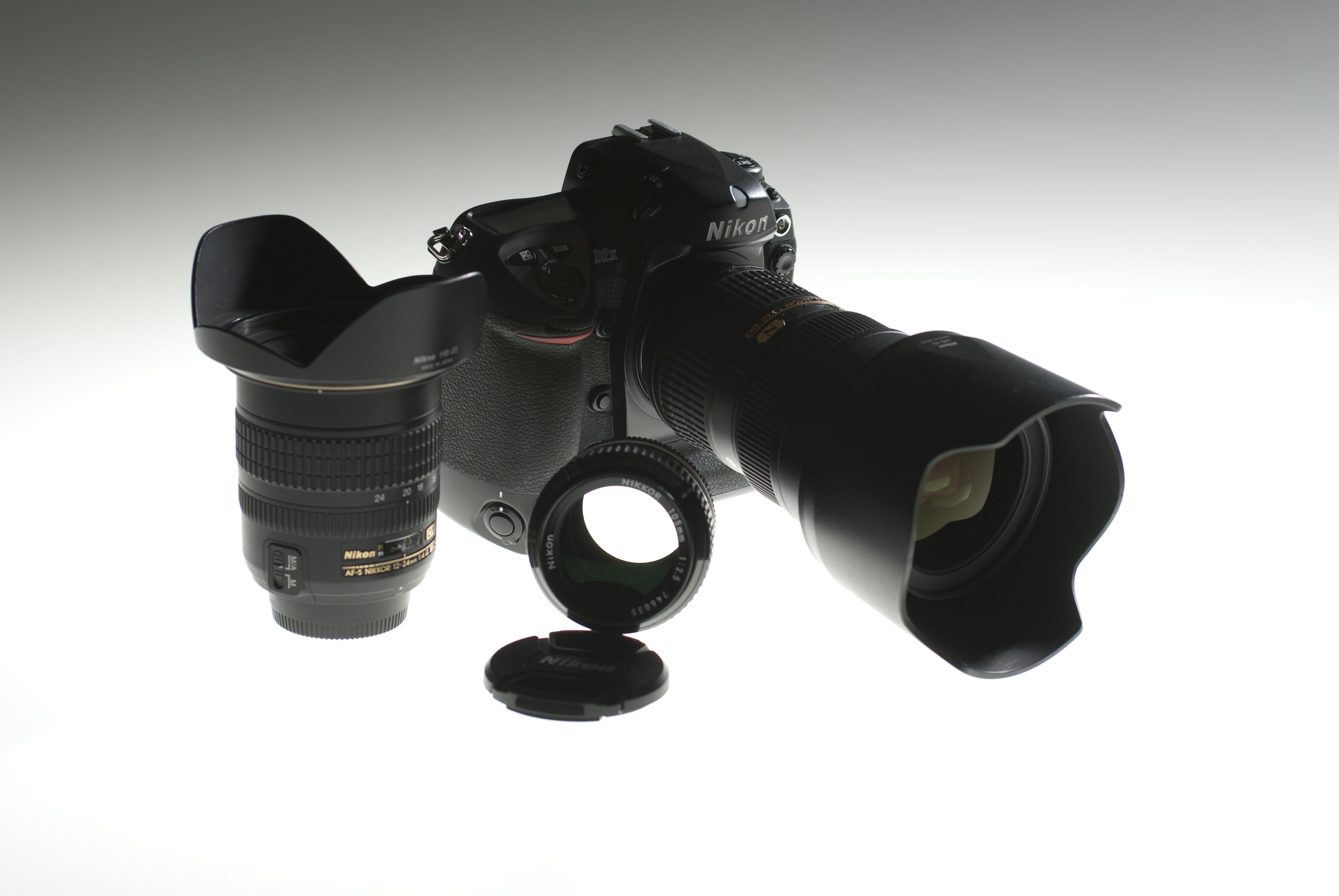

Overview
- Maker: Nikon
- Type: Digital single-lens reflex camera
- Released: September 2004

Lens
- Lens: Interchangeable, Nikon F-mount

Sensor/medium
- Sensor: 23.7 mm × 15.7 mm CMOS, DX format
- Maximum resolution: 4,288 × 2,848 (12.2 megapixels)
- Film speed: ISO equivalency 100 to 3200 in 1/3, 1/2 or 1.0 EV steps (100–800 only in auto-ISO mode)
- Storage media: CompactFlash (Type I or Type II)

Focusing
- Focus modes: Single Area AF, Dynamic AF with Focus Tracking and Lock-on, Closest Subject Priority, Group Dynamic AF
- Focus areas: 11 area TTL (High Speed Cropped: 9 focus areas)
- Focus bracketing: Eleven sets of focus brackets (area)

Exposure/metering
- Exposure modes: Program Auto [P], Shutter-Priority Auto [S], Aperture-Priority Auto [A], Manual [M]
- Exposure metering: TTL full-aperture exposure metering system
- Metering modes: 3D Color Matrix Metering II, Center-Weighted, Spot

Flash
- Flash: n/a
- Flash bracketing: n/a

Shutter
- Shutter: Electromagnetically controlled vertical-travel focal-plane shutter
- Shutter speed range: 30 to 1/8000 second and bulb
- Continuous shooting: 5 frame/s (RAW/JPEG Fine), 8 frame/s (RAW/JPEG Fine) in HS crop

Viewfinder
- Viewfinder: Optical-type fixed eye-level pentaprism

Image processing
- White balance: Auto, presets (5), manual, and color temperature in kelvins
- WB bracketing: 2 to 9 frames, 10,20,30 MIRED steps

General
- LCD screen: 2.5 in (64 mm), 230,000-d
- Battery: Lithium ion EN-EL4a
- Optional battery packs: AC adapter EH-6
- Weight: 1,070 g (2.36 lb) without batteries, 1,252 g (2.76 lb) with batteries
- Made in: Japan

The Nikon D2X is a 12.4-megapixel professional digital single-lens reflex camera (DSLR) that Nikon Corporation announced on September 16, 2004. The D2X was the high-resolution flagship in Nikon's DSLR line until June 2006 when it was supplanted by the D2Xs and, in time, the Nikon D3 range, Nikon D4 range, the Nikon D5 and the Nikon D6— the latter four using a FX full-format sensor.

== Technology ==
The D2X uses a DX-format CMOS sensor supplied by Sony instead of either a charge-coupled device or the Nikon proprietary LBCAST sensor which had both dominated Nikon's digital SLR lineup until the D2X. The camera supports the sYCC color space. The CMOS sensor used in the D2X has the ability to resolve about nine times more than the human eye. At 90 line pairs/millimeter (90 lp/mm), the sensor can resolve extremely fine detail. This makes the camera perform exceptionally well when used as a landscape or scenic imager, since it can better resolve smaller detail in distant objects.

The D2X surpasses the D2H and its successor the D2Hs by providing 5 frame/s at 12 megapixels, and 8 frames/second at 6.8 megapixels with its high-speed crop mode. In high-speed crop mode, the camera sacrifices pixels in favour of speed and crops the image to 50% of a 35 mm frame to enable continuous shooting at up to 8 frames per second (vs. 5 frame/s at full resolution).

It incorporates some other innovations such as refinements of the metering and autofocus systems. At the same time, the camera is able to make use of virtually all of Nikon's F-Mount lenses, including most legacy lenses. It has a rated shutter life of 200,000+ images, which is generally double or triple than less costly cameras.

It is one of very few cameras with a built-in "third-eye" which records the color of ambient light, giving the D2X an additional tool to accurately compute the white-balance for each image, instead of relying on calculations based only on subjects within the picture frame.

At the time of its release, the D2X had the highest concentration of pixels (pixel pitch) of any Nikon DSLR made to date. While its resolving capabilities are impressive, the very small resulting pixel size puts the camera at a disadvantage when working in low light by introducing slight noise in underexposed areas. The D2X has excellent noise reduction software built into the camera, so its images reflect the very high quality one would expect from an expensive digital SLR.

== Audience ==
The D2X was aimed at professional users. It replaced the D1X and complemented Nikon's D2Hs camera with which it shares a body. It was a very important model for Nikon given the 3½ years which had elapsed between the D1X and D2X, during which time competitive pressure mounted on the D1X.

== Competition ==
The principal competitive cameras for the D2X were the full-frame Canon EOS-1Ds Mark II and the Canon EOS-1D Mark II N. There was also some competitive overlap between the full-frame Canon EOS 5D and the D2Xs, although they were not direct competitors.

An unresolved debate rages about the respective technical compromises of the DX-format sensor and full frame sensors (100% of a 35 mm film frame) offered in competition with the D2X's DX format. Each format offers advantages and disadvantages which become more or less important in different usage settings (e.g. studio vs sport, indoor vs outdoor, wide angle vs telephoto). Nikon, convinced that the design characteristics of the DX format are best choice for its customers and target markets, had committed itself publicly to the DX-format sensor and its line of DX lenses is specifically designed for the smaller sensor. This philosophy remained until 2007, at which point Nikon's new generation of professional-level digital SLRs - the Nikon D3 and Nikon D700 - adopted a full-frame sensor.

Nikon's D2X was awarded best product accolades for 2005–6 by the European Imaging and Sound Association. Named European Professional Camera of the Year, the D2X's 'extraordinary performance' was praised by the judges.

== Nikon D2Xs ==
Nikon D2Xs is a digital single-lens reflex camera announced June 1, 2006, replacing the professional Nikon D2X.

Its improvements over the original D2X include:

- Automatic viewfinder masking in high-speed crop mode
- Increased buffer capacity to 60 frames in continuous shooting
- Additional ISO steps between 800 and 1600
- Improved metering for High Speed Crop
- More Autofocus options
- An AF system that can now detect focus at lower contrast and in lower light
- Higher capacity battery rated to 3,800 exposures per charge
- Improved Auto-ISO features
- Image verification
- Ability to save and load camera settings from a memory card
- 2.5 inch (64 mm) 230,000 pixel LCD with 170 degree viewing angle (same as D200)
- Menu look ported from the D200
- Black and White mode
- Additional color mode selections
- Locking USB connector
- Support for multiple custom curves
- A lockable recent settings menu
- Improved GPS data recording
- AF and VR mode recording in shooting data
- In-camera cropping

The original D2X gets the majority of these upgrades with a simple firmware update, with the exceptions of:

- Automatic viewfinder masking in High-Speed Crop mode
- 2.5 inch (64 mm) 230,000 pixel LCD with 170 degree viewing angle (the viewing angle is the area of improvement—size remains the same)

The larger capacity EN-EL4e is compatible with the original D2X and will give it the same improved battery life.

== Sample ==
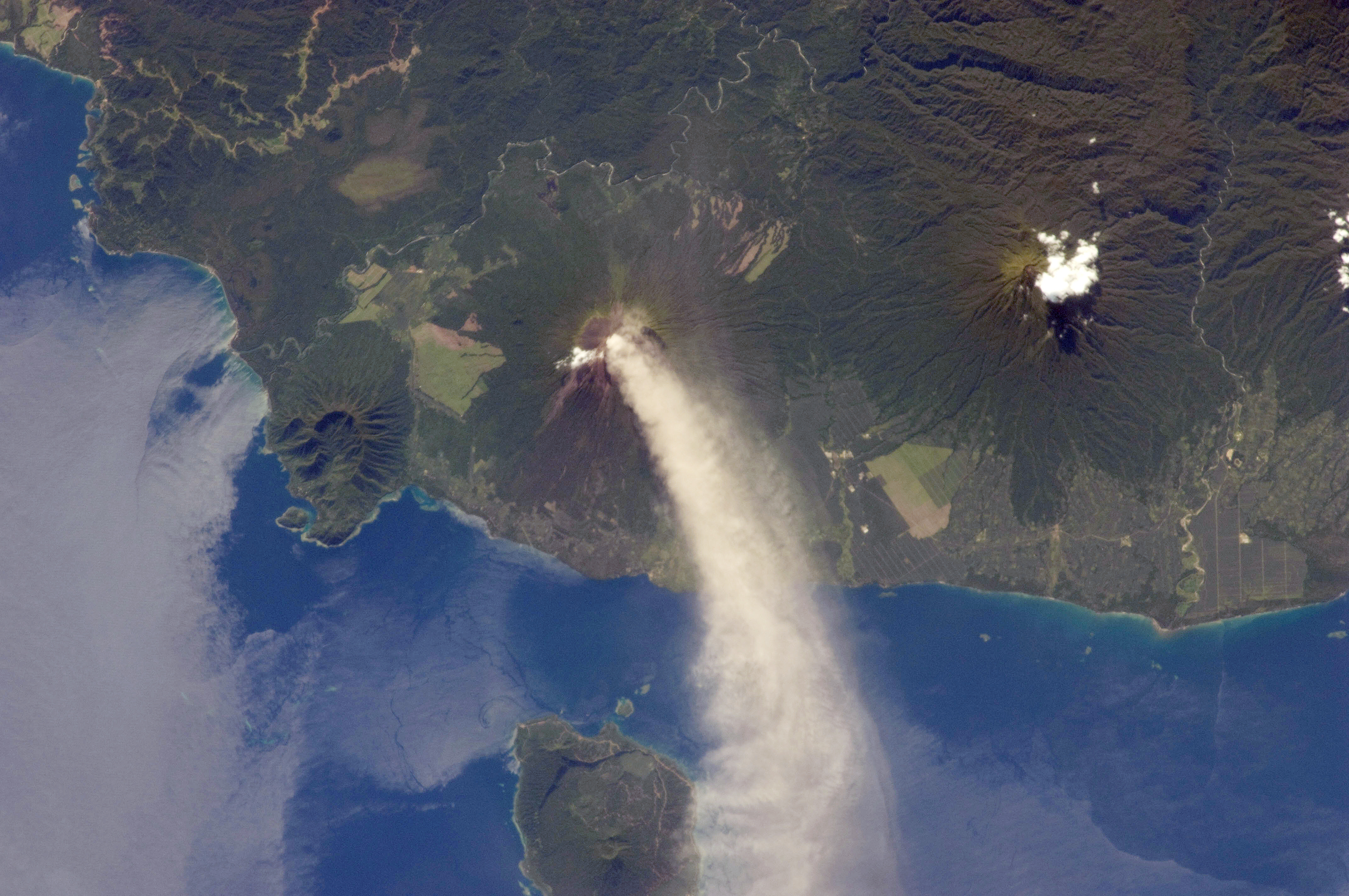
Nikon D2XS image from earth orbit

| Sensor | Class | '01 | '02 | '03 | '04 | '05 | '06 | '07 | '08 | '09 | '10 | '11 | '12 | '13 | '14 | '15 | '16 | '17 | '18 | '19 | '20 | '21 | '22 | '23 | '24 | '25 |
|---|---|---|---|---|---|---|---|---|---|---|---|---|---|---|---|---|---|---|---|---|---|---|---|---|---|---|
| FX (Full-frame) | Flagship | | | | | | | | | D3X ^{−P} | | | | | | | | | | | | | | | | |
| FX (Full-frame) | Flagship | | | | | | | | D3 ^{−P} | | D3S ^{−P} | | D4 | | D4S | | D5^{T} | | | | | D6^{T} | | | | |
| FX (Full-frame) | Professional | | | | | | | | | D700 ^{−P} | | | D800/D800E | | | D810/D810A | | | D850 ^{AT} | | | | | | | |
| FX (Full-frame) | Enthusiast | | | | | | | | | | | | | | Df | | | | | | | | | | | |
| FX (Full-frame) | Enthusiast | | | | | | | | | | | | | | | D750 ^{A} | | | | | D780 ^{AT} | | | | | |
| FX (Full-frame) | Enthusiast | | | | | | | | | | | | | D600 | D610 | | | | | | | | | | | |
| DX (APS-C) | Flagship | D1X^{−E} | | | | D2X^{−E} | | D2Xs^{−E} | | | | | | | | | | | | | | | | | | |
| DX (APS-C) | Flagship | D1H ^{−E} | | | D2H^{−E} | D2Hs^{−E} | | | | | | | | | | | | | | | | | | | | |
| DX (APS-C) | Professional | | D100^{−E} | | | | D200^{−E} | | D300^{−P} | | D300S^{−P} | | | | | | D500 ^{AT} | | | | | | | | | |
| DX (APS-C) | Enthusiast | | | | D70^{−E} | | D70s^{−E} | D80^{−E} | | D90^{−E} | | D7000 ^{−P} | | | D7100 | D7200 | | | D7500 ^{AT} | | | | | | | |
| DX (APS-C) | Upper-entry | | | | | | D50^{−E} | D40X^{−E*} | D60^{−E*} | | D5000^{A−P*} | | D5100^{A−P*} | D5200^{A−P*} | D5300^{A*} | D5500^{AT*} | | D5600 ^{AT*} | | | | | | | | |
| DX (APS-C) | Entry-level | | | | | | | D40^{−E*} | | | D3000^{−E*} | D3100^{−P*} | | D3200^{−P*} | D3300^{*} | | | D3400^{*} | | D3500^{*} | | | | | | |
| Early models | | Nikon SVC (prototype; 1986); Nikon QV-1000C (1988); Nikon NASA F4 (1991); Nikon E2/E2S (1995); Nikon E2N/E2NS (1996); Nikon E3/E3S (1998); D1 (1999) | | | | | | | | | | | | | | | | | | | | | | | | |
| Sensor | Class | | | | | | | | | | | | | | | | | | | | | | | | | |
| Sensor | Class | '01 | '02 | '03 | '04 | '05 | '06 | '07 | '08 | '09 | '10 | '11 | '12 | '13 | '14 | '15 | '16 | '17 | '18 | '19 | '20 | '21 | '22 | '23 | '24 | '25 |
