= DXS =

DXS may refer to:

- Department of External Services, a fictional U.S. intelligence agency on the TV show MacGyver
- Dexus, Australian stock exchange ticker symbol
- DXS, a web service component formerly known as Get Hot New Stuff in KDE Software Compilation 4
- Deep Extragalactic Survey, one of five components of the UKIRT Infrared Deep Sky Survey
- Diffuse X-ray Spectrometer, instrumentation on the NASA Space Shuttle mission STS-54
- DK X Seungkwan, K-pop duo also known as DxS
