= Bavarian D X =

Bavarian D X DRG Class 98.77
Type and origin
- Builder: Krauss, Munich
- Build date: 1890, 1893
- Total produced: 9
Specifications
- Configuration
  - Whyte: 0-6-2T
- Gauge: 1,435 mm (4 ft 8 1/2 in)
- Driver dia.: 985 or 1,006 mm (3 ft 2 3/4 in or 3 ft 3 5/8 in)
- Trailing dia.: 780 or 800 mm (2 ft 6 3/4 in or 2 ft 7 1/2 in)
- Length
  - Over beams: 9,310 mm (30 ft 6 1/2 in)
- Axle load: 11.0 t (10.8 long tons; 12.1 short tons)
- Adhesive weight: 33.0 t (32.5 long tons; 36.4 short tons)
- Service weight: 42.7 t (42.0 long tons; 47.1 short tons)
- Boiler pressure: 12 kgf/cm^{2} (1,180 kPa; 171 lbf/in^{2})
- Heating surface
  - Firebox: 1.40 m^{2} (15.1 sq ft)
  - Evaporative: 71.71 m^{2} (771.9 sq ft)
- Cylinders: 2
- Cylinder size: 390 mm (15 3/8 in)
- Piston stroke: 508 mm (20 in)
Performance figures
- Maximum speed: 45 km/h (28 mph)
- Indicated power: 300 PS (221 kW; 296 hp)
Career
- Numbers: K.Bay.Sts.E: 931–935, 99, 1961–1963; DRG 98 7701 – 98 7709
- Retired: 1925–1931

The Bavarian Class D X engines were saturated steam locomotives of the Royal Bavarian State Railways (Königlich Bayerische Staatsbahn).

The locomotives, which were built by Krauss were similar to the Class D VIII, but were smaller and lighter. Like the D VIII they had a trailing axle, that was connected to the final coupled axle by a Krauss-Helmholtz bogie.

In 1890 the first six were built, followed in 1893 by three more with somewhat larger wheels. The first engine was only 8,880 mm long due to the lack of a coal bunker on the driver's cab.

All the vehicles were taken over by the Deutsche Reichsbahn-Gesellschaft in 1925 as DRG Class 98.77 and remained in service until 1931. Only numbers 98 7706 and 98 7707 were retired shortly after the renumbering.

== See also ==
- Royal Bavarian State Railways
- List of Bavarian locomotives and railbuses
