= List of cameras on the International Space Station =

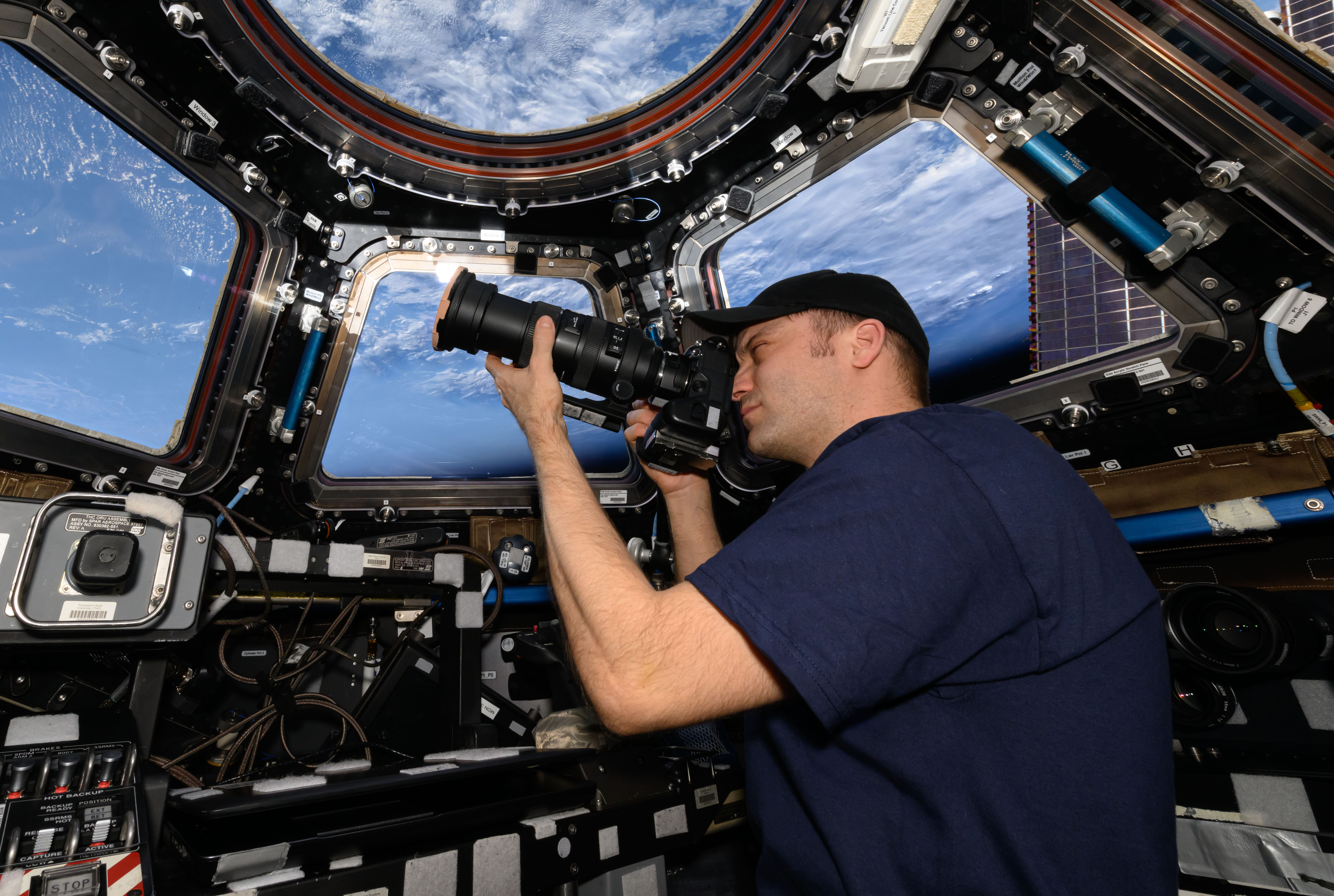
Matthew Dominick shooting with a Sigma 50-500mm f/4-6.3 DG lens on a Nikon Z9

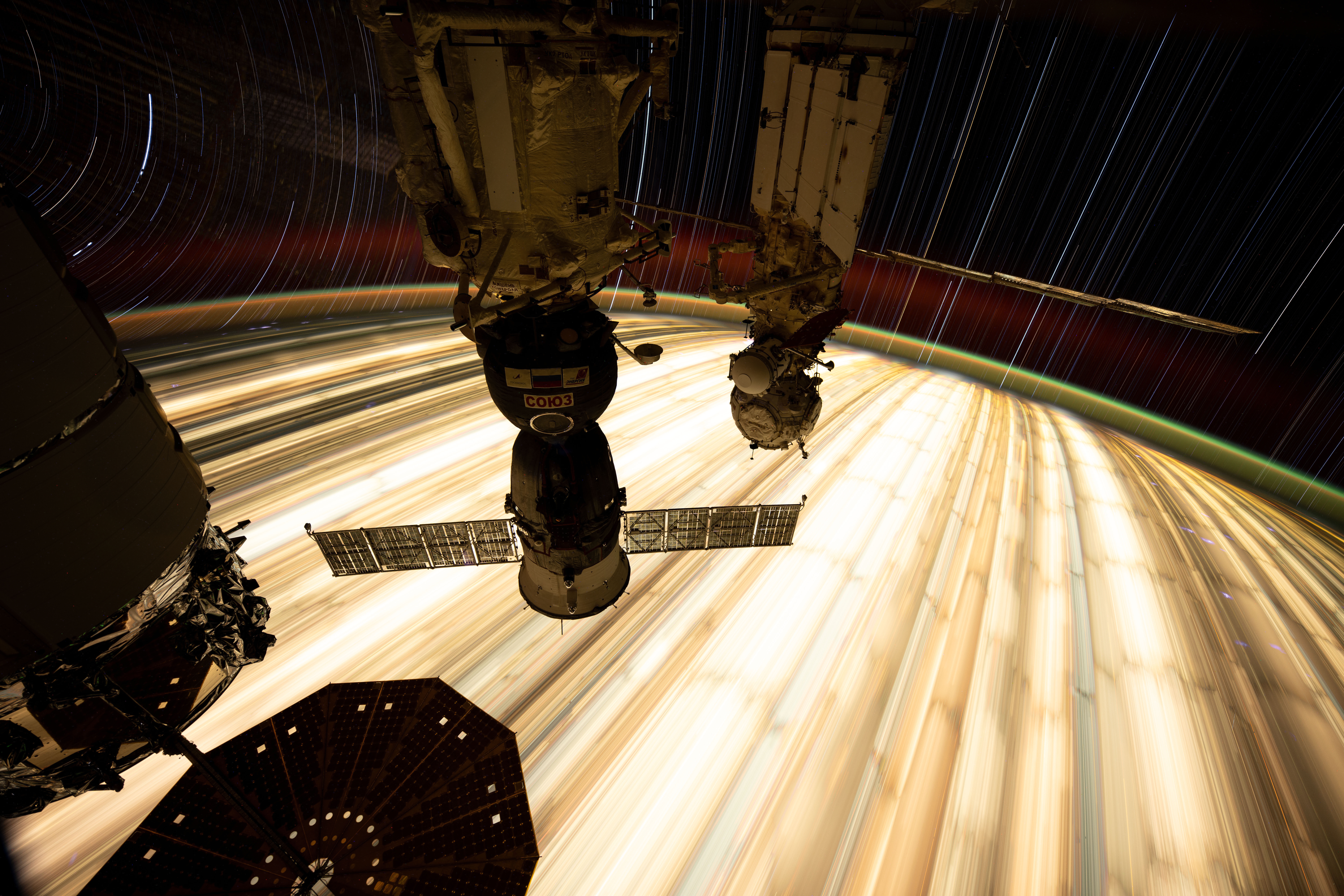
An example of digital photography by Donald Pettit on Expedition 72. It is a combination of multiple long exposure photos showing star and city light trails.

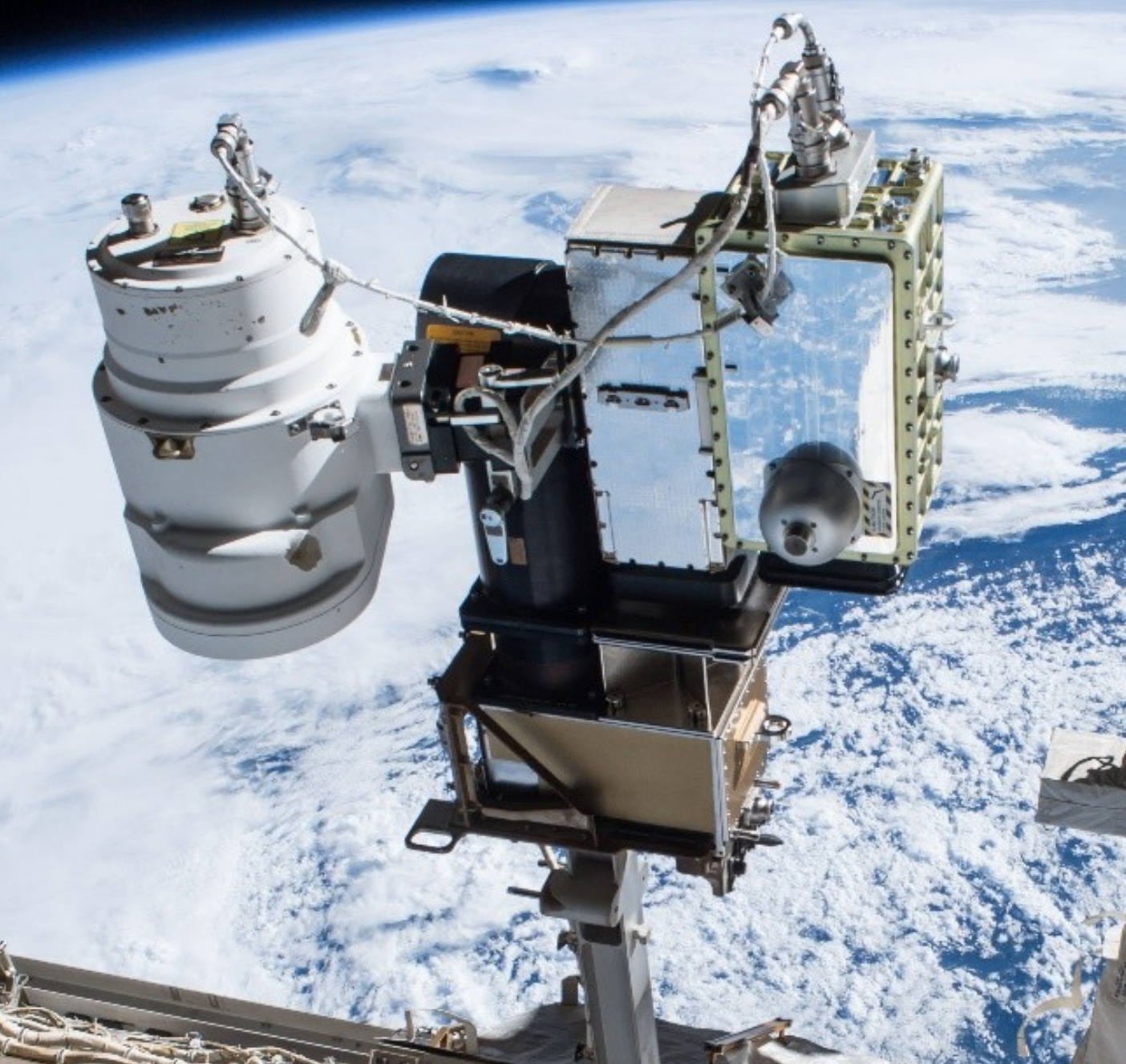
Some high definition cameras are mounted on standard definition cameras with pan/tilt mounts.

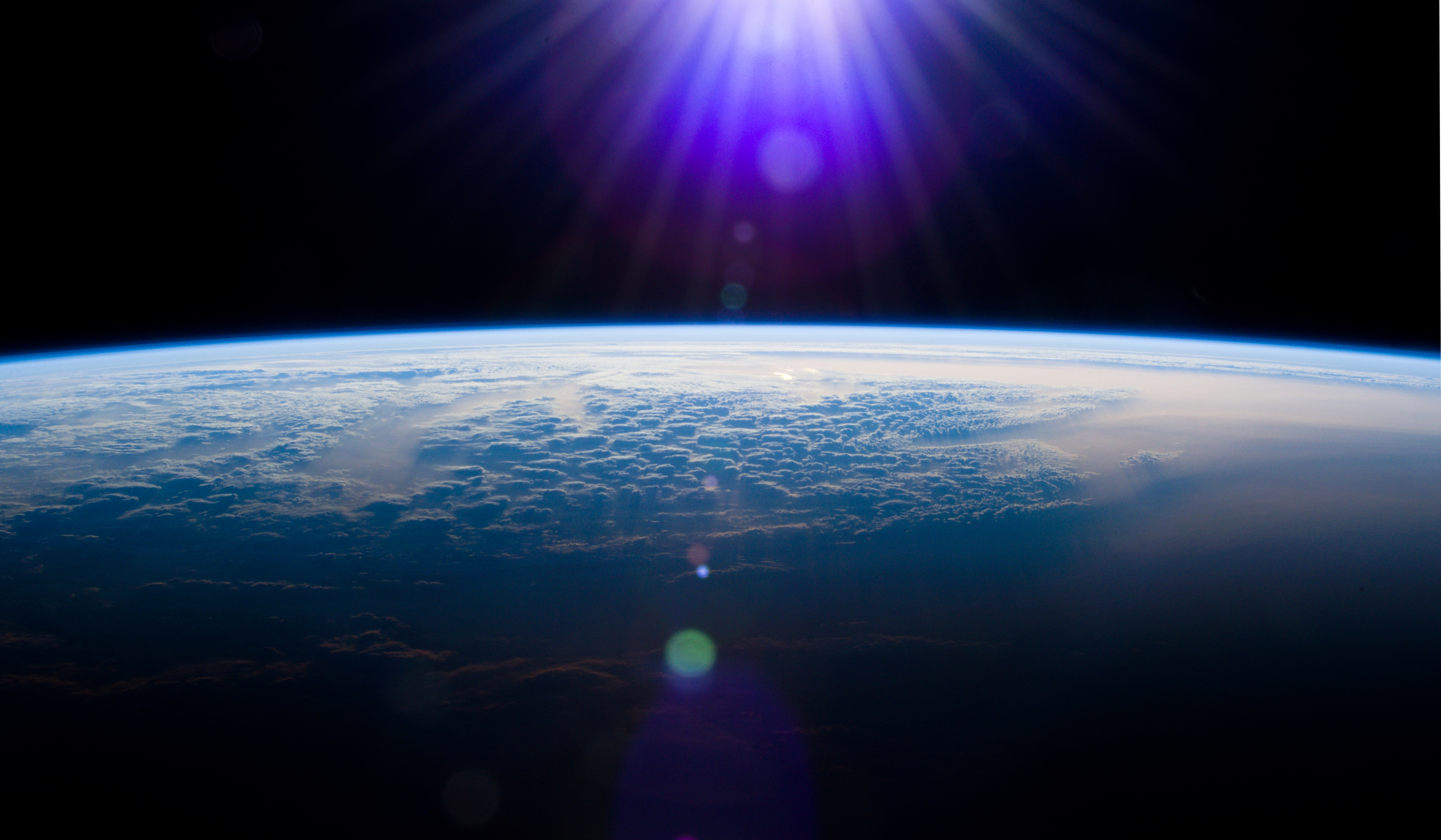
Image of a sunrise captured by an external high definition camera (EHDC)

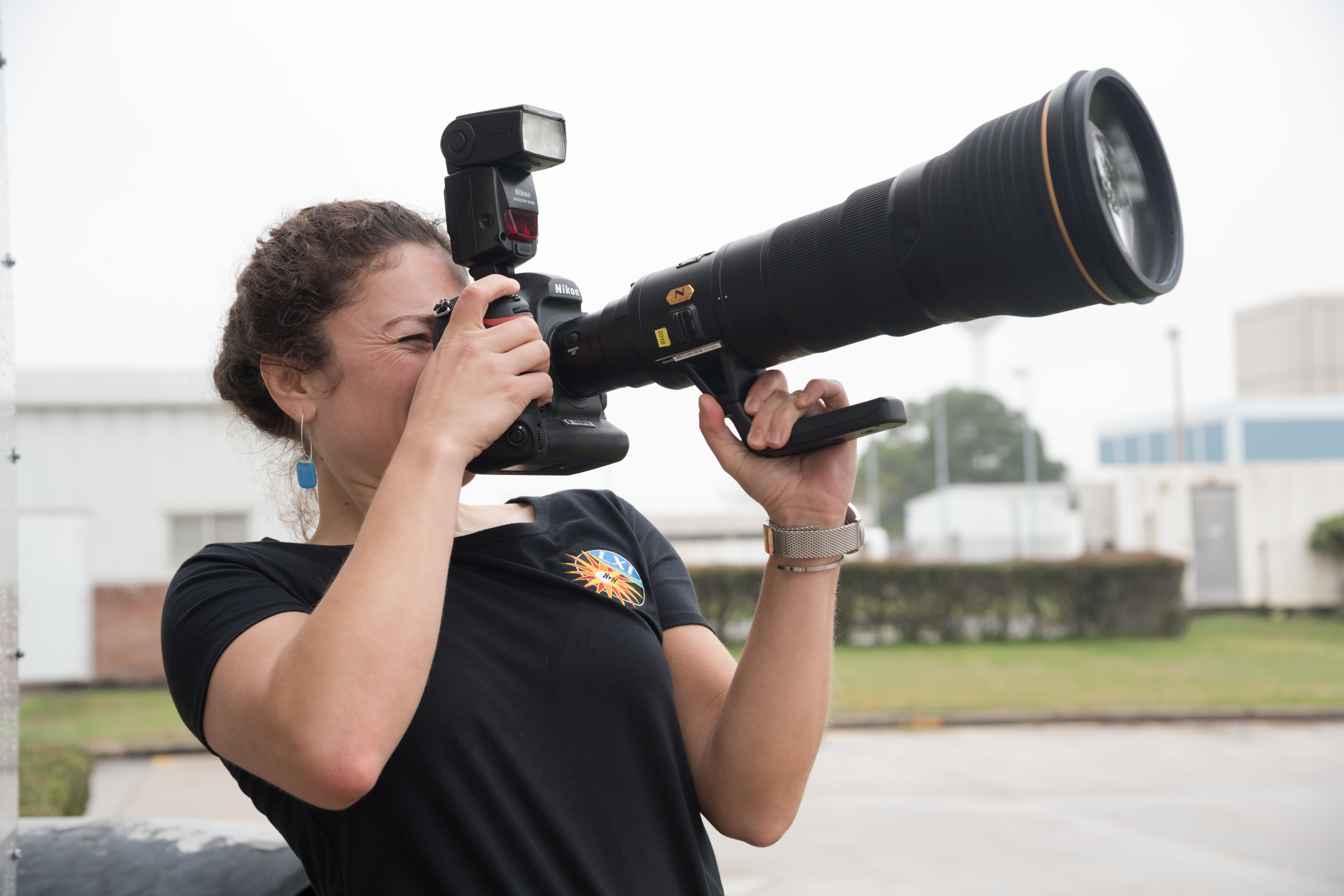
Astronaut Jessica Meir undergoing photography training.

The International Space Station has a large number of cameras, lenses, and other photography equipment on board.

== List of cameras on ISS ==
=== Currently used ===
Model	First use	Type	Video resolution	Description
Nikon Z9	2024	Full frame MILC	8K	Primary stills and video camera used by astronauts for various purposes.
Canon XF705	2021	Camcorder	720p	Hardwired to the station. Used to broadcast astronaut interviews, film science experiments, and by Mission Control Houston to visually monitor station activities.
iPad	2011	Tablet	4K	Various models used for many different purposes.
Nikon D5	2017	Full frame DSLR	1080p	Stills camera in a protective housing carried by astronauts during EVAs. Formerly the primary stills and video camera used by astronauts.
Nikon D4 / EHDC	2013	Full frame DSLR	720p	Remotely operated HD video/stills cameras with zoom lenses mounted on the exterior of the space station in a metal housing, some on a pan/tilt mount. Formerly the primary stills camera used by astronauts.
ETVCG	2000	CCD-TV	480i	Standard definition video-only CCD cameras mounted on the exterior of the space station with pan/tilt mounts.
SpaceTV-1	2024	Custom camera system	4K	Custom external payload by Sen corporation to livestream 4K video. Contains 3 pairs of cameras with different views from the front of the Columbus module. Streams one camera at a time.

=== Previously used ===
Model	First use	Type	Description
Kodak DCS760	2001	APS-H DSLR	Digital stills camera used by astronauts in the International Space Station
Nikon D1	2002	APS-C DSLR	First consumer digital Nikon camera brought to the station made entirely by Nikon.
Nikon D1X	2005	APS-C DSLR	Formerly the primary stills camera used by astronauts
Nikon D2Xs	2007	APS-C DSLR	Formerly the primary stills camera used by astronauts inside and during EVAs
Nikon D3	2009	Full frame DSLR	Formerly the primary stills camera used by astronauts.
Nikon D3X	2009	Full frame DSLR	Formerly the primary stills camera used by astronauts.
Nikon D3S	2010	Full frame DSLR	Formerly the primary stills camera used by astronauts.
Nikon D800E	2014	Full frame DSLR	Extra camera that was used alongside the D4. Special edition of the D800 to capture sharper images.
Nikon D850	2019	Full frame DSLR	Extra camera that was used alongside the D5. Had a higher resolution sensor.
Nikon D6	2022	Full frame DSLR	Secondary model of camera that was briefly used by astronauts.
RED EPIC-M DRAGON 6K	2015	Cinema	Cinema camera, used for science in the Space Station and to shoot ultra high definition video.
RED Helium 8K	2018	Cinema	Cinema camera, occasionally shot 8K video around the space station. Shot the first 8K video from the ISS.
Canon XF305	2010	Camcorder	Formerly hardwired to the station. Was used to broadcast astronaut interviews, film science experiments, and by mission control to visually monitor station activities

=== Camera payloads ===
Mission name	First light	End of mission	Description
Urthecast first generation	2014	2016	Two cameras used to image the Earth with one that images with a ground sample distance of 1 meter per pixel.
High Definition Earth Viewing experiment	2014	2019	Livestreamed from one of multiple cameras in 720p. Used to test the viability of using off the shelf consumer cameras in low Earth orbit.
Sony a7S II	2016	Unknown	External camera system on Kibo that shot 4K video with a Sony FE PZ 28-135mm F4 G OSS lens on a Sony a7S II mirrorless camera.
SpaceTV-1	2024	Future	Custom external payload by Sen corporation to livestream 4K video. Contains 3 pairs of cameras with different views from the front of the Columbus module. Streams one camera at a time.

== Camera equipment ==
Some of the modular lenses that are known to be used on the ISS include several Nikon F and 15 Nikon Z lenses, for cameras such as the D4 and Z9. This includes the Nikon 24-70mm f/2.8E ED VR, the Nikkor 600mm f/4G AF-S VR ED, the Nikon 800mm f/5.6E FL ED VR, and the Nikon AF-S FX TC-14E III 1.4x Teleconverter. 15 Nikon FTZ adapters are also used, allowing the F-mount lenses to be used on the Z9.

Camera equipment around the ISS

Various Nikon F- and Z-mount cameras and lenses stored around the Expedition 73 crew

A Canon XF705 camcorder, Nikon F- and Z-mount glass, teleconverters and mount adapters stored next to the Microgravity Science Glovebox

Nikon D4, D5, D850, Z9 and Nikkor F-mount lenses

Sophie Adenot using a Nikon Z9 with a Nikkor Z 400 mm f/2.8 TC VR S telephoto lens

== See also ==
- Int-Ball
- SPHERES
