= D6 =

D6, D.VI, D06 or D.6 may refer to:

== Science and technology ==
- ATC code D06, Antibiotics and chemotherapeutics for dermatological use, a chemical classification
- Cervical intraepithelial neoplasia, ICD-10 code D06, an abnormal growth of cells on the cervix
- d^{6}, a d electron count of a transition metal complex
- D_{6}, in mathematics, the dihedral group of order 6
- D6-DMSO or deuterated DMSO, a molecule containing six deuterium atoms
- D6 HDTV VTR, a high-definition digital video tape recorder
- Nikon D6, a 20.8 megapixel DSLR camera

== Transport and vehicles ==
=== Air ===
- Albatros D.VI, a 1917 German prototype single-seat twin-boom pusher biplane
- Auster D.6, a 1960 four-seat British light aircraft
- Bavarian D VI, an 1880 German saturated steam locomotive
- Dunne D.6, a British Dunne aircraft
- Fokker D.VI, a 1917 German fighter aircraft
- LFG Roland D.VI, a 1918 German fighter aircraft
- Interair South Africa, IATA code D6, an airline based in Johannesburg, South Africa

=== Land ===
- Caterpillar D6, a 1956 medium bulldozer
- D-6 (Д-6), codename for the Moscow Metro 2
- D6 road (Croatia), a state road in Croatia
- D6 motorway (Czech Republic)
- London Buses route D6, a Transport for London contracted bus route
- PRR D6, an 1881 American steam locomotive model

=== Sea ===
- HMS Hampshire (D06), a 1961 British Royal Navy County-class destroyer
- HMS Keith (D06), a British B-class destroyer built around 1930

== Other uses ==
- d6, in gaming, a six-sided die
  - D6 System, a proprietary role-playing game system
- Dublin 6, a postal district used by Ireland's postal service
- Hohner D6 Clavinet, an electrophonic keyboard instrument

== See also ==
- 6D (disambiguation)
- DVI (disambiguation)
