= Nikon D500 =

Digital single-lens reflex camera

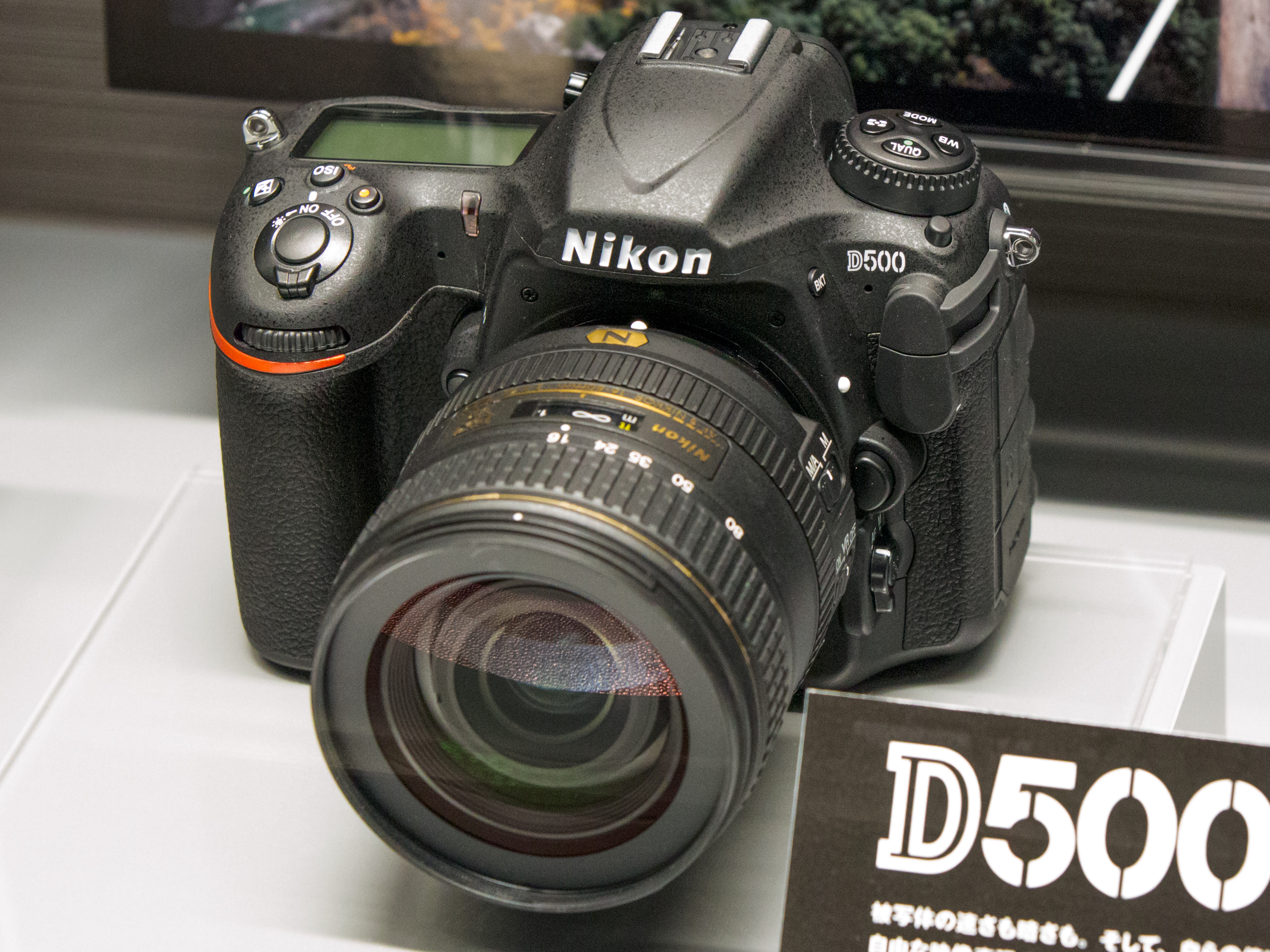

Overview
- Maker: Nikon
- Type: Digital single-lens reflex

Lens
- Lens: Interchangeable, Nikon F-mount

Sensor/medium
- Sensor: Nikon DX format, 23.5 mm x 15.7 mm CMOS; 4.2 μm pixel size
- Sensor maker: Sony
- Maximum resolution: 5,568 × 3,712 (20.9 M pixels sensor)
- Film speed: 100–51,200 in 1, 1/2 or 1/3 EV steps (down to 50 and up to 1,640,000 as expansion)
- Recording medium: SD/SDHC/SDXC (UHS-II), XQD and CFExpress (Type B)

Focusing
- Focus modes: Instant single-servo AF (S), continuous-servo AF (C), manual (M)
- Focus areas: 153 points, 99 cross-type sensors User-selectable: 55 points, 35 cross-type

Exposure/metering
- Exposure modes: Programmed Auto [P] with flexible program; Shutter-Priority Auto [S]; Aperture Priority Auto [A]; Manual [M]
- Exposure metering: Three-mode through-the-lens (TTL) exposure metering

Flash
- Flash: External

Shutter
- Shutter: Electronically controlled vertical-travel focal plane shutter
- Shutter speed range: 30 s – 1/8000 s, bulb
- Continuous shooting: 10 frame/s, up to 200 frames (RAW)

Viewfinder
- Viewfinder: Optical, 100% frame coverage

Image processing
- Image processor: EXPEED 5

General
- Video recording: 4K up to 30 fps 1080p up to 60 fps
- LCD screen: 3.2-inch tilting TFT LCD with 2,359,000 dots with touchscreen
- Battery: EN-EL15
- Optional battery packs: MB-D17 battery pack
- Weight: 860 g (30 oz) (1.90 lb) with battery and memory card 760 g (1.68 lb) body only
- Latest firmware: 1.40 / 17 December 2024; 21 months ago
- Made in: Thailand

Chronology
- Predecessor: Nikon D300S

The Nikon D500 is a 20.9-megapixel professional digital single-lens reflex camera with an APS-C sensor. It was announced by Nikon Corporation on January 6, 2016 along with the Nikon D5 full frame camera. D500 replaced the D300S as Nikon's DX format flagship DSLR. On February 23, 2017, at CP+ show, a special edition was released for Nikon's 100th anniversary. The D500 jointly won a Camera Grand Prix Japan 2017 Editors Award. The camera was discontinued on February 1, 2022.

== Features ==
- 4K UHD video in 30p, 25p, and 24p
- Nikon EXPEED 5 image/video processor
- Magnesium alloy and carbon fiber weather-sealed body
- Active D-Lighting (three levels)
- Retouch menu includes filter type, hue, crop, D-lighting, Mono (Black and White, Cyanotype or Sepia)
- Multi-CAM 20K autofocus module with 153 sensors in normal mode with 99 cross-type sensors. Of these points, 15 will work with any lens/teleconverter combination with a maximum aperture of f/8 or larger.
  - Of the 153 points, 55 are user-selectable; 35 of those points are cross-type, and 9 will work down to f/8.
- Focus points' low-light performance: -4EV (central focus point) and -3EV (other 152 focus points)
- Auto AF fine-tune achieves focus tuning in live view through automatic setting of adjustment value with a few button operations.
- Live View Mode
- Built-in sensor cleaning (using ultrasound) helps to remove the dust from sensor
- 10-pin remote and flash sync terminals on camera
- File formats include JPEG, TIFF, NEF (Nikon's raw image format compressed and uncompressed), and JPEG+NEF (JPEG size/quality selectable)
- Dual memory card slots (one SD and one XQD). The SD slot is the first in any Nikon camera to support the UHS-II bus. As of "C" firmware update 1.30 support has been added for CFexpress cards (Type B) in the XQD slot.
- The D500 can be set to automatically delay its shutter release to compensate for flickering electric lighting. It is the first Nikon camera to include this feature, which was initially absent from the professional D5 announced on the same date. This feature was added to the D5 via a June 2016 firmware update.

With the camera's initial firmware version Wi-Fi only worked with Nikon's proprietary "SnapBridge" app, this also applies other Nikon models. In May 2019, a firmware update opened up the Wi-Fi to third party applications.

Sensor	Class	1999	2000	2001	2002	2003	2004	2005	2006	2007	2008	2009	2010	2011	2012	2013	2014	2015	2016	2017	2018	2019	2020	2021	2022	2023	2024	2025	2026
FX (Full-frame)	Flagship											D3X ^{−P}																	
FX (Full-frame)	Flagship										D3 ^{−P}		D3S ^{−P}		D4		D4S		D5^{T}					D6^{T}					
FX (Full-frame)	Professional											D700 ^{−P}			D800/D800E			D810/D810A			D850 ^{AT}								
FX (Full-frame)	Enthusiast																Df												
FX (Full-frame)	Enthusiast																	D750 ^{A}					D780 ^{AT}						
FX (Full-frame)	Enthusiast															D600	D610												
DX (APS-C)	Flagship		D1^{−E}	D1X^{−E}				D2X^{−E}		D2Xs^{−E}																			
DX (APS-C)	Flagship		D1^{−E}	D1H ^{−E}			D2H^{−E}	D2Hs^{−E}																					
DX (APS-C)	Professional				D100^{−E}				D200^{−E}		D300^{−P}		D300S^{−P}						D500 ^{AT}										
DX (APS-C)	Enthusiast						D70^{−E}		D70s^{−E}	D80^{−E}		D90^{−E}		D7000 ^{−P}			D7100	D7200			D7500 ^{AT}								
DX (APS-C)	Upper-entry								D50^{−E}	D40X^{−E*}	D60^{−E*}		D5000^{A−P*}		D5100^{A−P*}	D5200^{A−P*}	D5300^{A*}	D5500^{AT*}		D5600 ^{AT*}									
DX (APS-C)	Entry-level									D40^{−E*}			D3000^{−E*}	D3100^{−P*}		D3200^{−P*}	D3300^{*}			D3400^{*}		D3500^{*}							
Early models		SVC (prototype; 1986); QV-1000C (1988); NASA F4 (1991); E2/E2S (1995); E2N/E2NS (1996); E3/E3S (1998)																											
Sensor	Class																												
Sensor	Class	1999	2000	2001	2002	2003	2004	2005	2006	2007	2008	2009	2010	2011	2012	2013	2014	2015	2016	2017	2018	2019	2020	2021	2022	2023	2024	2025	2026
