= Sixpence =

Sixpence may refer to:

== Currency ==
Worth six pence: 1/40 of a pound or half a shilling

- Sixpence (Australian coin)
- Sixpence (British coin)
- Sixpence (Irish coin)
- Sixpence (New Zealand coin)

== Other uses ==
- Flat cap, a rounded cap with a brim, also called a sixpence
- Sixpence (horse) (foaled 2021), a Japanese thoroughbred racehorse
- Collin Sixpence (born 1974), Zimbabwean sculptor
- Syd Sixpence, a 1982 children's book by Australian author Joan Lindsay

== See also ==
- 6D (disambiguation)
- Pence (disambiguation)
- Penny (disambiguation)
