= Pence (disambiguation) =

Pence is a plural of penny, a coin or unit of currency.

Pence may also refer to:

== Places in the United States ==
- Pence, Alabama, an unincorporated community
- Pence, Indiana, an unincorporated community
- Pence, Kansas, an unincorporated community
- Pence, Lewis County, Kentucky, an unincorporated community
- Pence, Wolfe County, Kentucky, an unincorporated community
- Pence, Wisconsin, a town
  - Pence (CDP), Wisconsin, a census-designated place within the town

== People ==
- Pence (surname), a list of people
  - Mike Pence (born 1959), 48th vice president of the United States from 2017 to 2021
- Pence Dacus (1931–2019), American football player and coach

== Other uses ==
- Pence (Kingdom Hearts), a video game character
- Pence Opera House, an opera house and later, a mission

== See also ==
- Peter's Pence, a practice in the Roman Catholic Church
- Penny (disambiguation), including that of "pennies"
- Pense (disambiguation)
