= 6D =

6D, 6d, or 6-D may refer to:

- Canon EOS 6D, a digital SLR camera
- Jamaica 6d abolition of slavery postage stamp, a 1921 stamp issue
- Six-dimensional space, any space that has six dimensions
- 6D, the production code for the 1983 Doctor Who serial Snakedance
- Sixpence (British coin), often shortened to "6d."

== Aircraft ==
- Boeing Model 6D, an American biplane flying-boat
- B-6D, a model of Xian H-6
- Grumman KA-6D, a model of Grumman A-6 Intruder
- F-6D Mustang, a model of North American P-51 Mustang
- North American AT-6D Texan, a model of North American T-6 Texan
- OH-6D, a model of Hughes OH-6 Cayuse
- XP-6D, a model of Curtiss P-6 Hawk

== See also ==
- Sixpence (disambiguation)
- D6 (disambiguation)
