= CFexpress =

Memory card format

- Media type: Memory card
- Standard: CFexpress standard
- Developed by: CompactFlash Association
- Dimensions: Type A 20.0×28.0×2.8 mm (0.79×1.10×0.11 in) Type B 38.5×29.8×3.8 mm (1.52×1.17×0.15 in) Type C 54.0×74.0×4.8 mm (2.13×2.91×0.19 in)
- Extended from: XQD card
- Released: 2017

CFexpress is a standard for removable media cards by the CompactFlash Association (CFA) most used in digital cameras. The standard uses the NVM Express protocol over a PCIe interface. 3 different form factors are available, with 1 to 4 PCI-E lanes available.

== History ==
=== CFexpress versions ===
The CFexpress standard was first announced by the CompactFlash Association on 7 September 2016, with its specifications based on the PCI Express interface and NVM Express protocol.

The first version of the specification (CFexpress 1.0) was published on 18 April 2017. The first iteration of cards (Type B) used the XQD form-factor, being the same in size (38.5 mm × 29.8 mm × 3.8 mm) as well as having the same physical connector and PCIe 3.0 interface, but having two instead of one PCIe lane for speeds up to 2 GB/s (XQD: 1 GB/s). NVMe 1.2 is used for low-latency access, low overhead and highly parallel access.

The CFexpress 2.0 standard was announced on 28 February 2019. It featured two new card formats - a more compact Type A with one lane, and a larger Type C with four lanes. Existing cards were designated as Type B. The NVM Express protocol was upgraded to 1.3.

The CFexpress 4.0 standard was announced on 28 August 2023. CFexpress 4.0 supports up to four PCIe 4.0 lanes, at 2 GB/s per lane - twice as fast as CFexpress 2.0. The NVM Express protocol was upgraded to 1.4c.

=== Products ===
The standard itself is included in a variety of digital cameras, memory cards and memory card readers.

The first memory card using the CFexpress standard was introduced by Delkin on 13 June 2017 and were based on the CFexpress 1.0 specification.

The first consumer camera was announced by Nikon on 23 August 2018. Nikon announced their new mirrorless cameras, the Z6 and Z7, both using a single slot for either a CFexpress Type B or an XQD card. At launch the cameras only supported XQD cards, but added support for CFexpress cards with a firmware update. The firmware update was released on 16 December 2019 (firmware version 2.20) adding support for CFExpress over a year after the cameras' launch. On 13 February 2019, Nikon further confirmed that CFexpress support would also be added via a firmware update to the D5, D500 and D850 where a CFexpress Type B card could be used in the camera's XQD slot. All three cameras were announced before (D5 and D500: January 2016) or right after (D850: August 2017) the CFexpress standard was published, making this addition a rather unusual tech upgrade for older hardware in the industry.

Other companies followed with cameras supporting CFexpress cards in the following years:

- Phase One — XF IQ4 series, 2018, CFexpress support added in later firmware update
- Canon — EOS-1D X Mark III, 2019, using dual CFexpress slots with no option for using non-CFexpress cards
- Sony — α7S III, 2020, using dual CFexpress Type A and SD cards
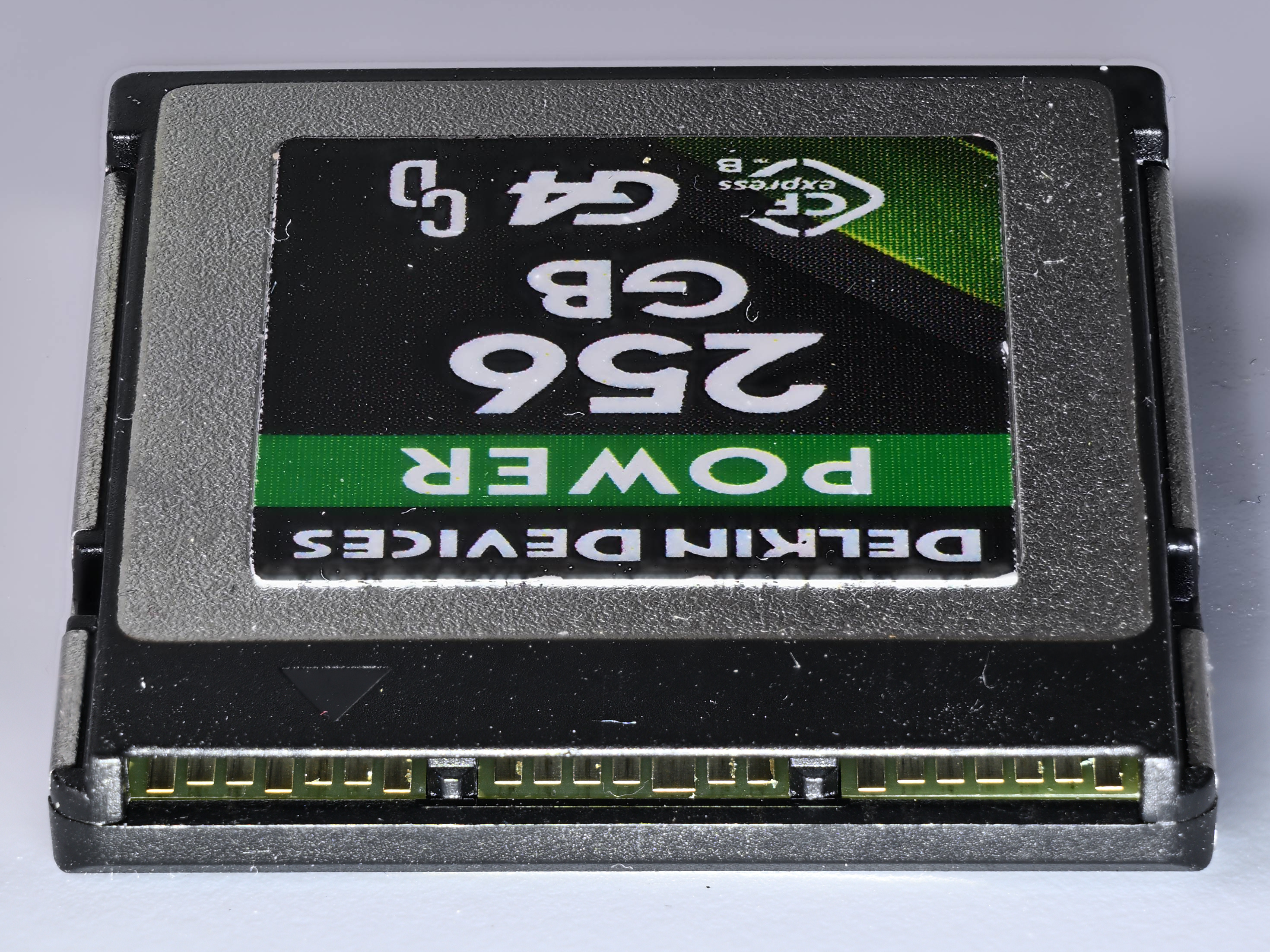
A CFexpress by Delkin

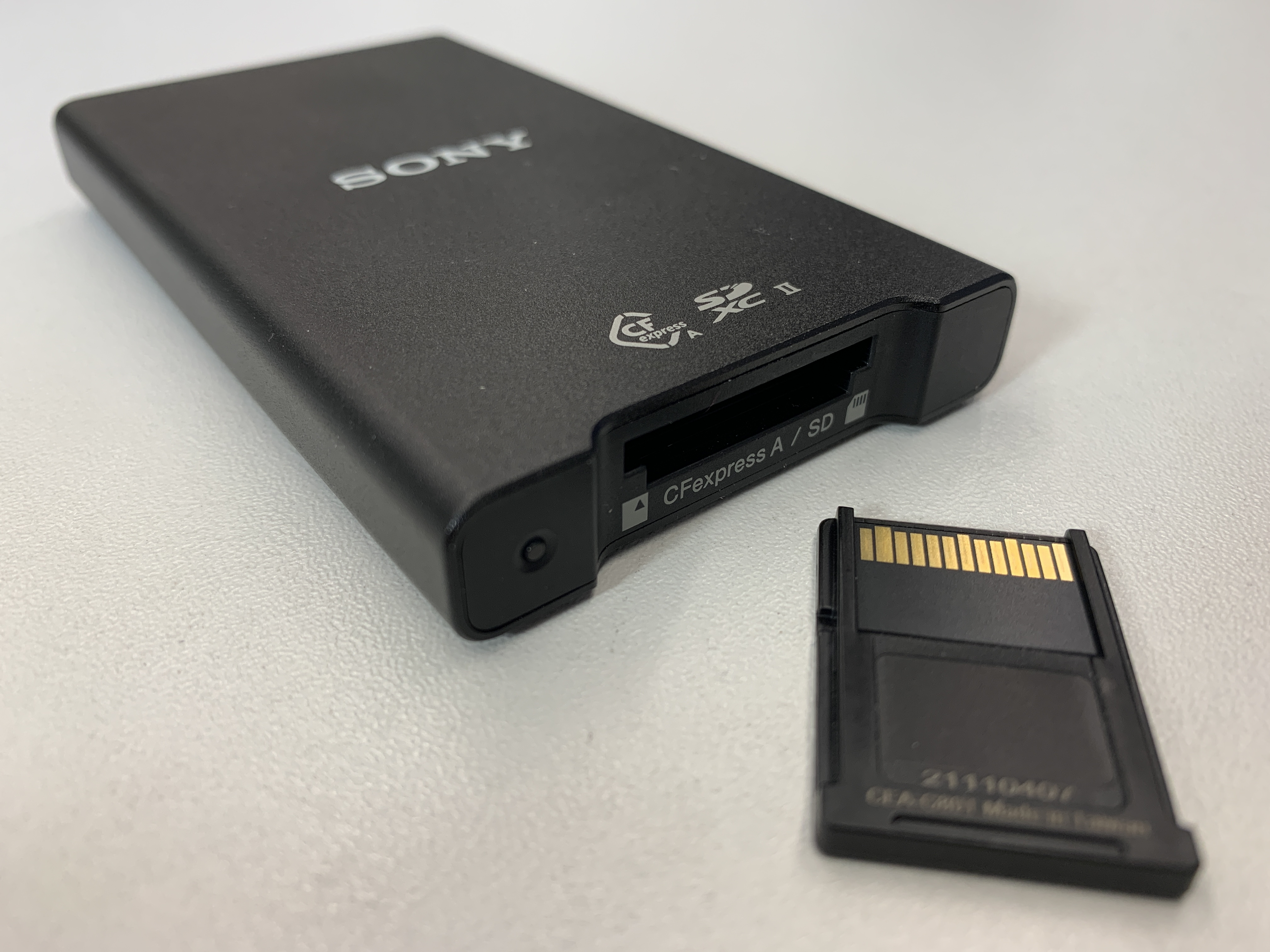
A Sony CFexpress Type A reader and card

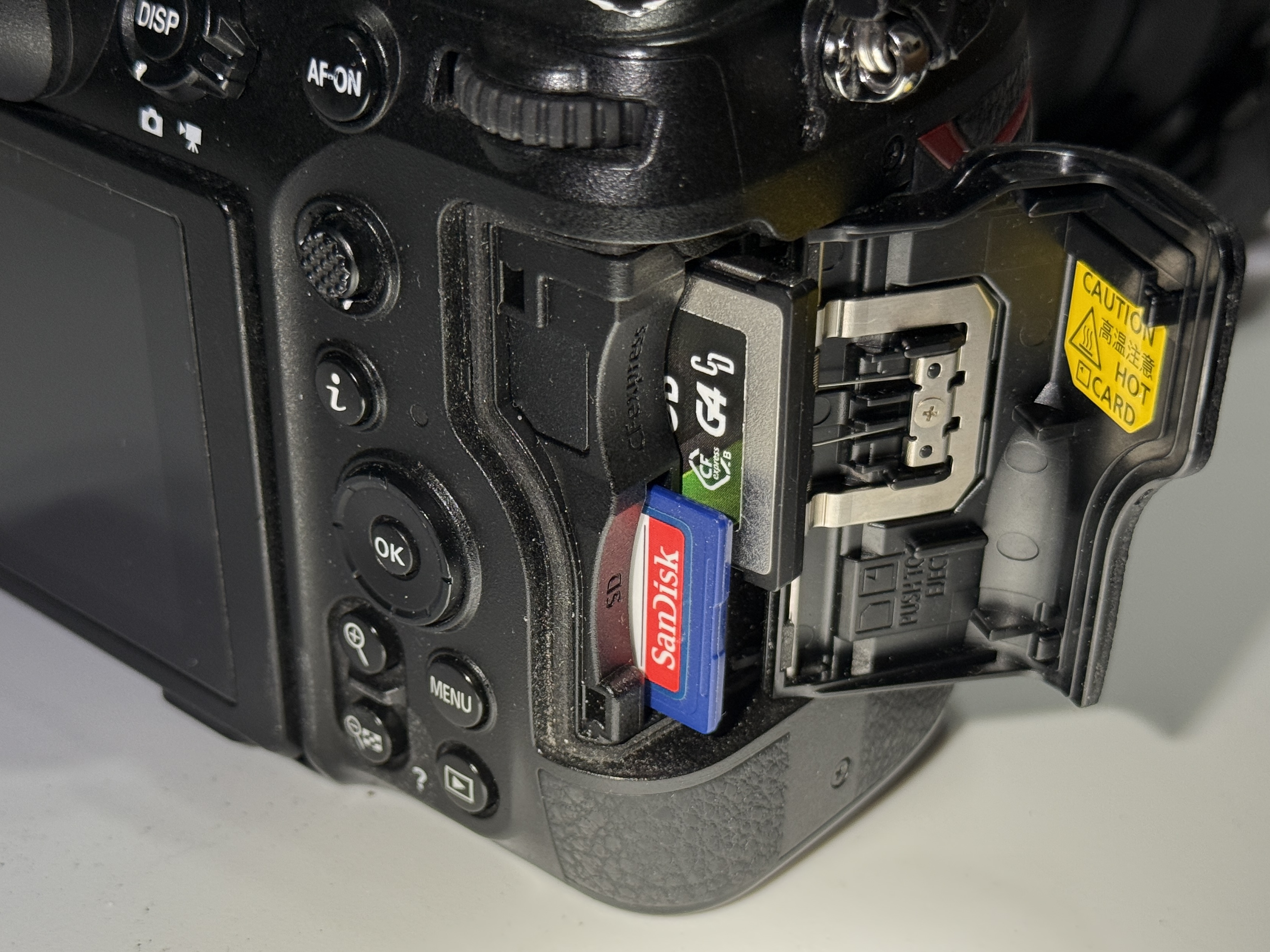
CFexpress Type B and SD slots on a Nikon Z8 camera

== Derivatives ==
The CFexpress card standard was also used to adapt it to other products that are not compatible with other photographic equipment.
On November 10, 2020, Microsoft launched the Xbox Series X and Series S with a slot for semi-proprietary Expansion Cards based on a CFexpress Type B form factor. These Cards only support PCIe Gen4.

== Comparison ==
Standard	Version	Launched	Bus	Speed (full-duplex)
CFexpress	1.0	2017 Q2	PCIe 3.0 x2	2.0 GB/s
CFexpress	2.0	2019 Q1	PCIe 3.0 x1; PCIe 3.0 x2; PCIe 3.0 x4	1.0 GB/s (Type A); 2.0 GB/s (Type B); 4.0 GB/s (Type C)
CFexpress	4.0	2023 Q3	PCIe 4.0 x1; PCIe 4.0 x2; PCIe 4.0 x4	2.0 GB/s (Type A); 4.0 GB/s (Type B); 8.0 GB/s (Type C)
SD	3.0	2010 Q2	UHS-I	0.1 GB/s
SD	4.0	2011 Q1	UHS-II	0.3 GB/s
SD	6.0	2017 Q1	UHS-III	0.6 GB/s
SD	7.0	2018 Q2	PCIe 3.0 x1	1.0 GB/s
SD	8.0	2020 Q2	PCIe 4.0 x2	4.0 GB/s
UFS Card	1.0	2016 Q2	UFS 2.0	0.6 GB/s
UFS Card	2.0	2018 Q4	UFS 3.0	1.2 GB/s
CFast	1.0	2008 Q3	SATA-300	0.3 GB/s
CFast	2.0	2012 Q3	SATA-600	0.6 GB/s
XQD	1.0	2011 Q4	PCIe 2.0 x1	0.5 GB/s
XQD	2.0	2014 Q1	PCIe 2.0 x2	1.0 GB/s

== Form factors ==
CFexpress supports the following card sizes.

Form Factor	Dimensions (mm)	PCIe Lanes
A	20.0 × 28.0 × 2.8	1
B	38.5 × 29.8 × 3.8	2
C	54.0 × 74.0 × 4.8	4

The larger form factors have more electrical contacts, allowing more PCIe lanes to be used.

Type A is similar in size to an SD card. As of 2023, Sony is the only camera manufacturer that has adopted CFexpress Type A, using it in some of its Sony α and FX cameras. All Sony CFexpress slots also support UHS-II SD cards.

Type B is the most popular CFexpress form factor, and is used by several camera manufacturers, including Canon, DJI, Nikon, Panasonic, and Red. It has the same size and contacts as an XQD card, allowing a single card slot to accept both XQD and CFexpress Type B cards. Some older cameras with XQD slots have received firmware updates to allow use of a CFexpress Type B card in its XQD slot. As CFexpress uses the NVM Express protocol, adapters are available to convert M.2 2230 format solid-state drives into CFexpress Type B cards.

As of 2023, no devices have implemented CFexpress Type C, and neither cards nor cameras are available.

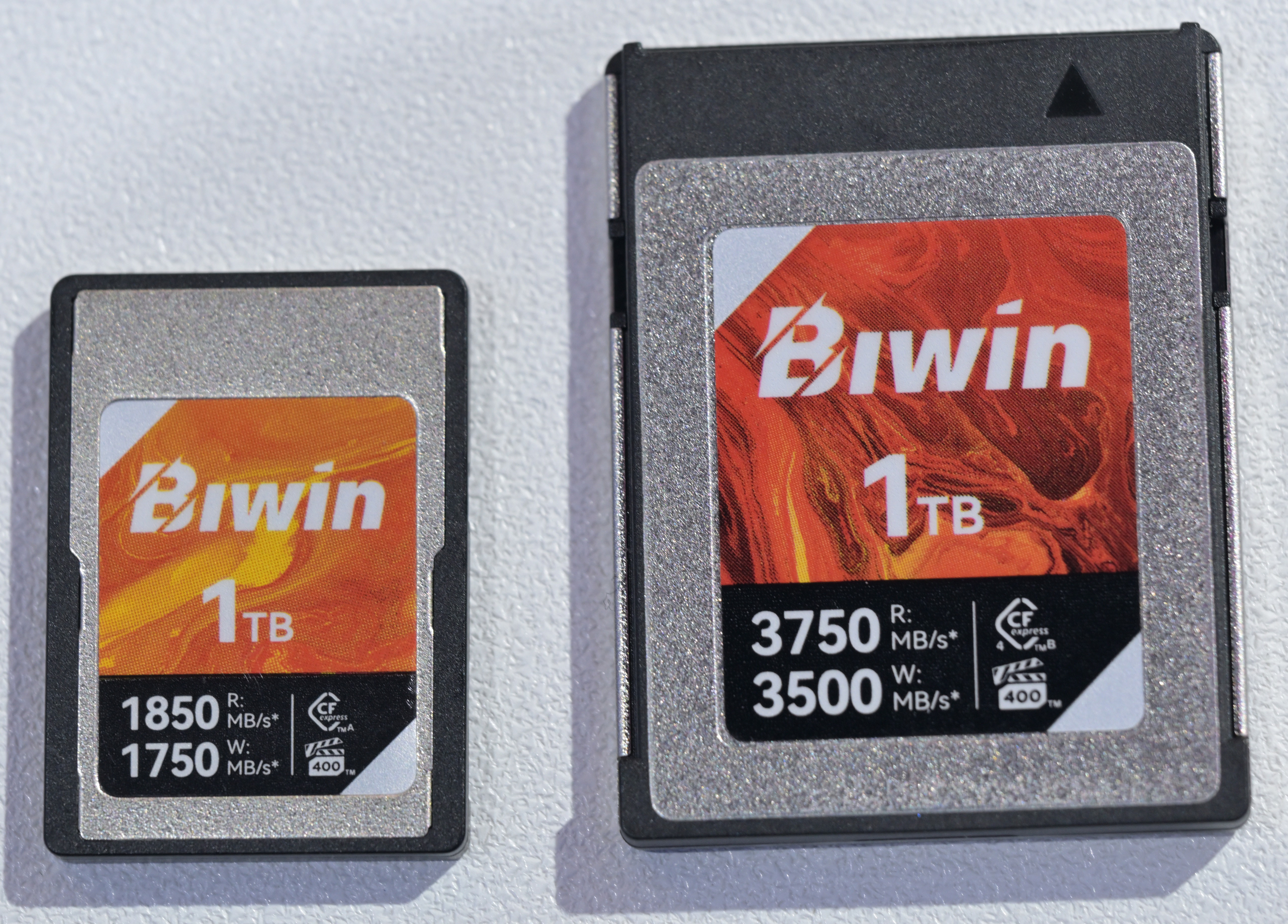
CFexpress Type A (left) and Type B (right) cards

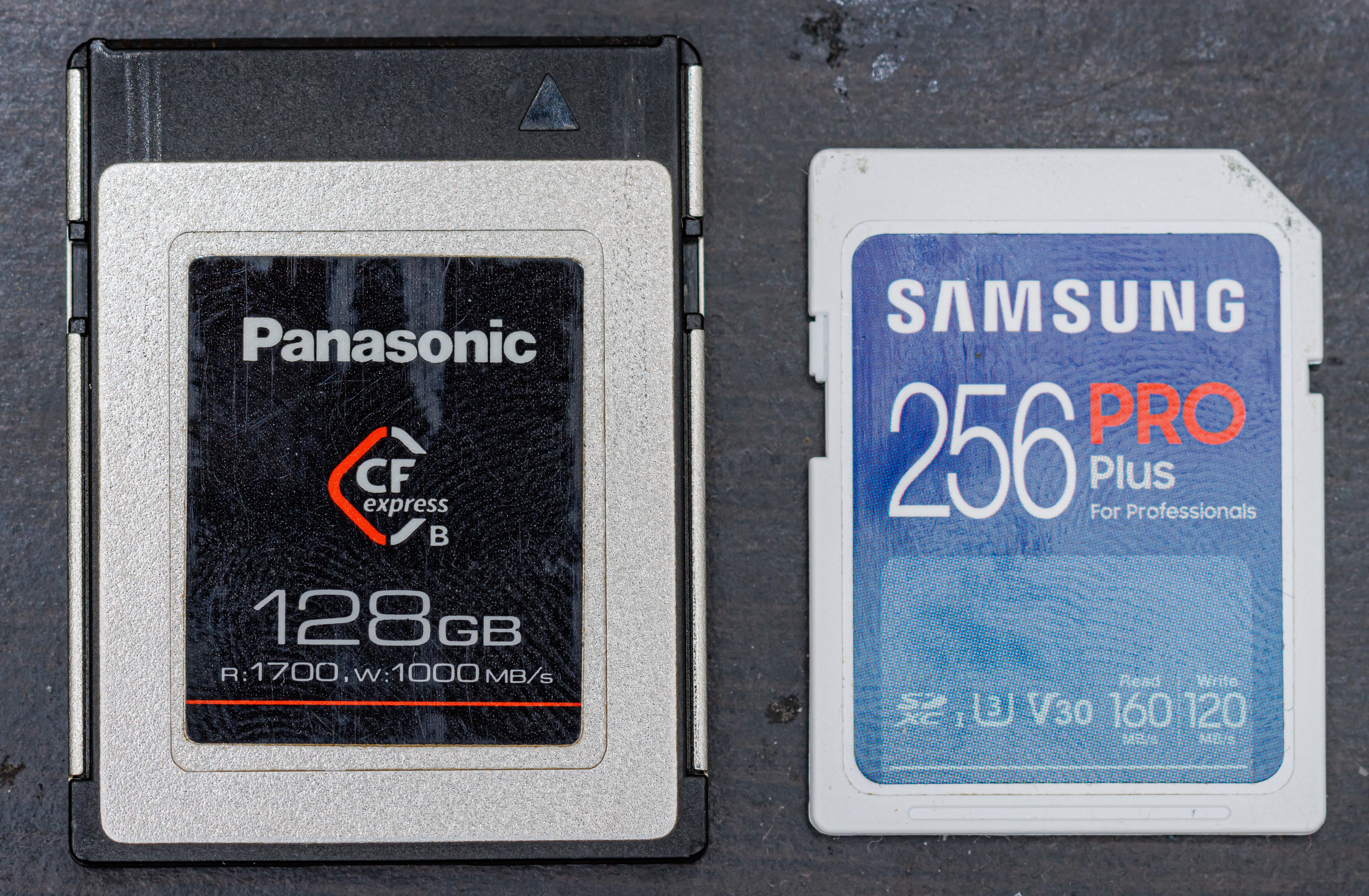
CFexpress Type B (left) next to an SD card (right)

== See also ==
- CompactFlash
- Memory cards
- PCI Express
- NVM Express
- XQD card
- SD Express
