= XQD card =

Memory card format

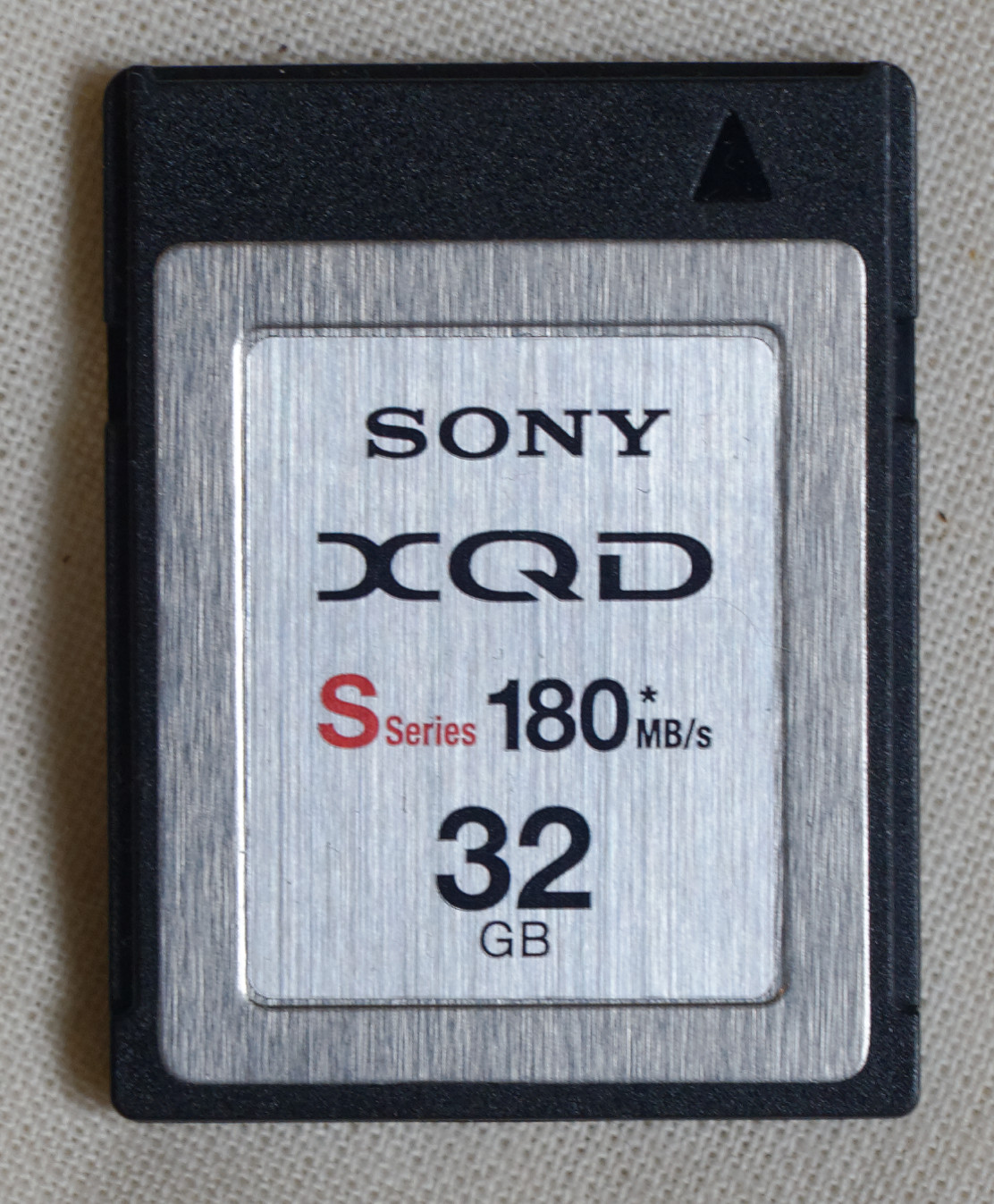
- Media type: Memory card
- Capacity: Over 2 TiB
- Developed by: CompactFlash Association
- Dimensions: 38.5 × 29.8 × 3.8 mm (1.52 × 1.17 × 0.15 in)
- Usage: Digital cameras

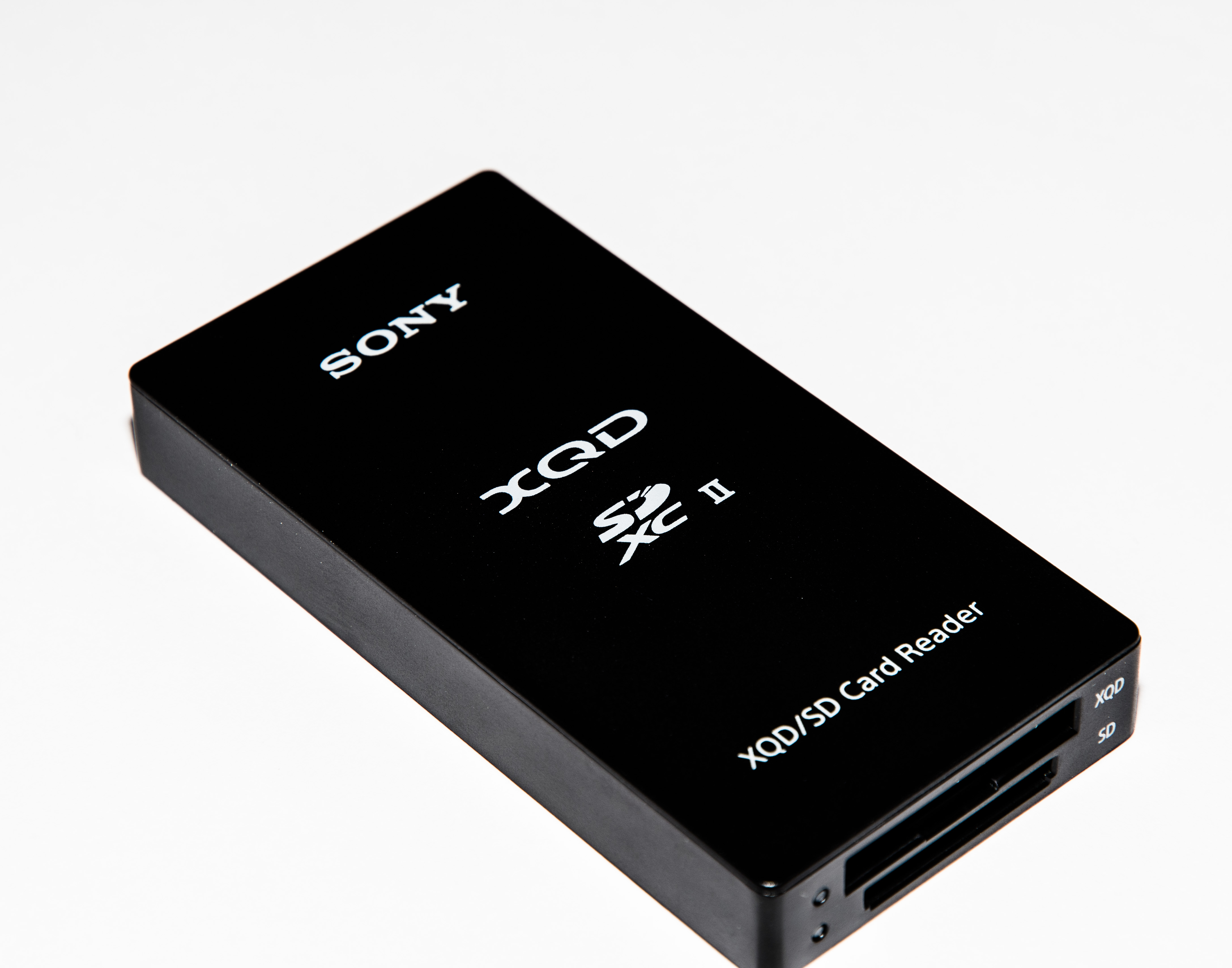
An XQD card reader from Sony

The XQD card is a memory card format primarily developed for flash memory cards. It uses PCI Express as a data transfer interface.

The format is targeted at high-definition camcorders and high-resolution digital cameras. It offers target read and write speeds from 1 Gbit/s to about 5 Gbit/s and storage capabilities beyond 2 TiB.

The cards are not backward compatible with CompactFlash or CFast cards, and despite the name similarity, has no connection with the xD-Picture Card. XQD and CFast were both designed as a replacement of the 1994 CompactFlash standard.

The format was first announced in November 2010 by SanDisk, Sony and Nikon, and was immediately picked up by the CompactFlash Association for development. The final specification was announced in December 2011.

XQD version 2.0 was announced in June 2012, featuring support for PCI Express 3.0 with transfer rates up to 8 Gbit/s (1 GB/s).

On 7 September 2016 the CFA announced the successor of XQD, CFexpress. This new standard uses the same form-factor and interface but uses the NVMe protocol for higher speeds, lower latencies and lower power consumption. Some cameras with XQD slots have received firmware updates to allow use of CFexpress Type B cards in their XQD slots.

== Support ==
In January 2012, the first XQD card was announced by Sony, declaring a 1 Gbit/s read and write speed. In July 2012, Lexar (owned at the time by Micron) announced plans to support the XQD format.

As of 2012, SanDisk and Kingston had not announced plans to produce XQD cards.

In addition to Sony, as of August 2018, Nikon and Delkin are also manufacturing XQD cards.

In late 2018, Lexar – by then under new ownership – announced that it would discontinue support for the XQD format in favour of CFexpress, citing problems with control, licensing and product availability.

== Hosts ==
Sony has said their broadcast camcorders (XDCAM and XDCAM EX) will support the XQD cards. For their broadcast products the XQD card will be classified as a secondary media as XQD is based around consumer technology. Nonetheless, the cards will support acquisition in the broadcast quality MPEG HD422 50 Mbit/s format. On 4 September 2013, Sony released the PXW-Z100, a 4K prosumer camera that records onto XQD cards. Additionally, Sony’s PXW-FS7 and PXW-FX9 cameras also support XQD cards.

Nikon supports XQD cards in its newer high-end DSLR and mirrorless cameras: Nikon D4, Nikon D4s, Nikon D5, Nikon D6, Nikon D850, Nikon D500 and Nikon Z6 and Nikon Z7.

Phase One XF IQ4 camera system (three bodies) supports XQD cards.

== See also ==
- CFast
- CFexpress
- Comparison of memory cards
