= High Definition Earth Viewing cameras =

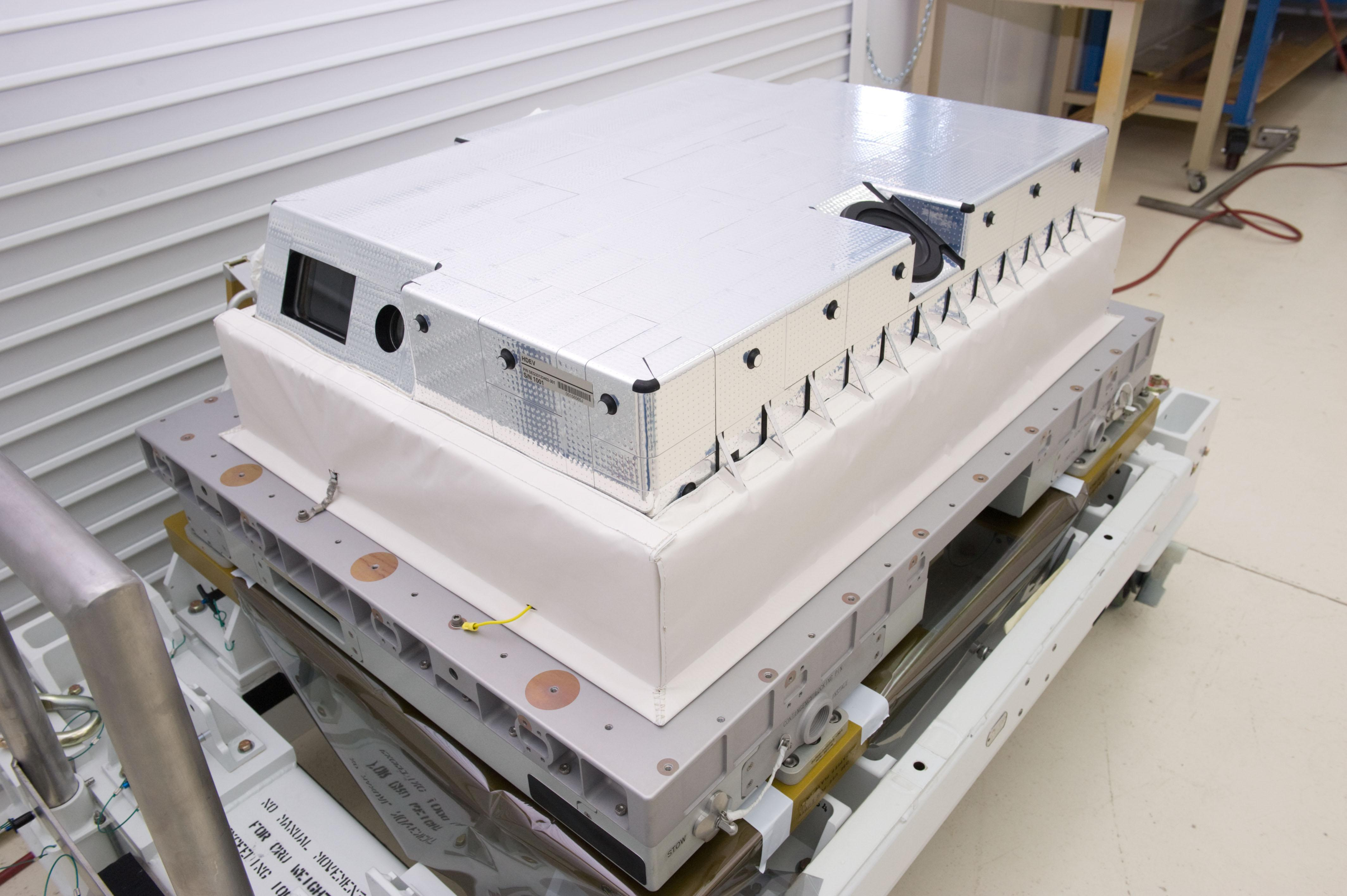
HDEV Completed Flight Assembly

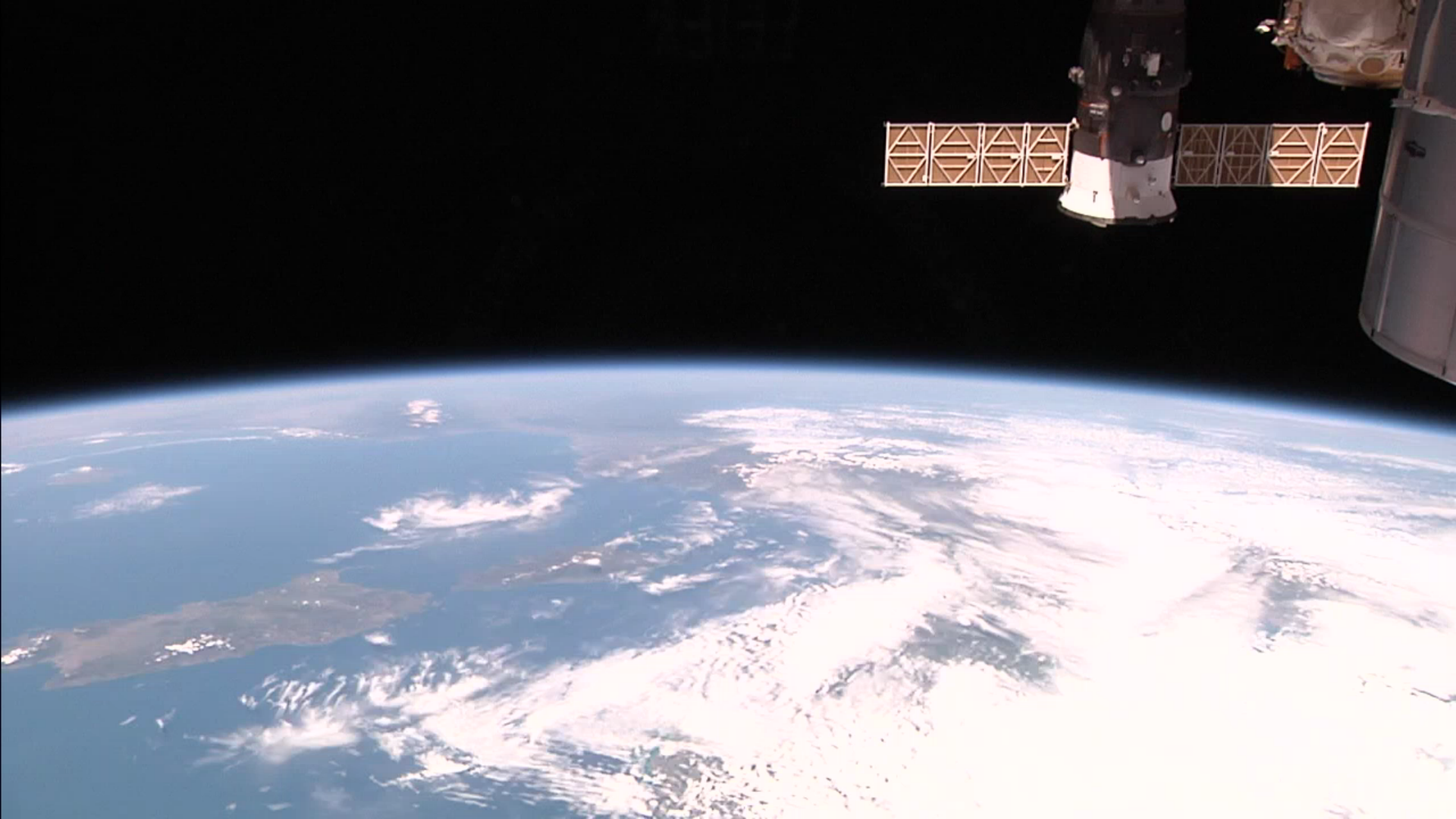
Screenshot from HDEV videostream.

Sunrise in Québec as seen by HDEV camera.

High Definition Earth Viewing (HDEV) cameras were a payload package delivered to the International Space Station on the SpaceX CRS-3 Mission, launched on April 18, 2014. The High-Definition Earth Viewing camera suite was carried aboard the Dragon spacecraft and is configured on a platform on the exterior of the European Space Agency's Columbus laboratory module. It was the first large unpressurized NASA experiment to be assigned for delivery to the International Space Station by SpaceX. The system is composed of four commercial high definition video cameras which were built to record video of the Earth from multiple angles by having them mounted on the International Space Station. The cameras streamed live video of Earth to be viewed online and on NASA TV on the show Earth Views. Previously-recorded video now plays in a continuous loop on public streaming sites.

The HDEV system was developed by engineers at the Johnson Space Center in Houston, Texas. High school students also helped design some of the cameras' components, through the High Schools United with NASA to Create Hardware program, and teams of students were expected to remotely operate the experiment.

The system is configured on the Columbus – External Payload Facility, which is a platform on the exterior of the European Space Agency's Columbus laboratory module where it was used to perform experiments to help NASA determine which cameras work best in outer space. The cameras are enclosed in a temperature-specific housing and exposed to the harsh radiation of space.

The German educational project "Columbus Eye – Live Imagery from the ISS in Schools", which is executed by the University of Bonn and is funded by the German Aerospace Center (DLR), aims at the implementation of the ISS live imagery and videos in a web portal. It primarily acts as a learning portal for pupils, but also serves as a free access archive for the footage of the ISS HDEV cameras. Columbus Eye accompanied the ISS mission of the German ESA astronaut Alexander Gerst (May to November 2014).

On August 22, 2019, the experiment reached its end of life. Originally expected to operate 1 to 3 years, it continued for over 5 years, attaining over 318 million views. The HDEV system was removed from the Columbus module on May 7, 2020, and transferred into the Cygnus NG-13 resupply spacecraft for disposal via destructive re-entry at the end of its mission.

Following HDEV end of life, two of the International Space Station External High Definition Cameras (EHDCs) have been used to provide video to the HDEV live feed. The Node 2 Zenith EHDC was used until the installation of the S3 (Starboard 3) Aft EHDC.

== See also ==
- List of cameras on ISS
