= Nikon D6 =

Digital single-lens reflex camera

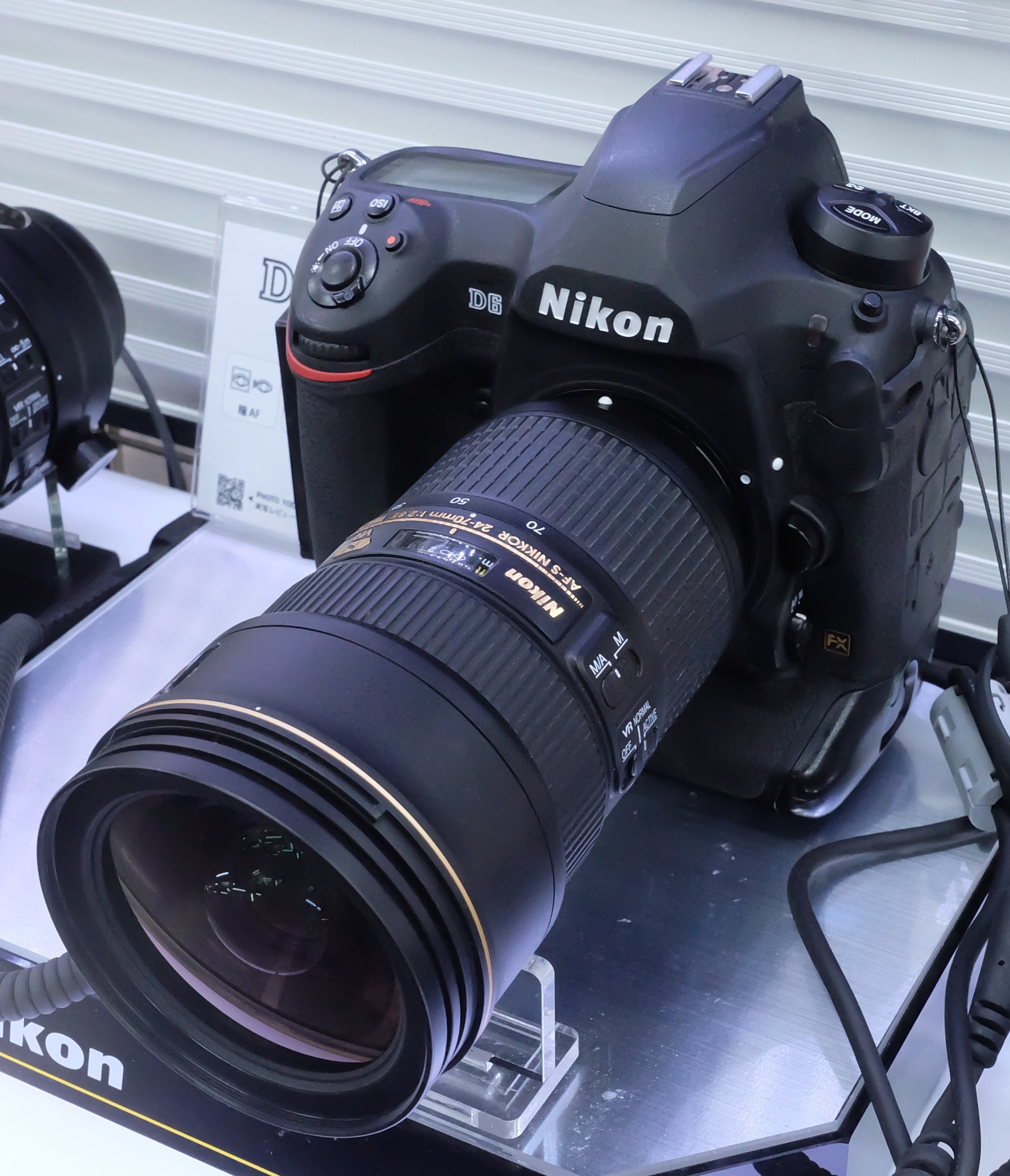
- Nikon D6 + AF-S NIKKOR 24-70mm f/2.8E ED VR

Overview
- Maker: Nikon
- Type: Digital single-lens reflex camera
- Production: 2020-02-11 through 2025-05 (5 years 3 months)
- Intro price: US$6,499.95

Lens
- Lens mount: Nikon F-mount
- Lens: Interchangeable

Sensor/medium
- Sensor: 36.0 mm × 23.9 mm, Nikon FX format, 6.4 µm pixel size
- Sensor type: CMOS
- Sensor maker: Nikon manufactured by Sony which purchased Toshiba's image sensor business
- Maximum resolution: 5568 × 3712 pixels (20.8 megapixels)
- Film speed: ISO equivalency 100 to 102,400 in 1/3, 1/2 or 1.0 EV steps, Boost: 50–3,280,000 in 1/3, 1/2 or 1.0 EV steps
- Storage media: Two CFexpress (Type-B) card slots

Focusing
- Focus modes: Auto selection (AF-A), Continuous-servo (AF-C), Single-servo AF (AF-S), Face-Priority AF (Live View and D-Movie only), Manual (M) with electronic rangefinder
- Focus areas: 105-area Nikon Advanced Multi-CAM 37K; 105 points user-selectable

Exposure/metering
- Exposure modes: Programmed Auto [P], Shutter-Priority Auto [S], Aperture-Priority Auto [A], Manual [M]
- Exposure metering: 180,000 pixels RGB TTL exposure metering sensor

Flash
- Flash: Built-in: no Hot shoe

Shutter
- Shutter: Electronically controlled vertical-travel focal-plane shutter
- Shutter speed range: 30 to 1/8000 second and bulb
- Continuous shooting: 14 frame/s up to 200 RAW images

Viewfinder
- Viewfinder: Optical-type fixed eye level pentaprism, 100% coverage, 0.72x magnification

Image processing
- Image processor: EXPEED 6

General
- Video recording: 4K up to 30 fps 1080p up to 60 fps
- LCD screen: 3.2-inch diagonal, (2,359,000 dots), touchscreen
- Battery: EN-EL18c Lithium-ion battery
- Dimensions: 6.3 by 6.5 by 3.7 inches (160 mm × 165 mm × 94 mm)
- Weight: 1,450 g w/ battery and 2 CFexpress cards
- Latest firmware: 1.70 / 5 August 2025; 8 months ago
- Made in: Japan

Chronology
- Predecessor: Nikon D5
- Successor: Nikon Z9

The Nikon D6 is a full frame professional DSLR camera announced by Nikon Corporation on February 11, 2020, to succeed the D5 as its flagship DSLR. It has a resolution of 20.8 MP, like the D5. The D6 had a newer Expeed 6 processor that supports burst shooting at up to 14 fps. It has 105 cross type focus points.

The D6 was discontinued in May 2025.

== Features ==
While the D6 retained many features of the Nikon D5, it offered the following new features and improvements:

- Nikon EXPEED 6 image processor
- Supports burst shooting at up to 14 fps
- New Multi-CAM 37K autofocus sensor module with 105 focus points, all cross-type sensors
- Increasing continuous shooting speed to 14 fps with full AF
- Dual CFexpress (Type B) card slots, compatible as well with XQD cards
- 105 focus points all of which are cross points.
- Built in WiFi and Bluetooth
- Support for GNS systems: GPS, GLONASS, QZSS
- Exposure up to 900 seconds
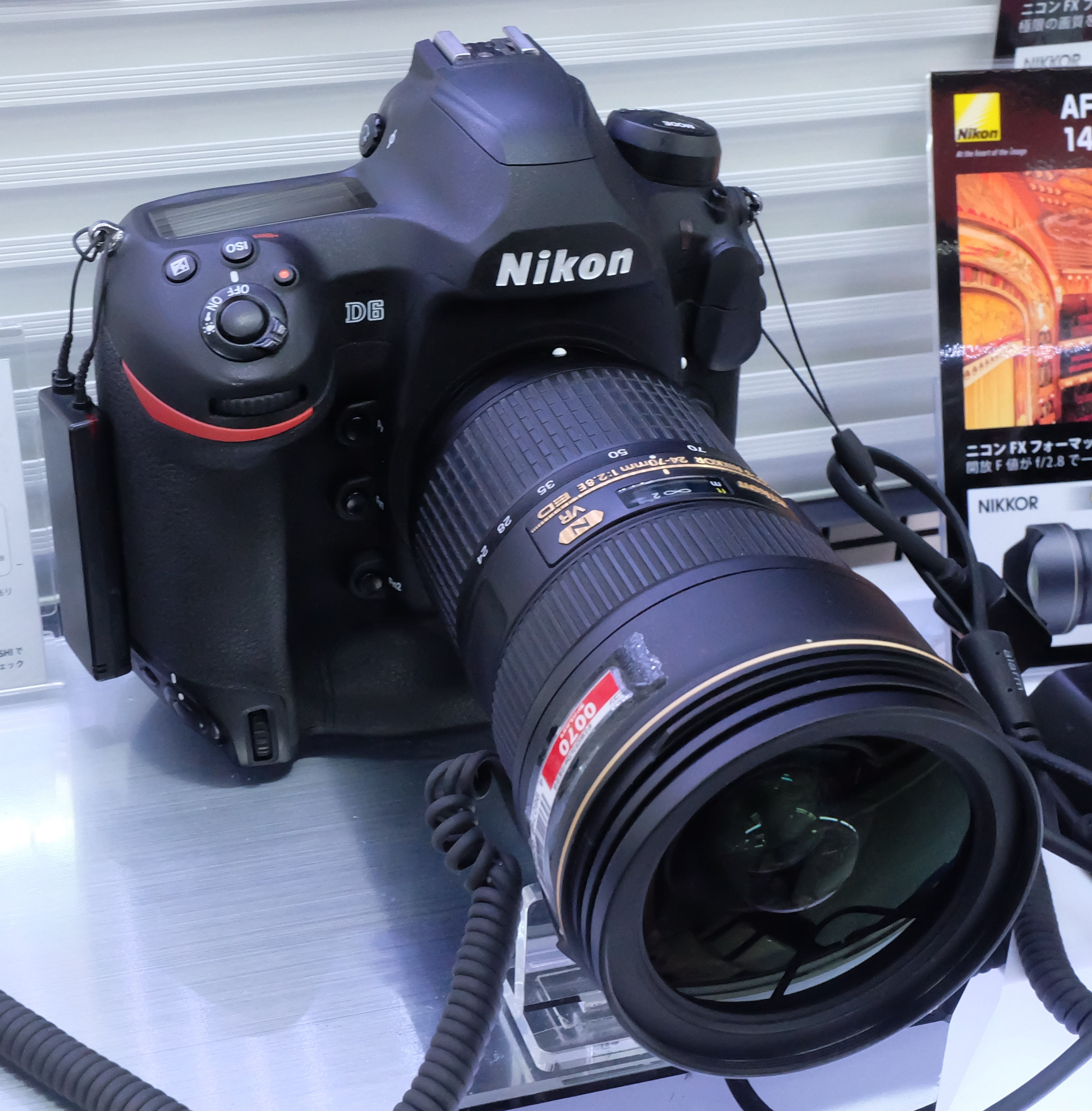

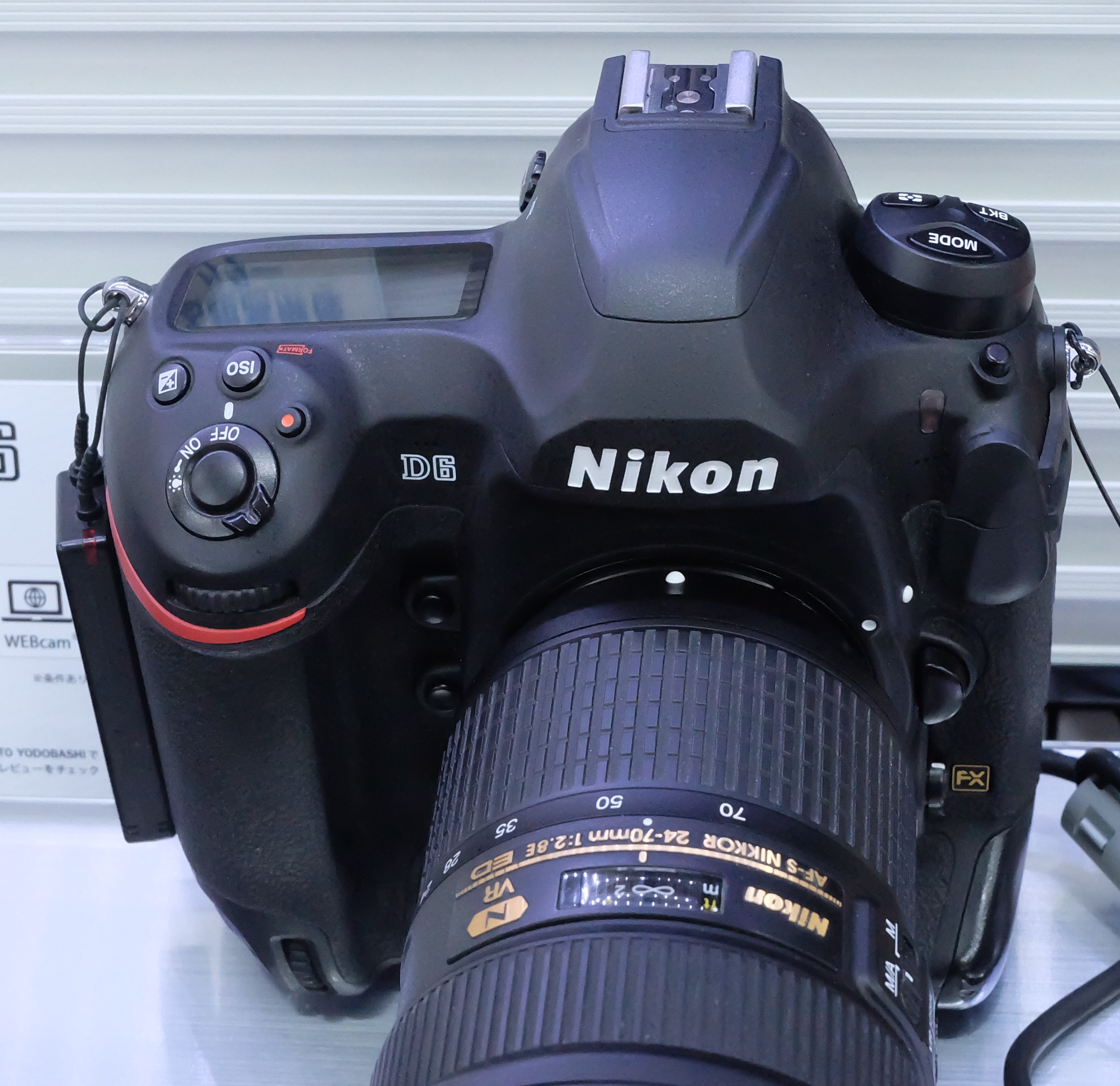

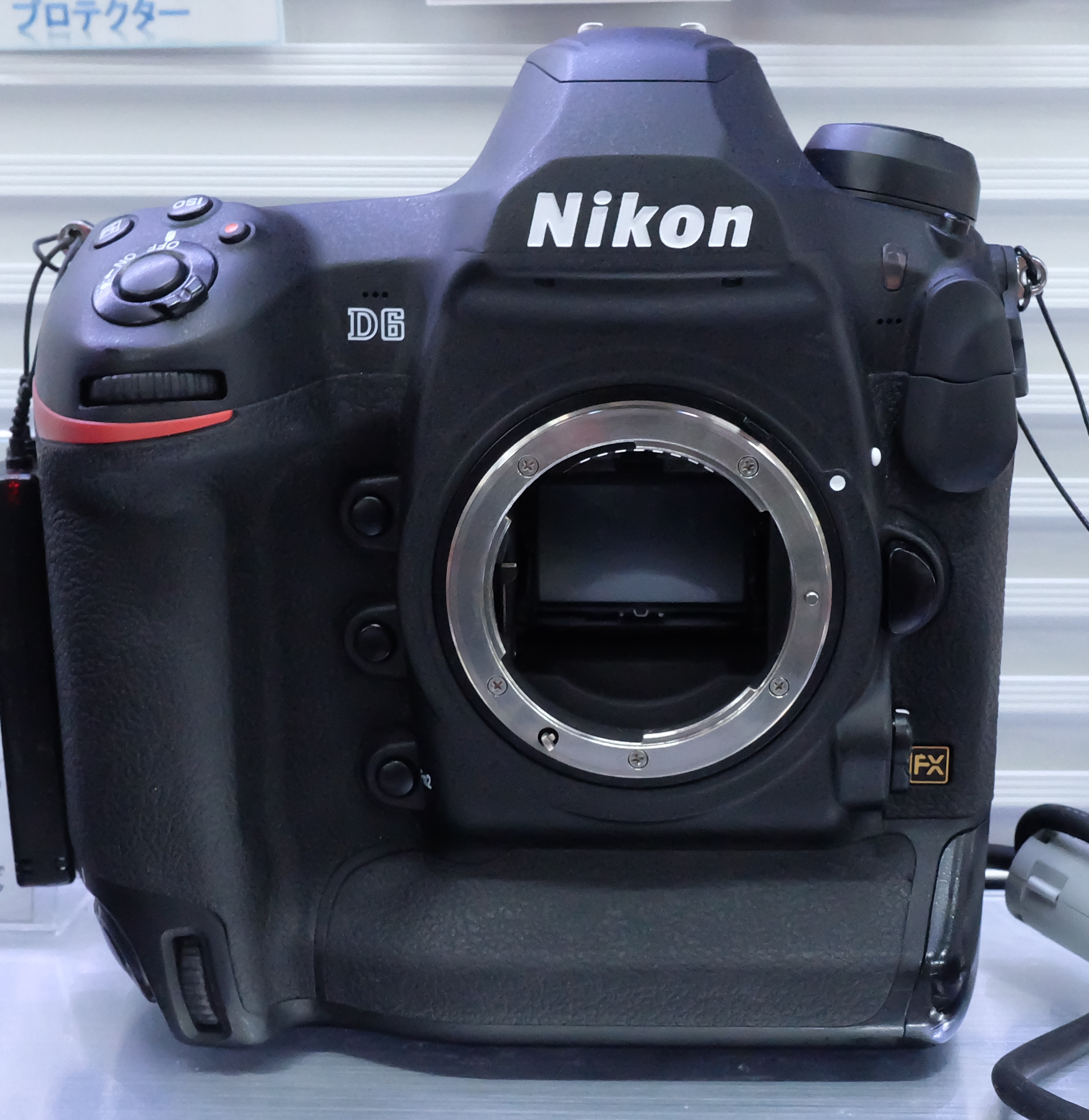

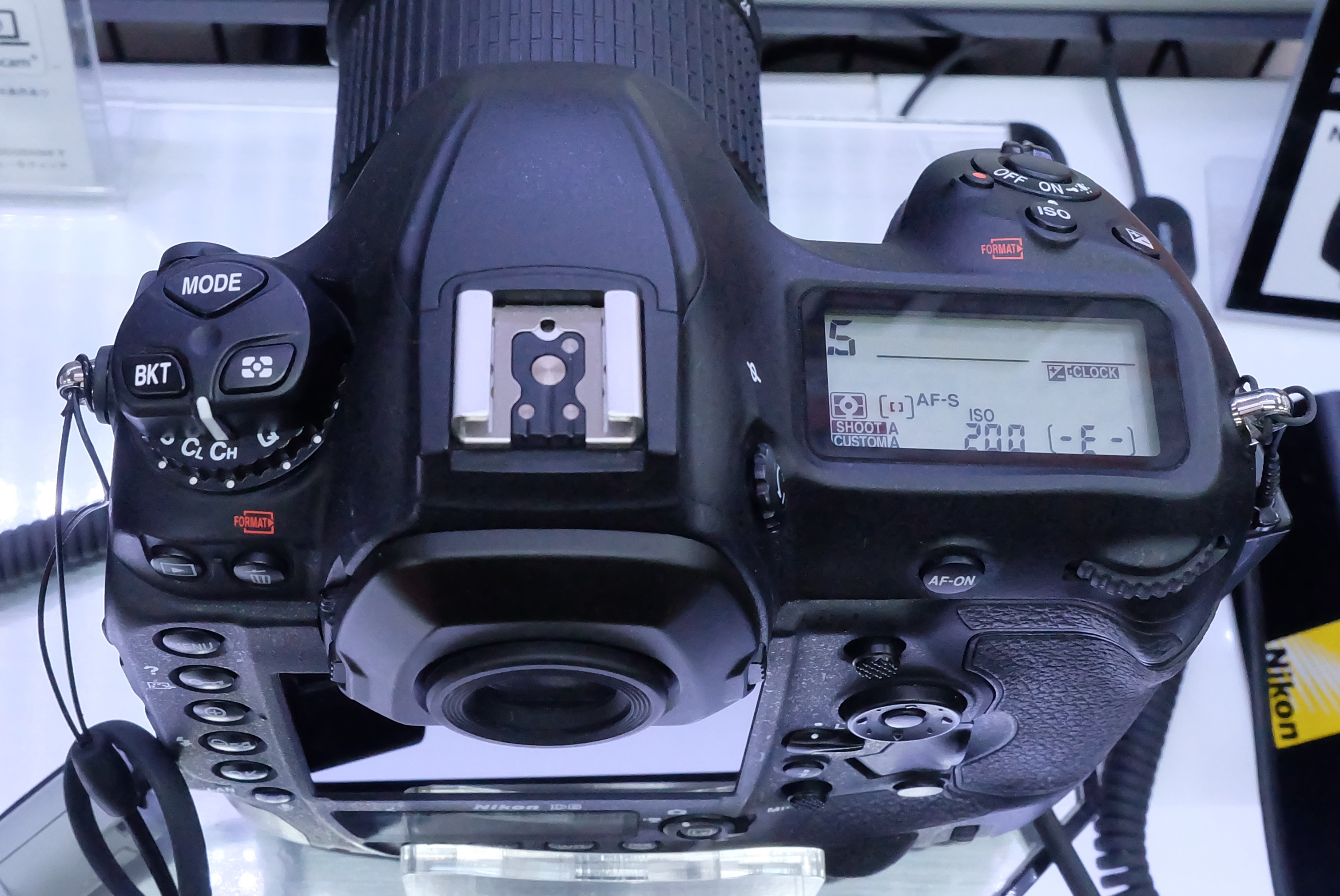

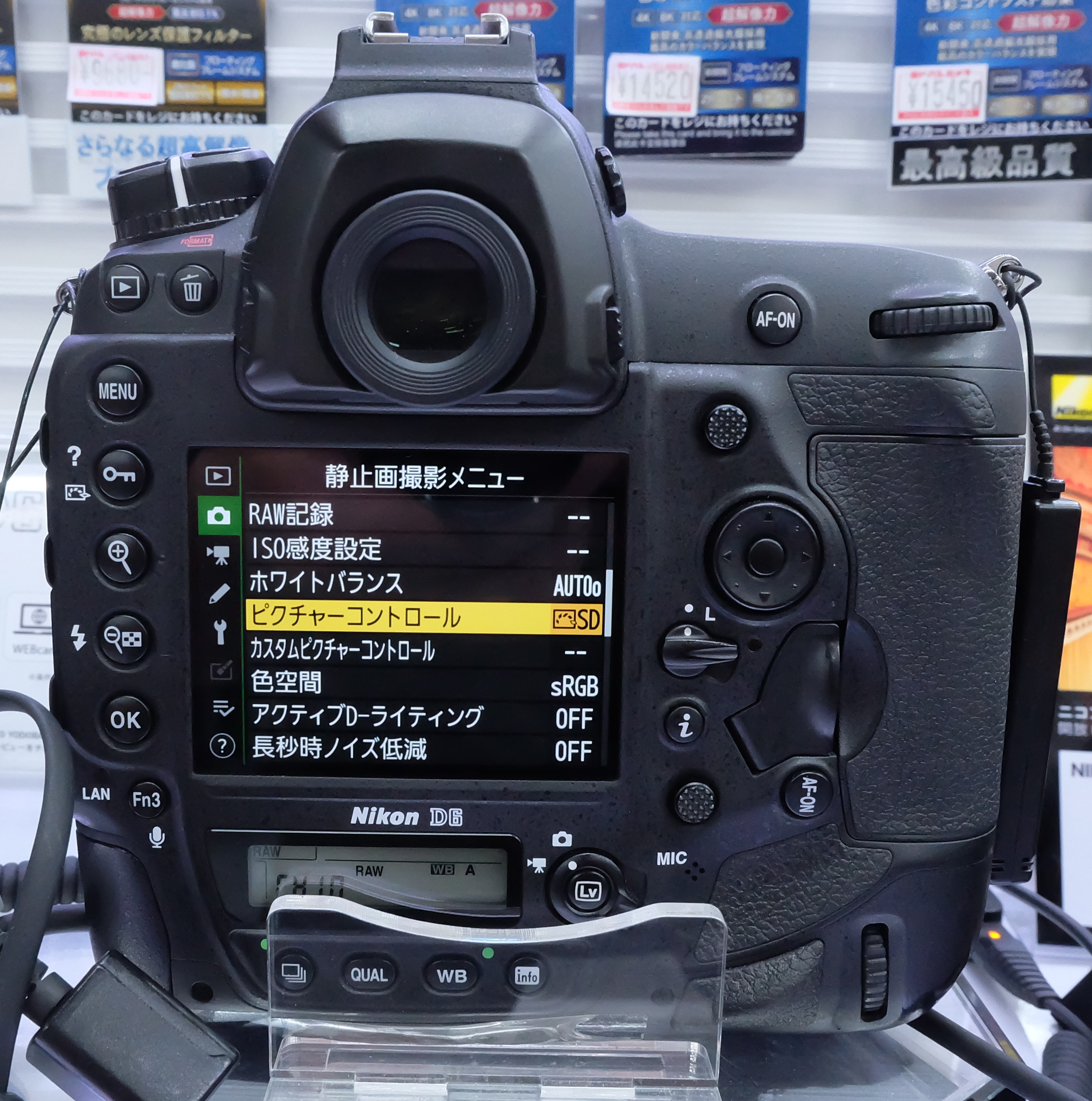

== See also ==
- Nikon D4s
- Nikon D5
- Nikon Z9

Sensor	Class	'99	'00	'01	'02	'03	'04	'05	'06	'07	'08	'09	'10	'11	'12	'13	'14	'15	'16	'17	'18	'19	'20	'21	'22	'23	'24	'25	'26
FX (Full-frame)	Flagship											D3X ^{−P}																	
FX (Full-frame)	Flagship										D3 ^{−P}		D3S ^{−P}		D4		D4S		D5^{T}					D6^{T}					
FX (Full-frame)	Professional											D700 ^{−P}			D800/D800E			D810/D810A			D850 ^{AT}								
FX (Full-frame)	Enthusiast																Df												
FX (Full-frame)	Enthusiast																	D750 ^{A}					D780 ^{AT}						
FX (Full-frame)	Enthusiast															D600	D610												
DX (APS-C)	Flagship		D1^{−E}	D1X^{−E}				D2X^{−E}		D2Xs^{−E}																			
DX (APS-C)	Flagship		D1^{−E}	D1H ^{−E}			D2H^{−E}	D2Hs^{−E}																					
DX (APS-C)	Professional				D100^{−E}				D200^{−E}		D300^{−P}		D300S^{−P}						D500 ^{AT}										
DX (APS-C)	Enthusiast						D70^{−E}		D70s^{−E}	D80^{−E}		D90^{−E}		D7000 ^{−P}			D7100	D7200			D7500 ^{AT}								
DX (APS-C)	Upper-entry								D50^{−E}	D40X^{−E*}	D60^{−E*}		D5000^{A−P*}		D5100^{A−P*}	D5200^{A−P*}	D5300^{A*}	D5500^{AT*}		D5600 ^{AT*}									
DX (APS-C)	Entry-level									D40^{−E*}			D3000^{−E*}	D3100^{−P*}		D3200^{−P*}	D3300^{*}			D3400^{*}		D3500^{*}							
Early models		SVC (prototype; 1986); QV-1000C (1988); NASA F4 (1991); E2/E2S (1995); E2N/E2NS (1996); E3/E3S (1998)																											
Sensor	Class																												
Sensor	Class	'99	'00	'01	'02	'03	'04	'05	'06	'07	'08	'09	'10	'11	'12	'13	'14	'15	'16	'17	'18	'19	'20	'21	'22	'23	'24	'25	'26
