= Pense =

Pense may refer to:

- Rural Municipality of Pense No. 160, Saskatchewan, Canada
  - Pense, Saskatchewan, a village in Saskatchewan, Canada
- Lydia Pense, an American rock-soul-jazz singer

== See also ==
- Pence (disambiguation)
