= DVI (disambiguation) =

DVI is Digital Visual Interface, a video interface for digital displays.

DVI may also refer to:

== Science and technology ==
- Device independent file format, a file format used by the TeX typesetting system
- Direct voice input, human computer interaction by voice command
- Digital Video Interactive, a 1980s standard for full-motion desktop video
- Digital Visual Interface
- dvi (prefix), a prefix used to make provisional names of undiscovered chemical elements

== Music ==
- Daemon Viam Invenient, a 2007 album by Czech black metal group Root
- Double Vulgar II, the fourth album by Thighpaulsandra

== Organisations ==
- District Court of the Virgin Islands, a United States territorial court
- Deuel Vocational Institution, a California state prison

== Other uses ==
- 506 (number) in Roman numerals
- 506, the year
- Disaster victim identification, an international system for the identification of victims of a disaster; see forensic archaeology

== See also ==
- D6 (disambiguation), including a list of topics named D.VI, etc.
