= Pence (surname) =

Pence is a surname. Notable people with the surname include:

== Athletes ==
- Elmer Pence (1900–1968), American Major League Baseball outfielder
- Hunter Pence (born 1983), American former Major League Baseball player
- Penny Pence (1929–2025), American swimmer and swim coach
- Rusty Pence (1900–1971), American baseball pitcher

== Politicians and public officials ==
- Donna Pence (born 1942), American politician
- Greg Pence (born 1956), American businessman and politician
- Lafe Pence (1857–1923), American politician
- Martin Pence (1904–2000), American lawyer and judge
- Mike Pence (born 1959), American politician, broadcaster and lawyer, former vice president of the United States
- Otto V. Pence (1882–1936), American politician
- Steve Pence (born 1953), American politician, lieutenant governor of Kentucky
- Thomas Jones Pence (1873–1916), American politician

== Other uses ==
- Caprial Pence, American chef
- Charlotte Pence Bond (born 1993), American writer, daughter of Mike Pence
- Denise Pence (born 1949), American actress
- Ellen Pence (1948–2012), American scholar and social activist
- Gregory Pence (born 1948), American philosopher and academic
- Joanne Pence (fl. 1970–2006), author of romantic comedy mystery novels
- Josh Pence (born 1982), American actor
- Karen Pence (born 1957), American schoolteacher and painter, wife of Mike Pence
- Karen Pence (economist), American economist
- Matt Pence (born 1972), American recording engineer, producer, and drummer
- Robert Pence (born 1945), American businessman
- Rosemarie Pence (born c. 1938), German-American who posed as a Holocaust child survivor
