= Nikon D4S =

Digital camera model

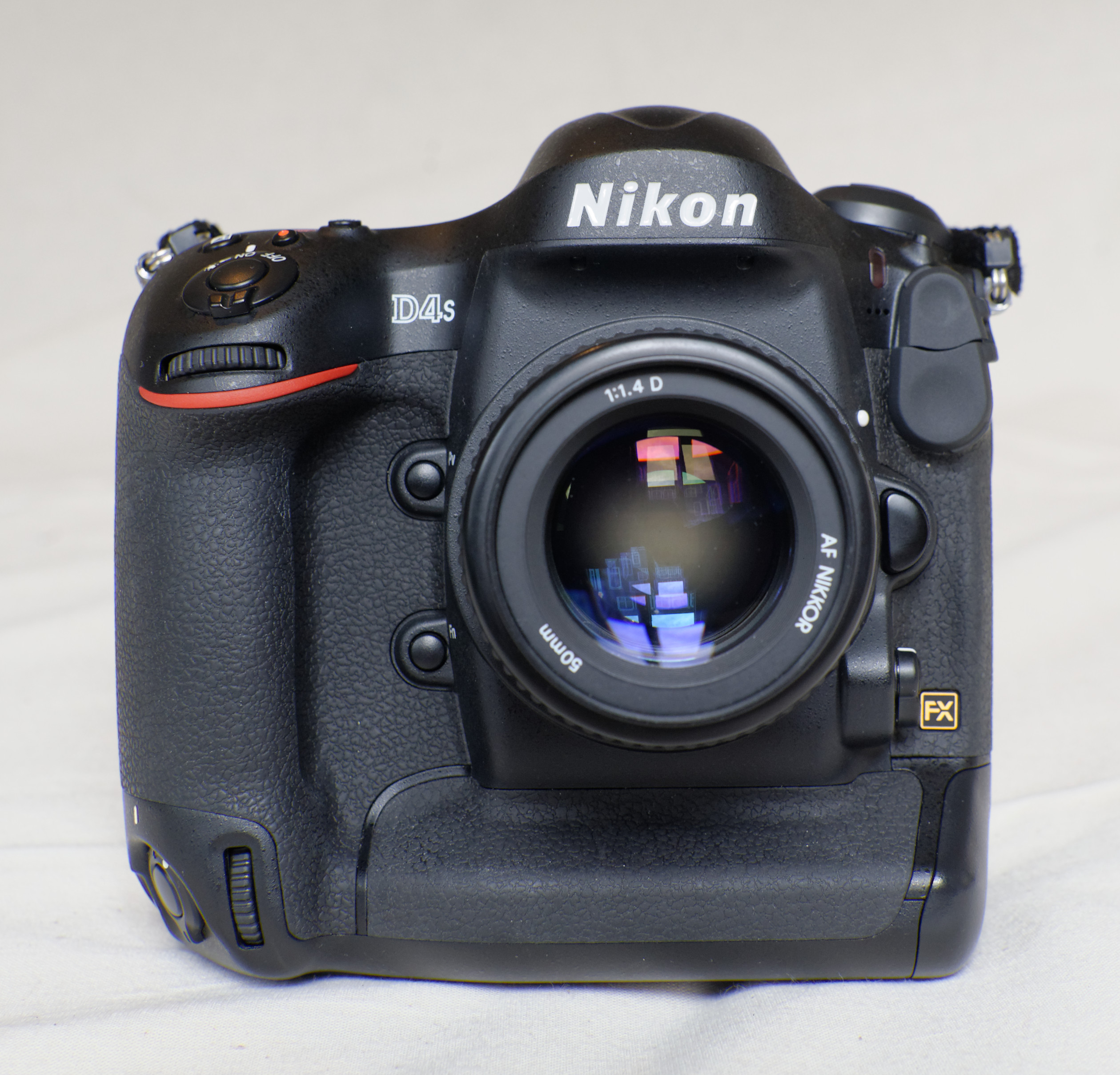

Overview
- Maker: Nikon
- Type: Digital single-lens reflex camera
- Released: 24 February 2014

Lens
- Lens mount: Nikon F-mount
- Lens: Interchangeable

Sensor/medium
- Sensor: 36.0 mm × 23.9 mm, Nikon FX format
- Sensor type: CMOS
- Maximum resolution: 4928 × 3280 pixels (16.2 megapixels)
- Film speed: ISO equivalency 100 to 25,600 in 1/3, 1/2 or 1.0 EV steps, Boost: 50–409,600 in 1/3, 1/2 or 1.0 EV steps
- Storage media: One CompactFlash (Type I) card slot, one XQD card slot

Focusing
- Focus modes: Auto selection (AF-A), Continuous-servo (AF-C), Single-servo AF (AF-S), Face-Priority AF (Live View and D-Movie only), Manual (M) with electronic rangefinder
- Focus areas: 51-area Nikon Advanced Multi-CAM 3500FX

Exposure/metering
- Exposure modes: Programmed Auto [P], Shutter-Priority Auto [S], Aperture-Priority Auto [A], Manual [M]
- Exposure metering: 91,000 pixels RGB TTL exposure metering sensor
- Metering modes: Center-weighted, 3D color matrix metering III, Spot

Flash
- Flash: No integrated flash, external only
- Flash bracketing: 2-9 frames in steps of 1/3, 1/2, 2/3 or 1 EV

Shutter
- Shutter: Electronically controlled vertical-travel focal-plane shutter
- Shutter speed range: 30 to 1/8000 second and bulb
- Continuous shooting: 11 frame/s

Viewfinder
- Viewfinder: Optical-type fixed eye level pentaprism, 100% coverage, 0.7x magnification

Image processing
- White balance: Auto, Presets (12), Manual, and Color temperature in kelvins
- WB bracketing: 2 to 9 frames in steps of 1, 2 or 3 EV

General
- LCD screen: 3.2-inch diagonal, (921,000 dots), TFT VGA
- Battery: Li-Ion EN-EL18a (2,500 mAh)
- Dimensions: 160×157×91 mm (6.3×6.2×3.6 in)
- Weight: 1,180 g (42 oz)
- Latest firmware: 1.33 / 27 February 2018; 7 years ago
- Made in: Japan

Chronology
- Predecessor: Nikon D4
- Successor: Nikon D5

The Nikon D4S is a full frame professional DSLR camera announced by Nikon Corporation on February 25, 2014 to succeed the D4 as its flagship DSLR. The D4S offers a number of improvements over its predecessor including a new image sensor, new image processor, new battery, improved ergonomics and expanded ISO range. Additionally, improved auto focus (AF) algorithms and a new AF Tracking mode were introduced together with a new option of RAW image capture in full resolution (16 MP) or a "Small" file (4 MP).

The D4S was superseded by the Nikon D5, announced on January 6, 2016.

The D4S was discontinued in December 2016.

== Features ==
While the D4S retains many features of the Nikon D4, it offers the following new features and improvements:

- Redesigned 16.2-megapixel image sensor with less noise
- New Expeed 4 image processor
- New Group-area Autofocus mode, allowing five focus points to be grouped for subject tracking
- Exposure smoothing during timelapse recording
- Expanded ISO range of ISO 100–25,600 (boosted range of ISO 50-409,600)
- Gigabit Ethernet port for data transfer and tethered shooting
- Full HD (1920 × 1080) 60p video capture with uncompressed video output via HDMI
- Improved autofocus and subject tracking algorithms
- Improved mirror mechanism, increasing continuous shooting speed to 11fps with AF
- Improved EN-EL18a battery with higher capacity for increased battery life of approximately 3000 shots

== Awards ==
The D4S has won the following awards:

- In May 2014, it received a Technical Image Press Association (TIPA) 2014 Award in the category of "Best Digital SLR Professional".
- In August 2014, it received a European Imaging and Sound Association (EISA) award in the category "European Professional DSLR Camera 2014-2015".

Sensor	Class	'01	'02	'03	'04	'05	'06	'07	'08	'09	'10	'11	'12	'13	'14	'15	'16	'17	'18	'19	'20	'21	'22	'23	'24	'25
FX (Full-frame)	Flagship									D3X ^{−P}																
FX (Full-frame)	Flagship								D3 ^{−P}		D3S ^{−P}		D4		D4S		D5^{T}					D6^{T}				
FX (Full-frame)	Professional									D700 ^{−P}			D800/D800E			D810/D810A			D850 ^{AT}							
FX (Full-frame)	Enthusiast														Df											
FX (Full-frame)	Enthusiast															D750 ^{A}					D780 ^{AT}					
FX (Full-frame)	Enthusiast													D600	D610											
DX (APS-C)	Flagship	D1X^{−E}				D2X^{−E}		D2Xs^{−E}																		
DX (APS-C)	Flagship	D1H ^{−E}			D2H^{−E}	D2Hs^{−E}																				
DX (APS-C)	Professional		D100^{−E}				D200^{−E}		D300^{−P}		D300S^{−P}						D500 ^{AT}									
DX (APS-C)	Enthusiast				D70^{−E}		D70s^{−E}	D80^{−E}		D90^{−E}		D7000 ^{−P}			D7100	D7200			D7500 ^{AT}							
DX (APS-C)	Upper-entry						D50^{−E}	D40X^{−E*}	D60^{−E*}		D5000^{A−P*}		D5100^{A−P*}	D5200^{A−P*}	D5300^{A*}	D5500^{AT*}		D5600 ^{AT*}								
DX (APS-C)	Entry-level							D40^{−E*}			D3000^{−E*}	D3100^{−P*}		D3200^{−P*}	D3300^{*}			D3400^{*}		D3500^{*}						
Early models		Nikon SVC (prototype; 1986); Nikon QV-1000C (1988); Nikon NASA F4 (1991); Nikon E2/E2S (1995); Nikon E2N/E2NS (1996); Nikon E3/E3S (1998); D1 (1999)																								
Sensor	Class																									
Sensor	Class	'01	'02	'03	'04	'05	'06	'07	'08	'09	'10	'11	'12	'13	'14	'15	'16	'17	'18	'19	'20	'21	'22	'23	'24	'25
