= Nikon D4 =

Digital single-lens reflex camera

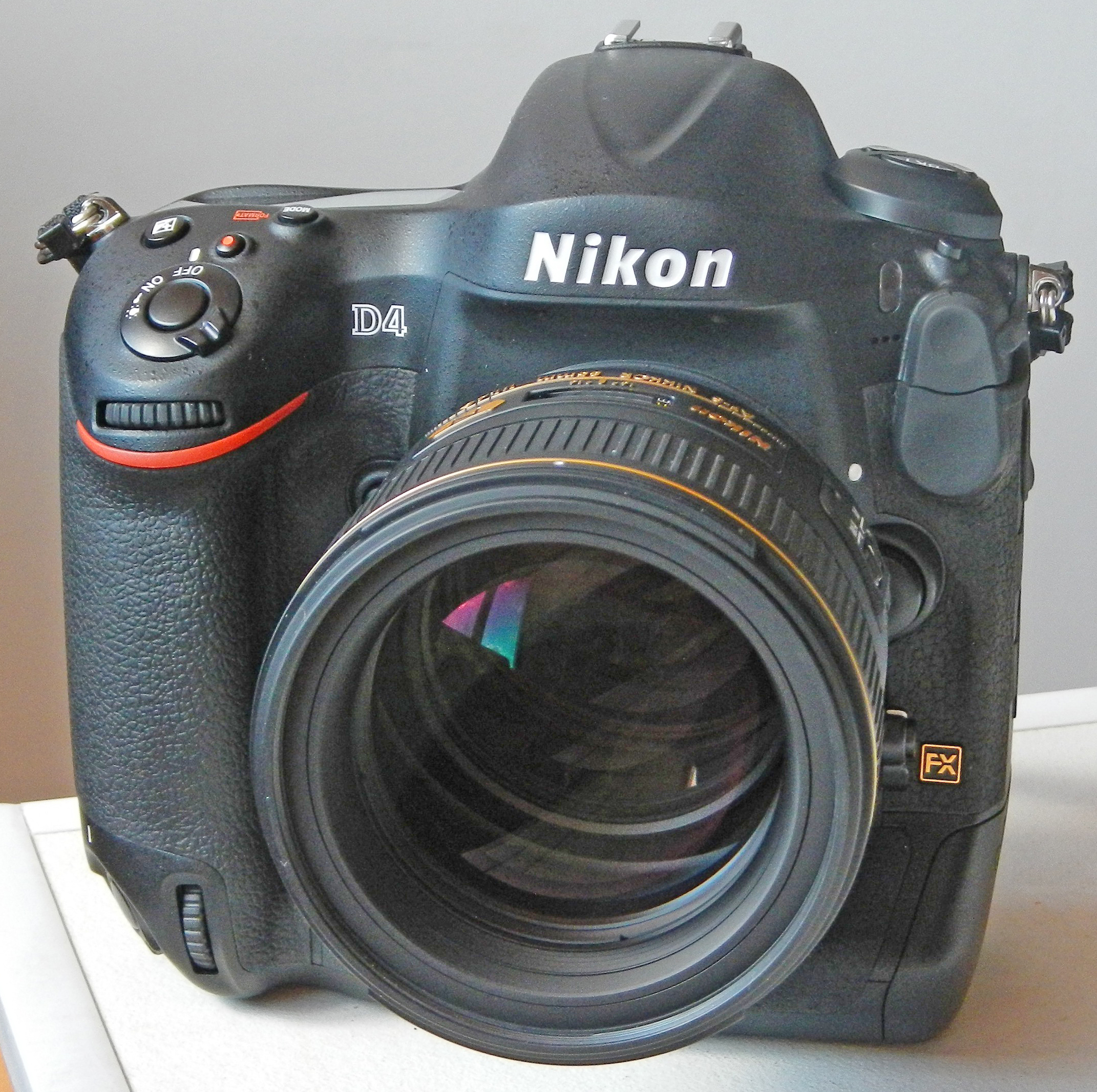

Overview
- Maker: Nikon
- Type: Digital single-lens reflex camera
- Released: 5 January 2012
- Intro price: $5999.95

Lens
- Lens: Interchangeable, Nikon F-mount

Sensor/medium
- Sensor: 36.0 mm × 23.9 mm CMOS, Nikon FX format, 7.3µm pixel size
- Sensor maker: Nikon
- Maximum resolution: 16.4 effective megapixels (4928 × 3280 pixels)
- Film speed: ISO equivalency 100 to 12,800 in 1/3, 1/2 or 1.0 EV steps, Boost: 50–204,800 in 1/3, 1/2 or 1.0 EV steps
- Storage media: One CompactFlash (Type I) card slot, one XQD card slot

Focusing
- Focus modes: Auto AF-S/AF-C selection (AF-A), Continuous-servo (AF-C), Face-Priority AF available in Live View only and D-Movie only, Full-time Servo (AF-A) available in Live View only, Manual (M) with electronic rangefinder, Normal area, Single-servo AF (AF-S), Wide area
- Focus areas: 51-area Nikon Advanced Multi-CAM 3500FX
- Focus bracketing: none

Exposure/metering
- Exposure modes: Programmed Auto [P], Shutter-Priority Auto [S], Aperture-Priority Auto [A], Manual [M]
- Exposure metering: TTL exposure metering using 91,000-pixel RGB sensor
- Metering modes: Center-weighted: Weight of 75% given to 12mm circle in center of frame; Matrix: 3D color matrix metering III (type G and D lenses); color matrix metering III (other CPU lenses); Spot: Meters 4 mm circle (about 1.5% of frame) centered on selected focus point

Flash
- Flash: none built-in
- Flash bracketing: 2-9 frames in steps of 1/3, 1/2, 2/3 or 1 EV

Shutter
- Shutter: Electronically controlled vertical-travel focal-plane shutter
- Shutter speed range: 30 to 1/8000 second and bulb
- Continuous shooting: 10 frame/s (11 frame/s with AE/AF lock on first frame)

Viewfinder
- Viewfinder: Optical-type fixed eye level pentaprism

Image processing
- White balance: Auto, Presets (5), Manual, and Color temperature in kelvins
- WB bracketing: 2 to 9 exposures in increments of 1, 2 or 3 EV

General
- LCD screen: 3.2-inch diagonal, (921,000 dots), TFT VGA
- Battery: Li-ion EN-EL18
- Optional battery packs: EH-6B AC Adapter
- Weight: 1,180 g (2.60 lb)
- Made in: Japan

Chronology
- Predecessor: Nikon D3S
- Successor: Nikon D4S

The Nikon D4 is a 16.2-megapixel professional-grade full frame (35mm) digital single-lens reflex camera (DSLR) announced by Nikon Corporation on 6 January 2012. It succeeds the Nikon D3S and introduces a number of improvements including a 16.2 megapixel sensor, improved auto-focus and metering sensors and the ability to shoot at an extended ISO speed of 204,800. The camera was released in February 2012 at a recommended retail price of $5999.95. It is the first camera to use the new XQD memory cards. It was replaced by the Nikon D4S as Nikon's flagship camera.

The Nikon D4 is aimed at sports and action photographers and photojournalists. With a continuous shooting rate of 10fps, a 20-second burst would yield 200 full-resolution images with full metering and autofocus for each frame. If exposure and focus are locked, the shooting rate can be increased to 11fps.

== Features ==
- 16.4 effective megapixel Full-Frame (36 mm × 24 mm) sensor with ISO 100–12800 (ISO 50–204800 Boost)
- Nikon Expeed 3 image/video processor
- 91,000 pixel RGB metering sensor with Advanced Scene Recognition System
- Advanced Multi-CAM3500FX auto-focus sensor (51-point, 15 cross-type)
- 0.12 s start up time and 0.042 s shutter release delay.
- Image sensor cleaning
- Ten frames per second in continuous FX mode (eleven frames per second with auto-exposure and auto-focus disabled)
- Buffer for 100 RAW or 200 JPEG frames in one burst
- Built-in HDR and time lapse modes
- Built-in 10/100 base-T Ethernet port for data transfers and tethered shooting.
- 1080p Full HD movie mode at 24 fps worldwide and 25 or 30 depending on region, 720p at 25/50 or 30/60 fps, HDMI HD video out with support of uncompressed video output, stereo monitor headphone out, and stereo input (3.5-mm diameter) with manual sound level control.
- Kevlar/carbon fibre composite shutter with a rating of 400,000 actuations
- Live View with either phase detect or improved contrast detect Auto Focus
- Virtual horizon indicates in Live View mode, also available during video capture
- 'Active D-Lighting' with 6 settings and bracketing (adjusts metering and D-Lighting curve)
- Dual card slots, one CompactFlash UDMA and one XQD card slot (mirror, overflow, back-up, RAW on 1/JPEG on 2, Stills on 1/Movies on 2, copy)
- Fully weather sealed with O-rings
- GPS interface for direct geotagging supported by Nikon GP-1

== Reception ==
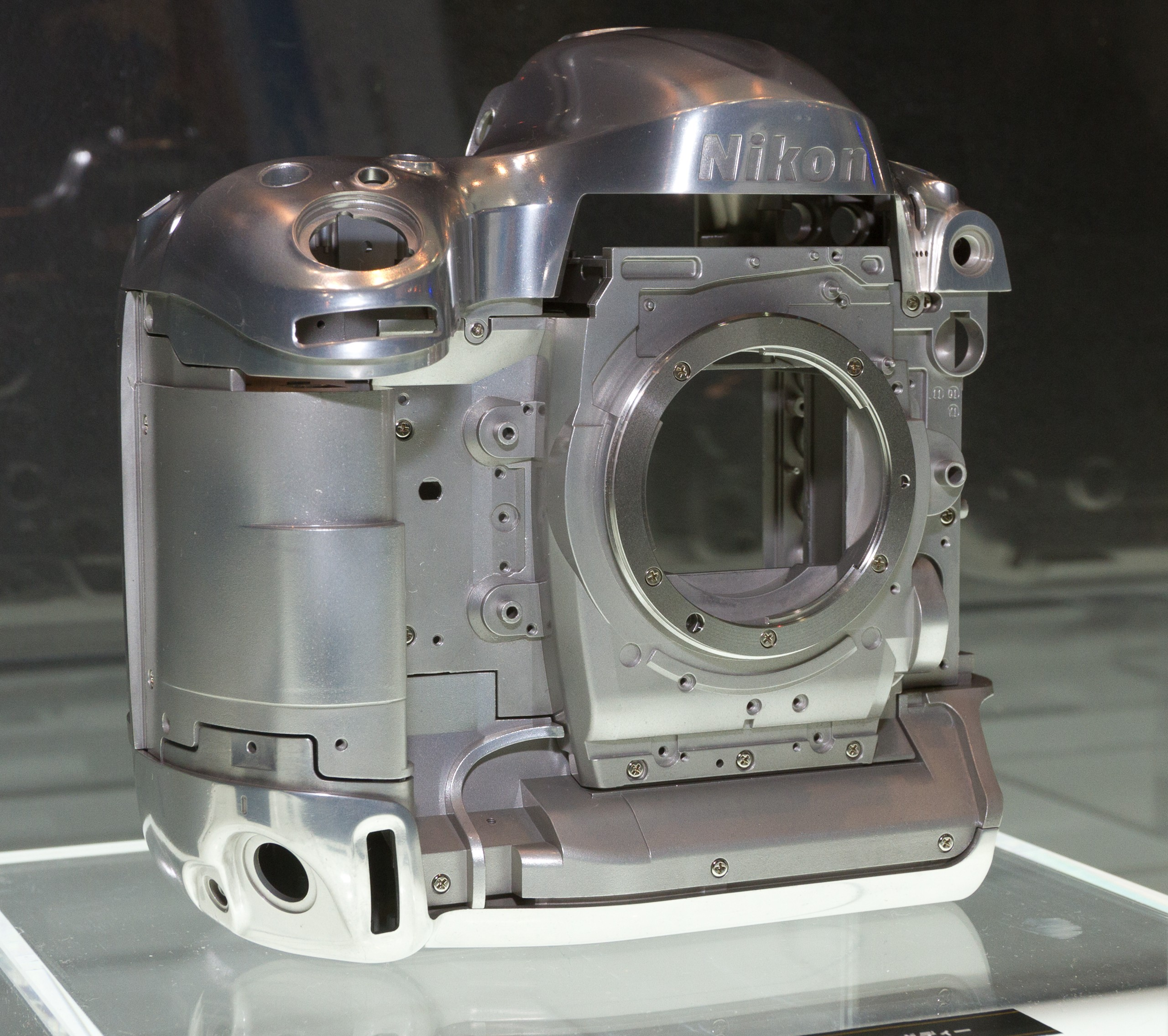
Nikon D4 magnesium-alloy frame

The D4 achieved the fourth-best result in the DXOmark sensor rating, only beaten by two versions of the Nikon D800 and a medium format, 80-megapixel camera (Phase One IQ180).

Sensor	Class	1999	2000	2001	2002	2003	2004	2005	2006	2007	2008	2009	2010	2011	2012	2013	2014	2015	2016	2017	2018	2019	2020	2021	2022	2023	2024	2025	2026
FX (Full-frame)	Flagship											D3X ^{−P}																	
FX (Full-frame)	Flagship										D3 ^{−P}		D3S ^{−P}		D4		D4S		D5^{T}					D6^{T}					
FX (Full-frame)	Professional											D700 ^{−P}			D800/D800E			D810/D810A			D850 ^{AT}								
FX (Full-frame)	Enthusiast																Df												
FX (Full-frame)	Enthusiast																	D750 ^{A}					D780 ^{AT}						
FX (Full-frame)	Enthusiast															D600	D610												
DX (APS-C)	Flagship		D1^{−E}	D1X^{−E}				D2X^{−E}		D2Xs^{−E}																			
DX (APS-C)	Flagship		D1^{−E}	D1H ^{−E}			D2H^{−E}	D2Hs^{−E}																					
DX (APS-C)	Professional				D100^{−E}				D200^{−E}		D300^{−P}		D300S^{−P}						D500 ^{AT}										
DX (APS-C)	Enthusiast						D70^{−E}		D70s^{−E}	D80^{−E}		D90^{−E}		D7000 ^{−P}			D7100	D7200			D7500 ^{AT}								
DX (APS-C)	Upper-entry								D50^{−E}	D40X^{−E*}	D60^{−E*}		D5000^{A−P*}		D5100^{A−P*}	D5200^{A−P*}	D5300^{A*}	D5500^{AT*}		D5600 ^{AT*}									
DX (APS-C)	Entry-level									D40^{−E*}			D3000^{−E*}	D3100^{−P*}		D3200^{−P*}	D3300^{*}			D3400^{*}		D3500^{*}							
Early models		SVC (prototype; 1986); QV-1000C (1988); NASA F4 (1991); E2/E2S (1995); E2N/E2NS (1996); E3/E3S (1998)																											
Sensor	Class																												
Sensor	Class	1999	2000	2001	2002	2003	2004	2005	2006	2007	2008	2009	2010	2011	2012	2013	2014	2015	2016	2017	2018	2019	2020	2021	2022	2023	2024	2025	2026
