= Nikon D5 =

Digital single-lens reflex camera

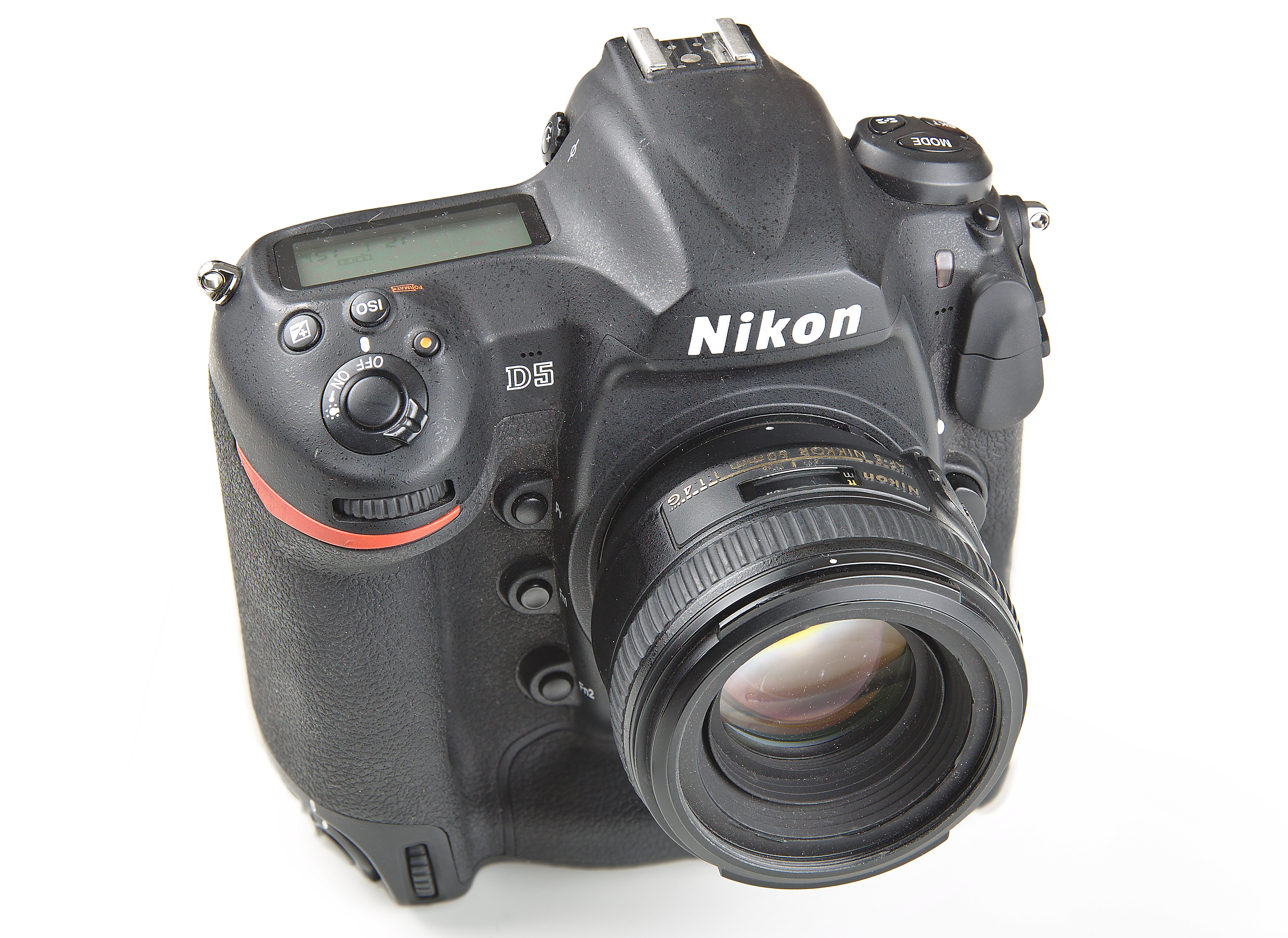

Overview
- Maker: Nikon
- Type: Digital single-lens reflex camera
- Production: 2016-01-06 through 2020-02-12 (4 years 1 month)
- Intro price: US$6,499.95

Lens
- Lens mount: Nikon F-mount
- Lens: Interchangeable

Sensor/medium
- Sensor: 36.0 mm × 23.9 mm, Nikon FX format, 6.4 µm pixel size
- Sensor type: CMOS
- Sensor maker: Nikon manufactured by Toshiba
- Maximum resolution: 5568 × 3712 pixels (20.8 megapixels)
- Film speed: ISO equivalency 100 to 102,400 in 1/3, 1/2 or 1.0 EV steps, Boost: 50–3,280,000 in 1/3, 1/2 or 1.0 EV steps
- Storage media: Two CompactFlash (Type I) card slots, or two XQD card slots

Focusing
- Focus modes: Auto selection (AF-A), Continuous-servo (AF-C), Single-servo AF (AF-S), Face-Priority AF (Live View and D-Movie only), Manual (M) with electronic rangefinder
- Focus areas: 153-area Nikon Advanced Multi-CAM 20K; 55 points user-selectable

Exposure/metering
- Exposure modes: Programmed Auto [P], Shutter-Priority Auto [S], Aperture-Priority Auto [A], Manual [M]
- Exposure metering: 180,000 pixels RGB TTL exposure metering sensor

Flash
- Flash: None, External only

Shutter
- Shutter: Electronically controlled vertical-travel focal-plane shutter
- Shutter speed range: 30 to 1/8000 second and bulb
- Continuous shooting: 12 frame/s up to 200 RAW images

Viewfinder
- Viewfinder: Optical-type fixed eye level pentaprism, 100% coverage, 0.72x magnification

General
- Video recording: 4K up to 30 fps 1080p up to 60 fps
- LCD screen: 3.2-inch diagonal, (2,359,000 dots), touchscreen
- Battery: EN-EL18a Lithium-ion battery
- Dimensions: 6.3 by 6.3 by 3.7 inches (160 mm × 160 mm × 94 mm)
- Weight: 49.5 oz (1,400 g) w/ battery and 2 XQD cards
- Latest firmware: 1.50 / 14 June 2022; 3 years ago
- Made in: Japan

Chronology
- Predecessor: Nikon D4S
- Successor: Nikon D6

The Nikon D5 is a full frame professional DSLR camera announced by Nikon Corporation on 6 January 2016 to succeed the D4S as its flagship DSLR. The D5 offers a number of improvements over its predecessor including a new image sensor, new image processor, improved ergonomics and expanded ISO range. Additionally, improved auto focus (AF) modes were introduced. On 23 February 2017, at CP+ show, a special edition was released for Nikon's 100th anniversary.

It was succeeded by the Nikon D6, announced on February 12, 2020.

== Features ==
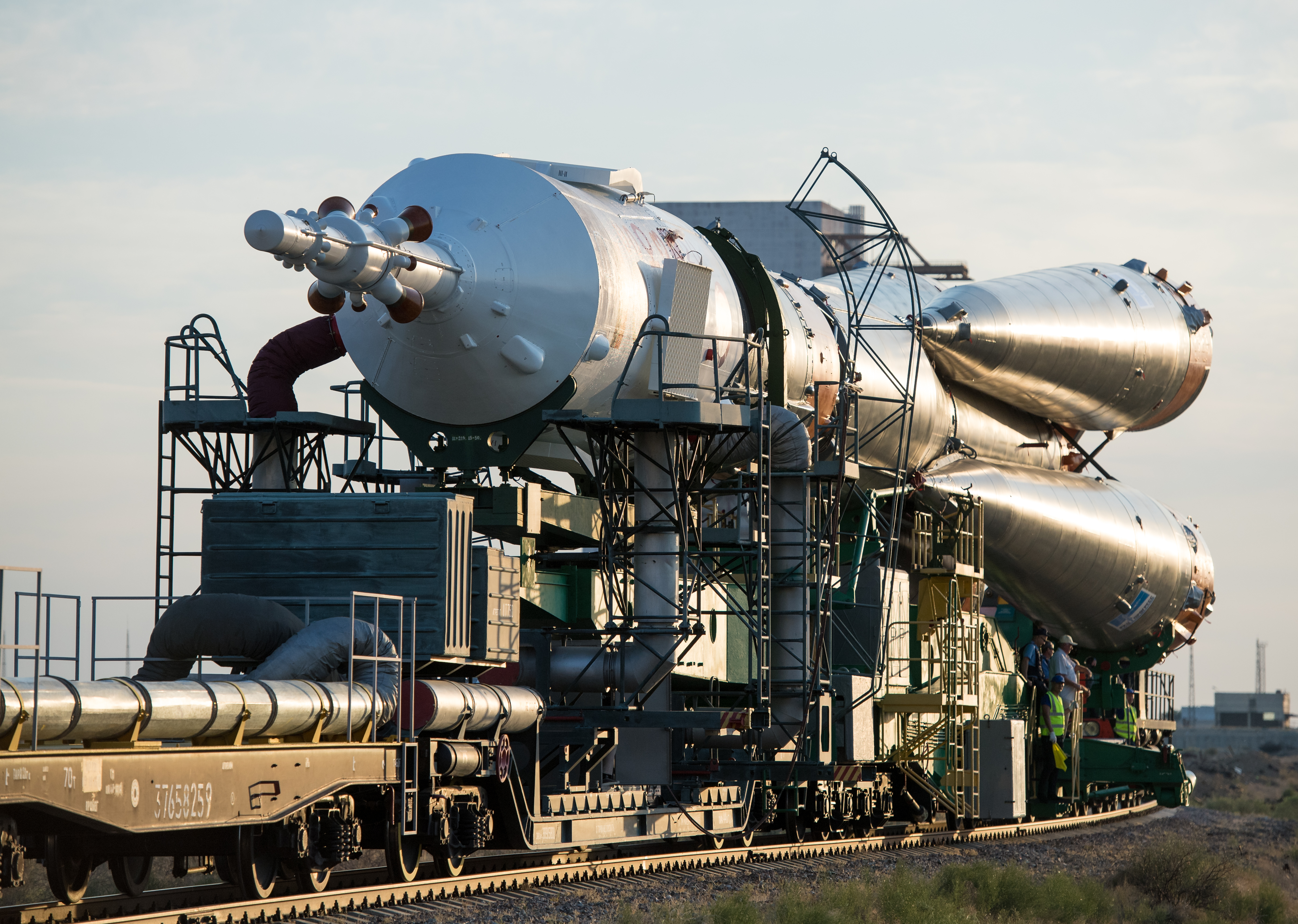
Photo taken with Nikon D5

While the D5 retains many features of the Nikon D4S, it offers the following new features and improvements:

- Redesigned 20.8-megapixel image sensor with less noise
- Nikon EXPEED5 image processor
- Expanded ISO range of ISO 100–102,400 (boosted range of ISO 50–3,280,000)
- 4K video (3840 x 2160) 30p video capture with uncompressed video output via HDMI
- Improved autofocus and subject tracking algorithms
- Increasing continuous shooting speed to 12 fps with full AF
- Touchscreen Rear LCD monitor

In June 2016, a firmware update added several significant improvements:

- The maximum video recording time was increased to 29:59 for all resolutions, including 4K.
- Electronic vibration reduction was added for video shooting.
- A new 9-point dynamic autofocus mode was added for stills shooting.
- Also added for stills shooting was a flicker reduction mode, in which the moment of exposure is adjusted to compensate for flickering electric lighting.

== Use in outer space ==
Hello, World, taken by Reid Wiseman on Artemis II on April 3, 2026

NASA has used these forms of cameras on the International Space Station for internal and Earth photography.

The crew of the Artemis II lunar flyby in 2026 had two of these cameras aboard their Orion spacecraft. Hello, World and Earthset, the first human-taken photographs of the entire Earth since The Blue Marble in 1972, were taken by said crew.

== See also ==
- Nikon
- Nikon D4s
- Nikon D6
- List of cameras on the International Space Station

Sensor	Class	'99	'00	'01	'02	'03	'04	'05	'06	'07	'08	'09	'10	'11	'12	'13	'14	'15	'16	'17	'18	'19	'20	'21	'22	'23	'24	'25	'26
FX (Full-frame)	Flagship											D3X ^{−P}																	
FX (Full-frame)	Flagship										D3 ^{−P}		D3S ^{−P}		D4		D4S		D5^{T}					D6^{T}					
FX (Full-frame)	Professional											D700 ^{−P}			D800/D800E			D810/D810A			D850 ^{AT}								
FX (Full-frame)	Enthusiast																Df												
FX (Full-frame)	Enthusiast																	D750 ^{A}					D780 ^{AT}						
FX (Full-frame)	Enthusiast															D600	D610												
DX (APS-C)	Flagship		D1^{−E}	D1X^{−E}				D2X^{−E}		D2Xs^{−E}																			
DX (APS-C)	Flagship		D1^{−E}	D1H ^{−E}			D2H^{−E}	D2Hs^{−E}																					
DX (APS-C)	Professional				D100^{−E}				D200^{−E}		D300^{−P}		D300S^{−P}						D500 ^{AT}										
DX (APS-C)	Enthusiast						D70^{−E}		D70s^{−E}	D80^{−E}		D90^{−E}		D7000 ^{−P}			D7100	D7200			D7500 ^{AT}								
DX (APS-C)	Upper-entry								D50^{−E}	D40X^{−E*}	D60^{−E*}		D5000^{A−P*}		D5100^{A−P*}	D5200^{A−P*}	D5300^{A*}	D5500^{AT*}		D5600 ^{AT*}									
DX (APS-C)	Entry-level									D40^{−E*}			D3000^{−E*}	D3100^{−P*}		D3200^{−P*}	D3300^{*}			D3400^{*}		D3500^{*}							
Early models		SVC (prototype; 1986); QV-1000C (1988); NASA F4 (1991); E2/E2S (1995); E2N/E2NS (1996); E3/E3S (1998)																											
Sensor	Class																												
Sensor	Class	'99	'00	'01	'02	'03	'04	'05	'06	'07	'08	'09	'10	'11	'12	'13	'14	'15	'16	'17	'18	'19	'20	'21	'22	'23	'24	'25	'26
