= ILCA =

ILCA may refer to:

- International Labor Communications Association, a US organization for trade union publications and media production departments
- ILCA, the designation for some Sony α camera models since 2013
- ILCA (company), a Japanese video game developer
- The International Laser Class Association, which defines the specifications of the Laser sailing dinghy
- ILCA 7, ILCA 6 or ILCA 4, the competition class designations for the dinghies known as the Laser Standard, Laser Radial and Laser 4.7, respectively
- International Livestock Centre for Africa

== See also ==
- ILC (disambiguation)
- ILCE (disambiguation)
