= Immanuel Lutheran School =

Immanuel Lutheran School may refer to:

In Australia;

- Immanuel Lutheran Primary School, Novar Gardens, South Australia, on List of schools in South Australia
- Immanuel Lutheran School, Gawler East, South Australia, on List of schools in South Australia

In the United States of America;

- Immanuel Lutheran School, Riverside, California
- Immanuel Lutheran School, Valparaiso, Indiana
- Immanuel Lutheran School, Saginaw, Michigan, on List of schools in Saginaw, Michigan
- Immanuel Lutheran School, Mankato, Minnesota, on List of high schools in Minnesota
- Immanuel Lutheran School (Perryville, Missouri)
- Immanuel Lutheran School, St. Charles, Missouri
- Immanuel Lutheran School, Wentzville, Missouri
- Immanuel Lutheran School (Greenville, Wisconsin)
- Immanuel Lutheran School, Mankato, Wisconsin, a building designed by architect Albert Schippel

== See also ==
- Immanuel Lutheran College (disambiguation)
