= AFL–CIO Employees Federal Credit Union =

Credit union headquartered in Washington, D.C.

AFL-CIO Employees Federal Credit Union
- Type: Credit union
- Industry: Financial services
- Founded: 1952
- Headquarters: Washington D.C., United States
- Area served: AFL-CIO employees and their families
- Products: Savings; checking; consumer loans; mortgages; credit cards; online banking
- Total assets: $53.599M USD
- Website: aflcioefcu.org
- Footnotes; 9,723 members

The AFL-CIO Employees Federal Credit Union is a multiple common bond, federally chartered credit union headquartered in Washington, D.C. The credit union was founded in 1952 for members of the AFL-CIO. It currently has two locations serving 9,723 members. AFL-CIO Employees FCU has assets of $76 million. The most current annual report lists assets for Fiscal Year ending December 31, 2015, as $53.6 million.

The economic downturn of 2008 negatively affected the credit union with large losses in the first half of the year.

== Membership ==
Employees of the AFL-CIO are eligible for membership in the credit union as are employees of affiliated AFL-CIO International Unions, constitutional departments of the AFL-CIO, and state or local central labor bodies. Eligibility is also extended to members of the Office and Professional Employees International Union – Local 2, the United Food and Commercial Workers – Local 400, the National Football League Players Association and the International Union of Painters and Allied Trades, District Council 51.

== See also ==
- Amalgamated Bank of Chicago
- The Union Credit Union
