= Nikon F =

1959 35mm single-lens reflex camera

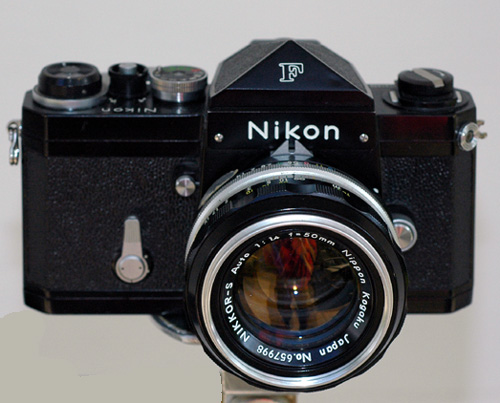
- Nikon F (black)

Overview
- Maker: Nikon (Nippon Kogaku K. K.)
- Type: 35mm SLR
- Released: 1959
- Production: 1959-04 through 1973-10 (14 years 7 months)
- Intro price: US$186

Lens
- Lens mount: Nikon F-mount

Sensor/medium
- Film format: 35 mm
- Film size: 36 mm × 24 mm

Focusing
- Focus: manual

Exposure/metering
- Exposure: manual

Flash
- Flash: non-ISO hot shoe, or PC socket for off-camera flash

Shutter
- Shutter: mechanical

General
- Made in: Japan

Chronology
- Successor: Nikon F2

The Nikon F camera, introduced in April 1959, was Nikon's first SLR camera. It was one of the most advanced cameras of its day. Although many of the concepts had already been introduced elsewhere, it was revolutionary in that it was the first to combine them all in one camera. It was produced until October 1973 and was replaced by the Nikon F2. Aspects of its design remain in all of Nikon's subsequent SLR cameras, through the current Nikon F6 film and Nikon D6 digital models (which still share its Nikon F-mount for lenses). The "F" in Nikon F was selected from the term "re-f-lex", since the pronunciation of the first letter "R" is not available in many Asian languages. That tradition was carried throughout their top-of-the-line of Nikon cameras until the introduction of the Nikon D1 (digital) cameras decades later.

Specially modified Nikon F cameras were used in space in the early 1970s aboard the Skylab space station.

== History ==
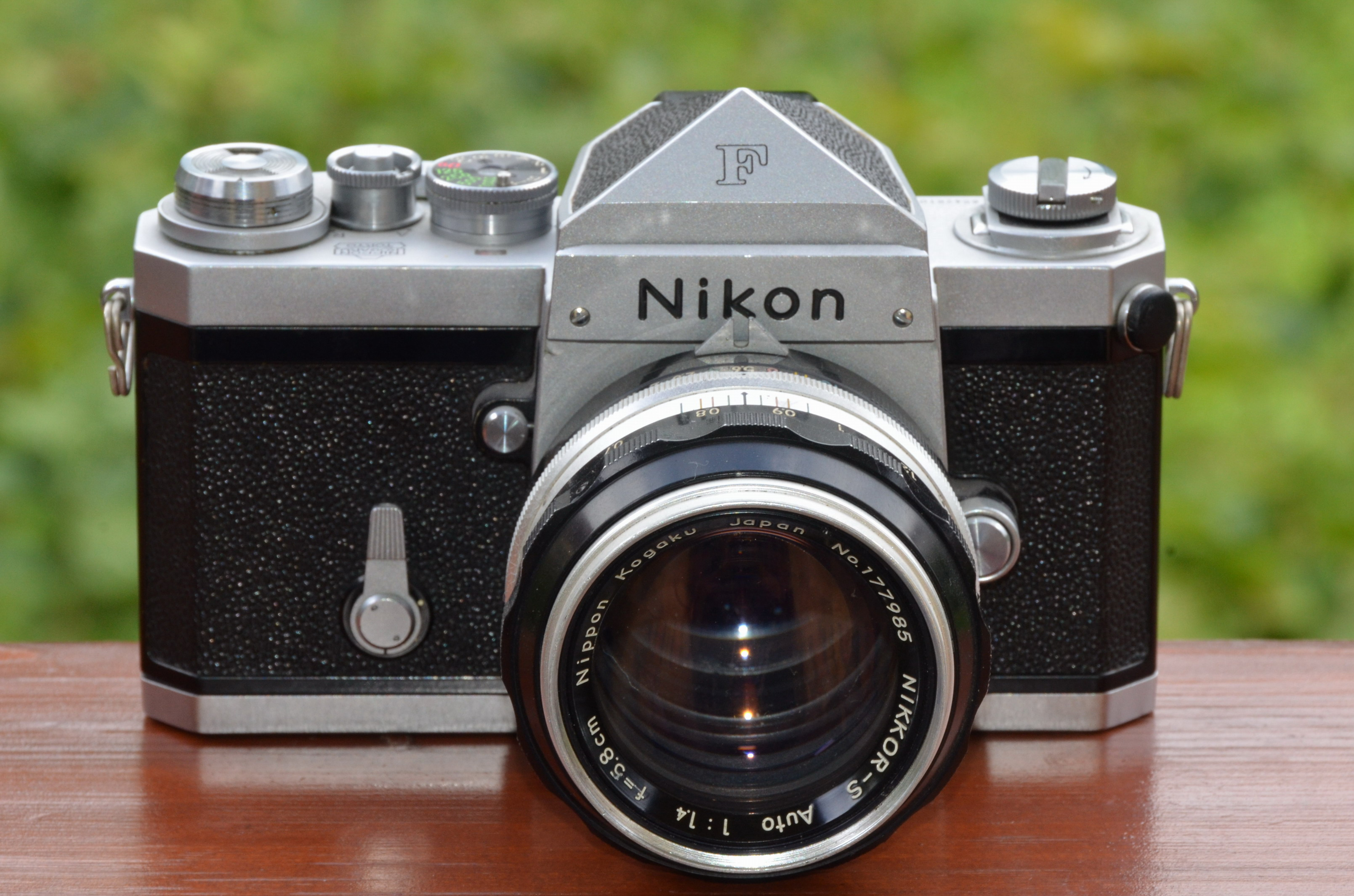
Nikon F professional SLR camera with eyelevel prism and early NIKKOR-S Auto 1:1,4 f=5,8cm (1959)

The Nikon F was the first 35 mm SLR system to be widely adopted by professional photographers, especially photojournalists covering the Vietnam War, as well as for use by NASA astronauts.

It was originally priced at US$186 with 50 mm f/2 lens; in November 1963 the US price was $233 for the body with a standard prism plus $90 for a 50 mm f/2 lens or $155 for a 50 mm f/1.4.

A combination of design elements made the Nikon F successful. It had interchangeable prisms and focusing screens; the camera had a depth-of-field preview button; the mirror had lock-up capability; it had a large bayonet mount and a large lens release button; a single-stroke ratcheted film advance lever; a titanium-foil focal plane shutter; various types of flash synchronization; a rapid rewind lever; a fully removable back. It was well-made, durable, and adhered closely to the successful design scheme of the Nikon rangefinder cameras. The camera was the first to use the F-mount bayonet lens mount system, which is still used as of 2026. Lead designer of the Nikon F was Yusaku Kamekura, the man behind the 1964 Summer Olympics logo.

The Nikon F evolved from a rangefinder camera, the Nikon SP. The prototype model, in particular, was an SP with a mirror box, pentaprism and larger lens mount grafted on.

The Nikon F revolutionized the photographic market, stealing the thunder of German manufacturers Leica and Zeiss. The F had a reputation for being extremely resilient to damage or mechanical failure, becoming known as "the hockey puck."

In some markets, the camera was marketed as a "Nikkor F" due to trademark conflicts. In Germany, "Nikon" was seen as too similar to the Zeiss Ikon camera line. Nikkor F cameras have become collector's items.

The Nikon F was succeeded in 1972 by the Nikon F2 series after a production total of 862,600 bodies. Subsequent "single-digit" F cameras continued as the top of Nikon's professional line of film SLRs, through the Nikon F6 introduced in 2004. Since the introduction of the digital Nikon D1 in 1999, Nikon has continued to reserve single-digit model numbers for top-of-the-line cameras.

== Design ==
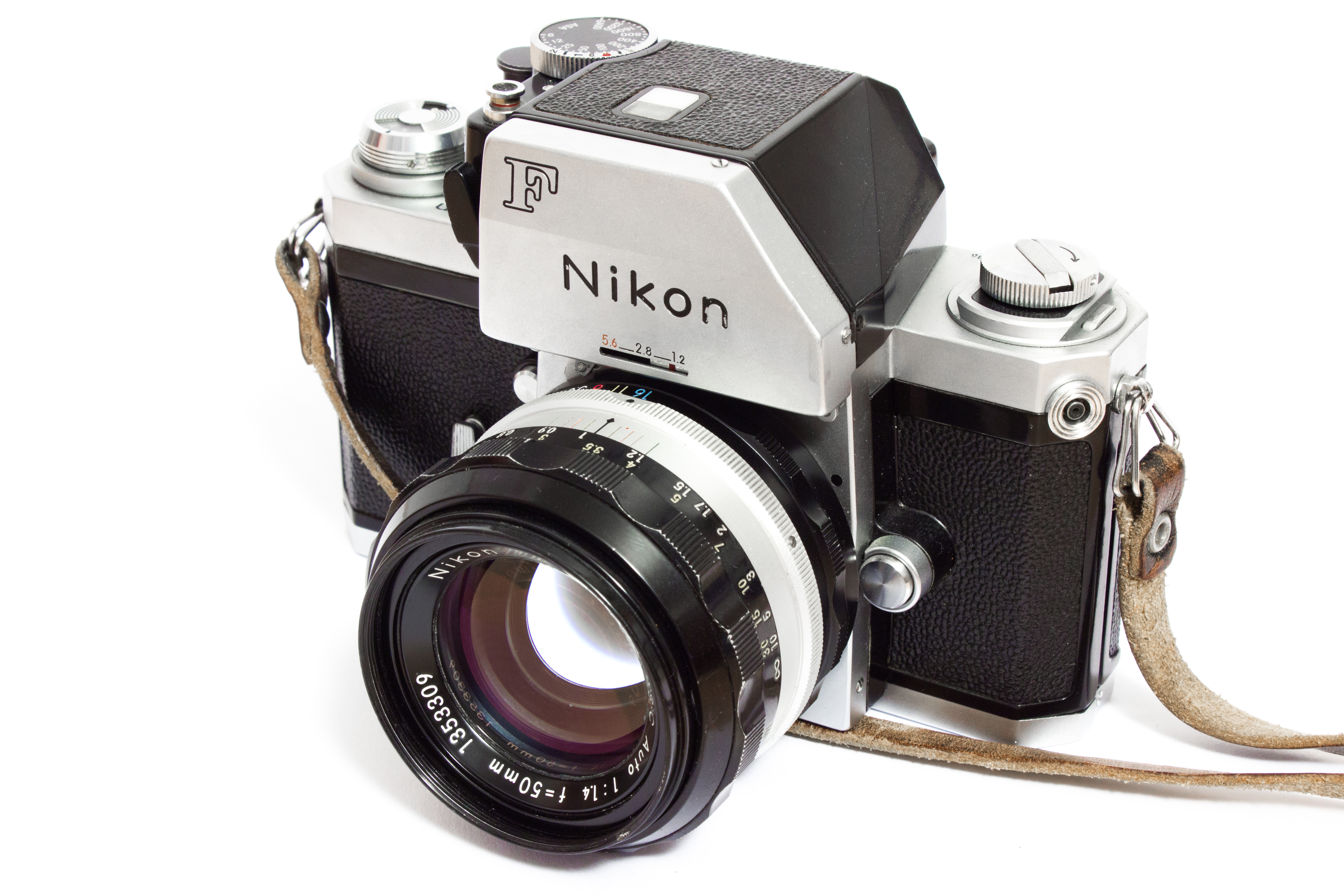
Nikon F with Photomic FTn metering finder

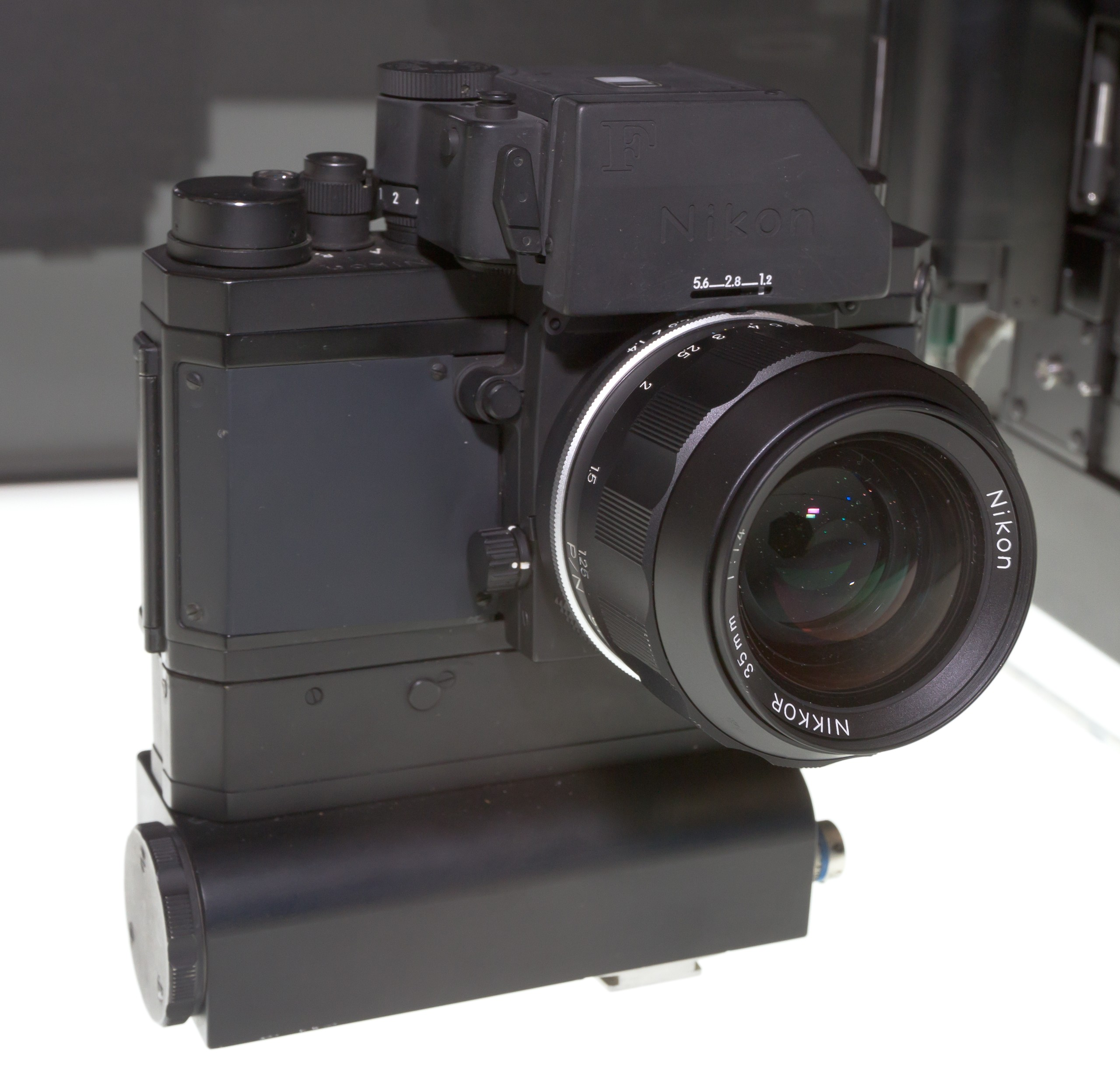
Apollo 15 (NASA) Nikon F with FTn Photomic prism and motor drive, usable for extra-vehicular activity. The first 35 mm SLR in lunar orbit.

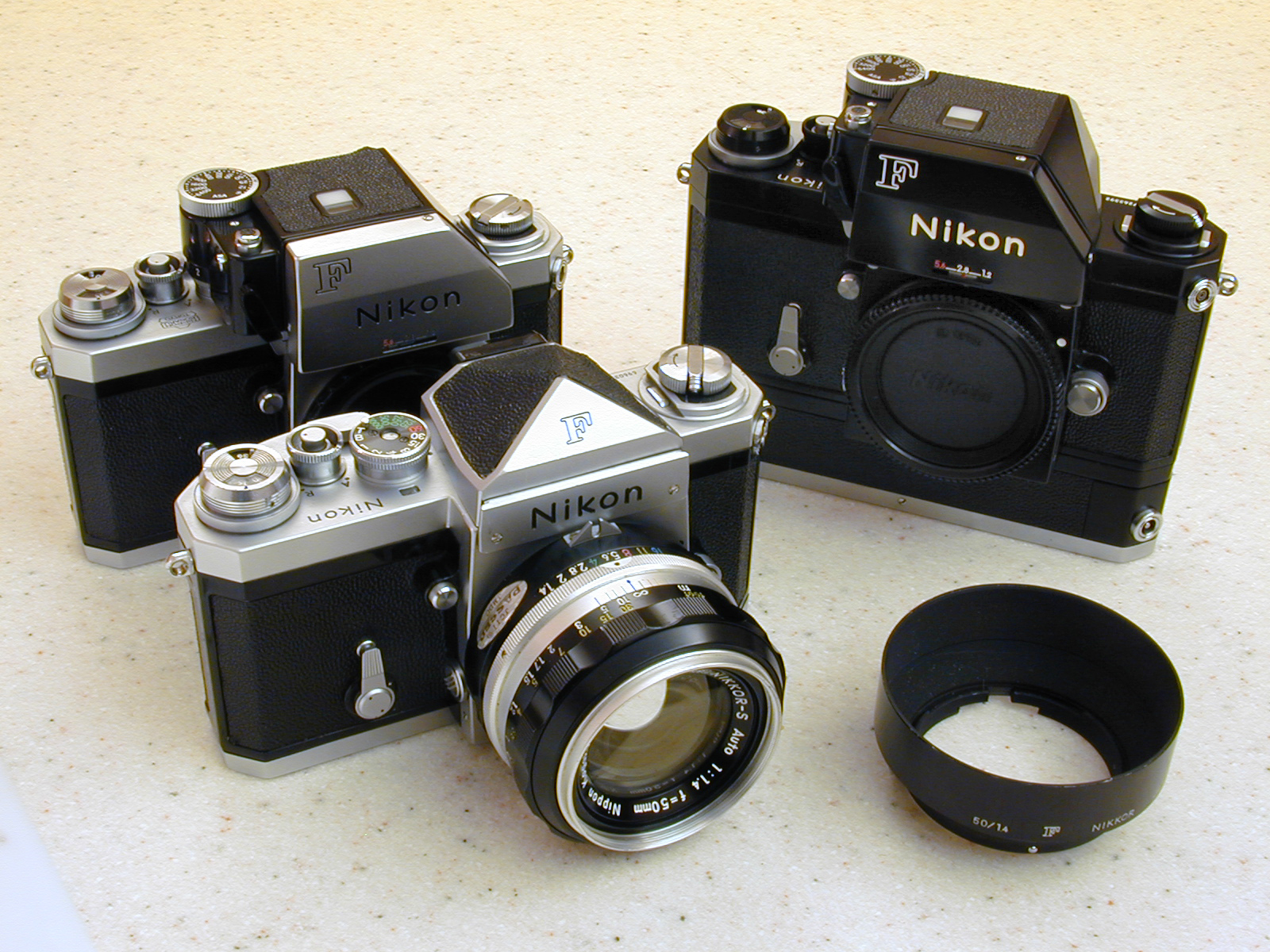
Foreground: Nikon F with eyelevel prism; Rear, left: Nikon F with FTn Photomic prism; Rear, right: Nikon F with FTn Photomic prism and F36 motor drive

The F was a modular system camera, with various assemblies such as viewfinders, focusing screens, and motor drives for 36-exposure and 250-exposure film cassettes. Third parties manufactured other film backs, such as two Speed Magny film backs—one using Polaroid 100 (later 600) type pack films, and another designed for 4x5 film accessories including Polaroid's own 4x5 instant film back. Each of these assemblies could be fitted and removed, allowing the camera to adapt to almost any task. The F36 motor drive, one of the first popular motor drives for SLR cameras, was capable of firing up to 4 frames per second with the mirror locked up or 3 frames per second with full reflex viewing maintained.

=== Lenses ===
The Nikon F had a wide range of lenses, covering 21 mm to 1000 mm focal length by 1962. Nikon was among the first companies to manufacture Catadioptric system lens designs, combining mirrors and lenses to make more-compact lenses with longer focal lengths.

=== Viewfinders ===
The first Nikon F Photomic viewfinder, delivered since 1962, had an independent photocell. Then Nikon introduced the Photomic T (superseded by the Photomic Tn), which featured through-the-lens (TTL) metering. The final metering prism for the Nikon F, the Photomic FTn, introduced in 1968, provided 60% center-weighted TTL, which became the standard metering pattern for Nikon cameras for decades afterwards. Additional viewfinders included a waist-level viewer, a 6 power magnifying finder, and an "action finder" with a larger viewable area through which one could see the entire frame while wearing goggles and/or a helmet.

=== Focusing screens ===
Nikon focusing screen types
Type	Image	Field	Center focusing aid	Notes
A		Ground matte Fresnel	Horizontal split-image rangefinder, 3 mm diameter	12 mm circle reference for center-weighted meter; compare with Types K, L. On early versions, the 12 mm circle was a fine-ground matte screen, similar to Type B.
B		Ground matte Fresnel	Fine-ground matte, 12 mm diameter	Similar to Type A but omitting split-image; also compare with Type J
C		Fine-ground matte, plain	Clear, 4 mm diameter + cross hair	Uses parallax focusing
D		Fine-ground matte, plain	—	
E		Ground matte Fresnel	Fine-ground matte, 12 mm diameter	Etched grid lines, compare with Type R
F		Ground matte Fresnel	Fine-ground matte, 12 mm diameter + microprism, 5.5 mm diameter	Intended for slower lenses; compare with Types B, J
G1 / G2 / G3 / G4		Clear Fresnel	Microprism, 12 mm diameter	Specific model selected according to focal length
H1 / H2 / H3 / H4		Clear Fresnel	Microprism, overall; Fresnel-free center spot	Specific model selected according to focal length
J		Ground matte Fresnel	Microprism, 4 mm diameter	12 mm circle reference for center-weighted meter
K		Ground matte Fresnel	Horizontal split-image rangefinder, 3 mm diameter + microprism collar, 1 mm thick	12 mm circle reference for center-weighted meter; combination of Types A and J
L		Ground matte Fresnel	Diagonal split-image rangefinder, 3 mm diameter	12 mm circle reference for center-weighted meter; compare with Types A, P
M		Ground matte Fresnel	Clear, 5.5 mm diameter + double cross-hair	Vertical and horizontal scales ruled at 1 mm
P		Ground matte Fresnel	Diagonal split-image rangefinder, 3 mm diameter + microprism collar, 1 mm thick	12 mm circle reference for center-weighted meter, etched horizontal and vertical lines; compare with Types K, L
R		Ground matte Fresnel	Horizontal split-image rangefinder, 3 mm diameter	Etched grid lines, compare with Type E; prisms at shallower angle than Type A, intended for slower lenses (maximum aperture > f/2.8).
T (TV)		Ground matte Fresnel	Horizontal split-image rangefinder, 3 mm diameter	12 mm circle reference for center-weighted meter, etched lines for broadcast television aspect ratio (4:3)

Selection of G1/G2/G3/G4 and H1/H2/H3/H4 should be determined by the specific lens being used, but the following general observations can be made:

- G1 / H1: Use with focal lengths ≤ 50 mm for slower lenses (maximum aperture ≥ f/2)
- G2 / H2: Use with focal lengths ≤ 200 mm
- G3 / H3: Use with focal lengths ≥ 180 mm
- G4 / H4: Use with focal lengths ≥ 600 mm

== Noted users ==
Notable users of the Nikon F include:

- British photojournalist Don McCullin, whose Nikon F stopped a bullet potentially saving his life.

== Gallery ==
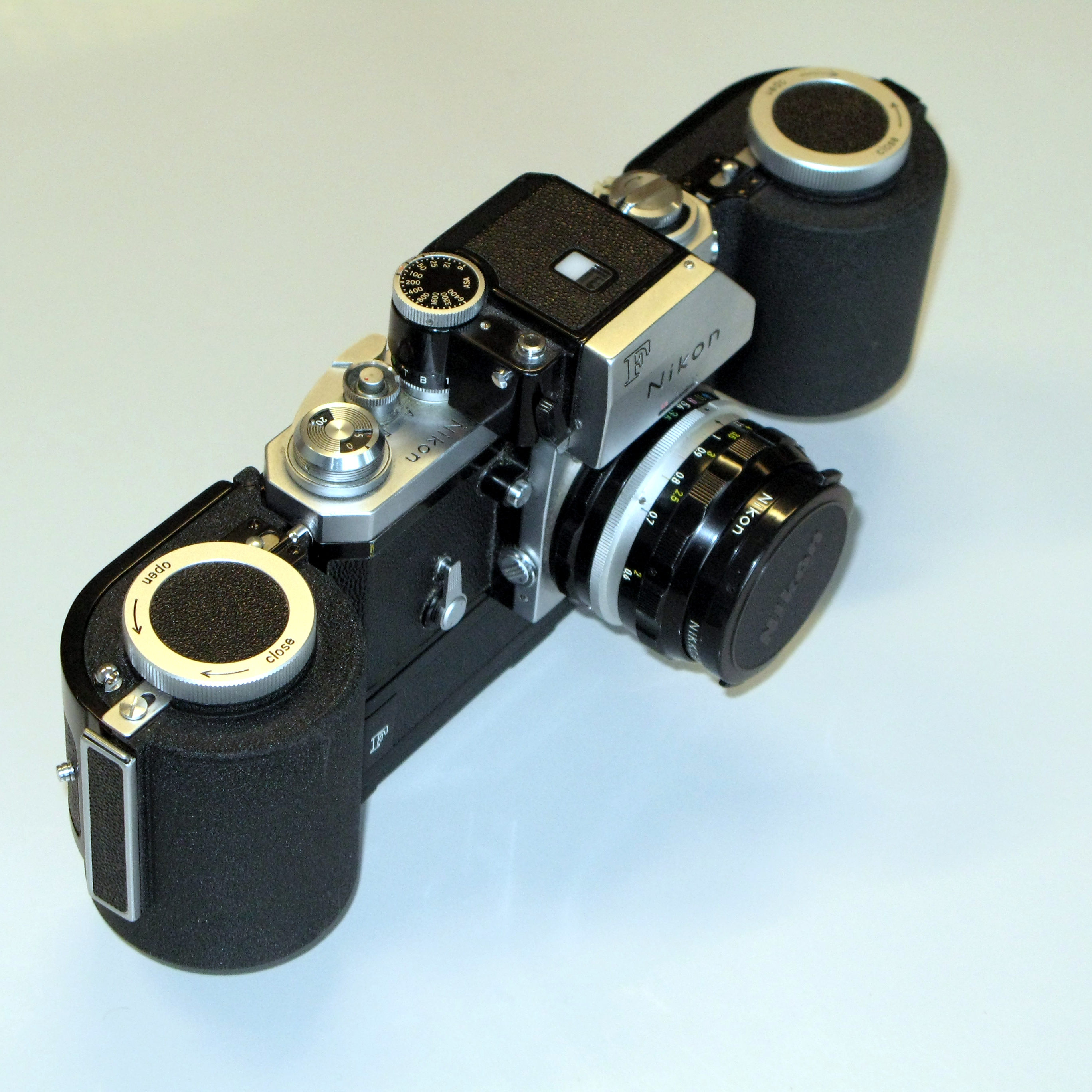
High capacity back for 30 feet (10 metres) of bulk film with the F250 motor drive

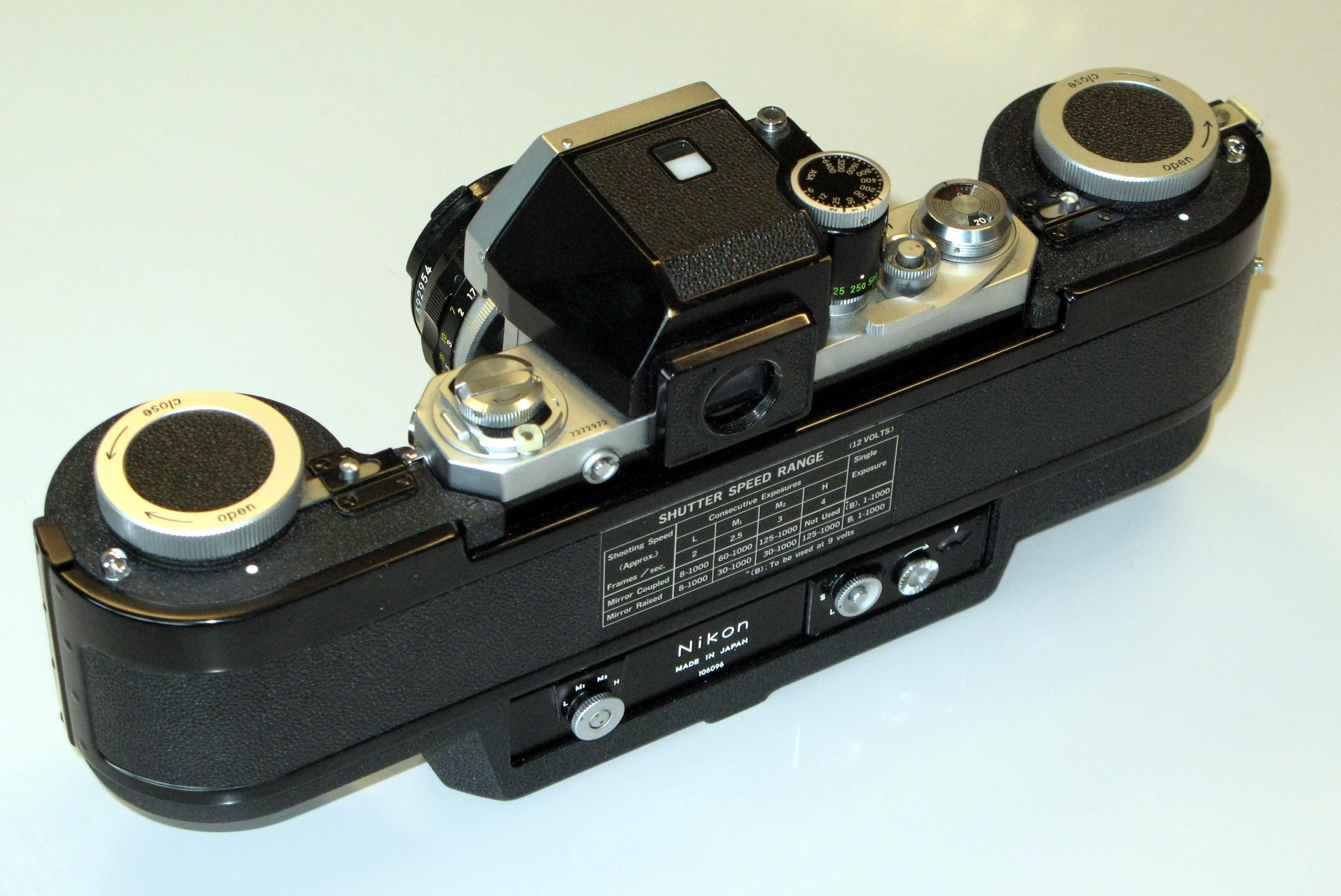
F250 motor drive, as mounted (rear view)

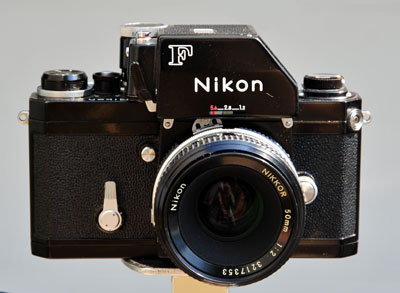
Nikon FTN with interchangeable photomic TTL metering prism

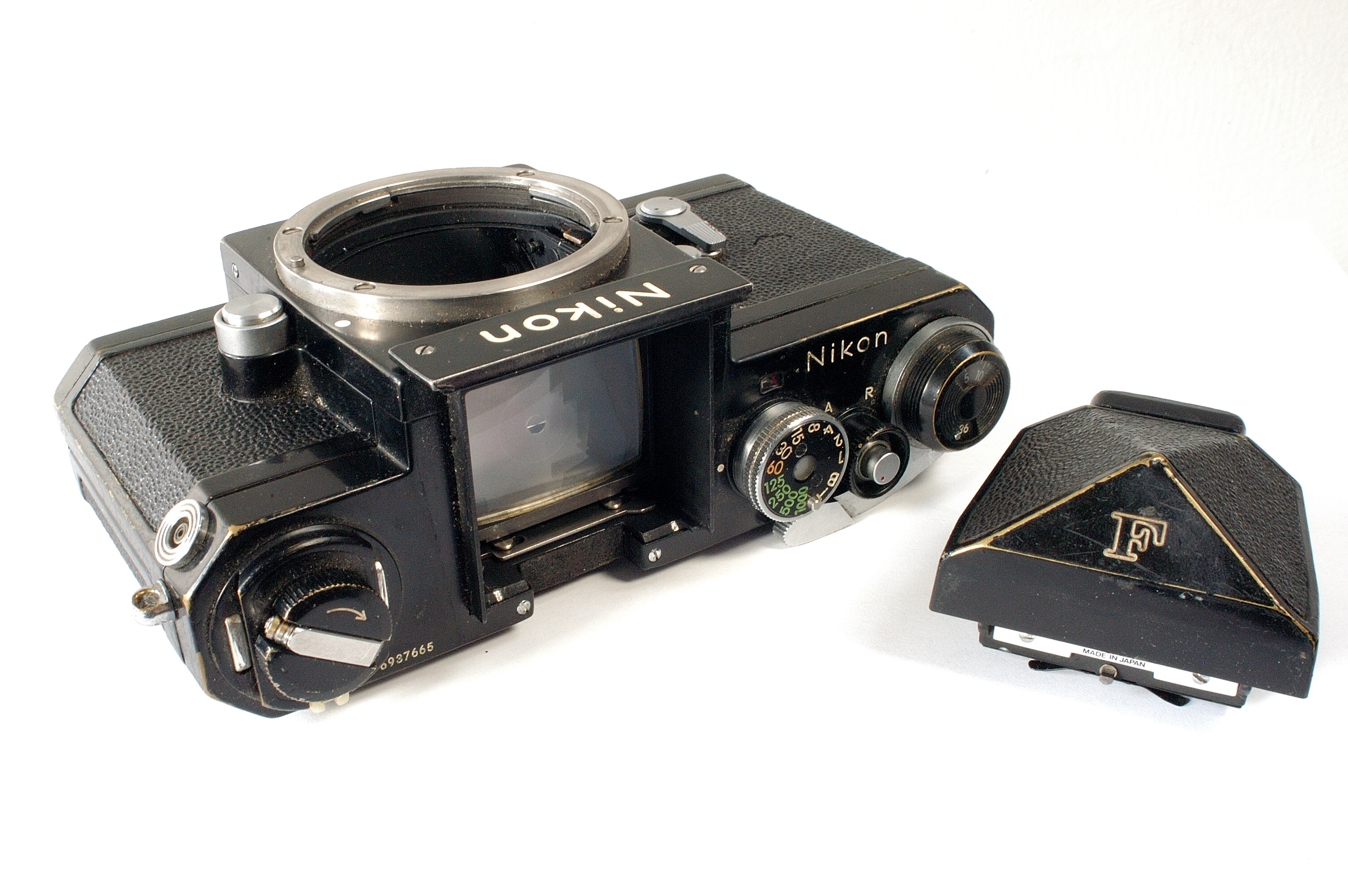
A Nikon F body with detached pentaprism viewfinder, showing the focusing screen

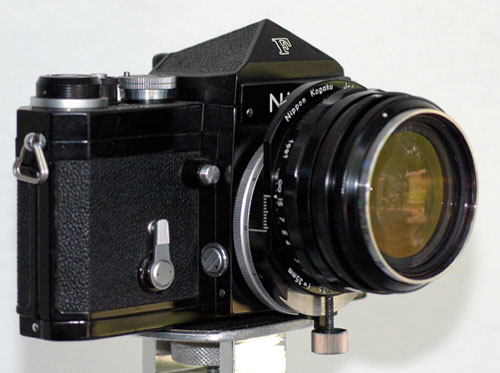
The first 35mm perspective control lens was introduced in 1961 for the Nikon F

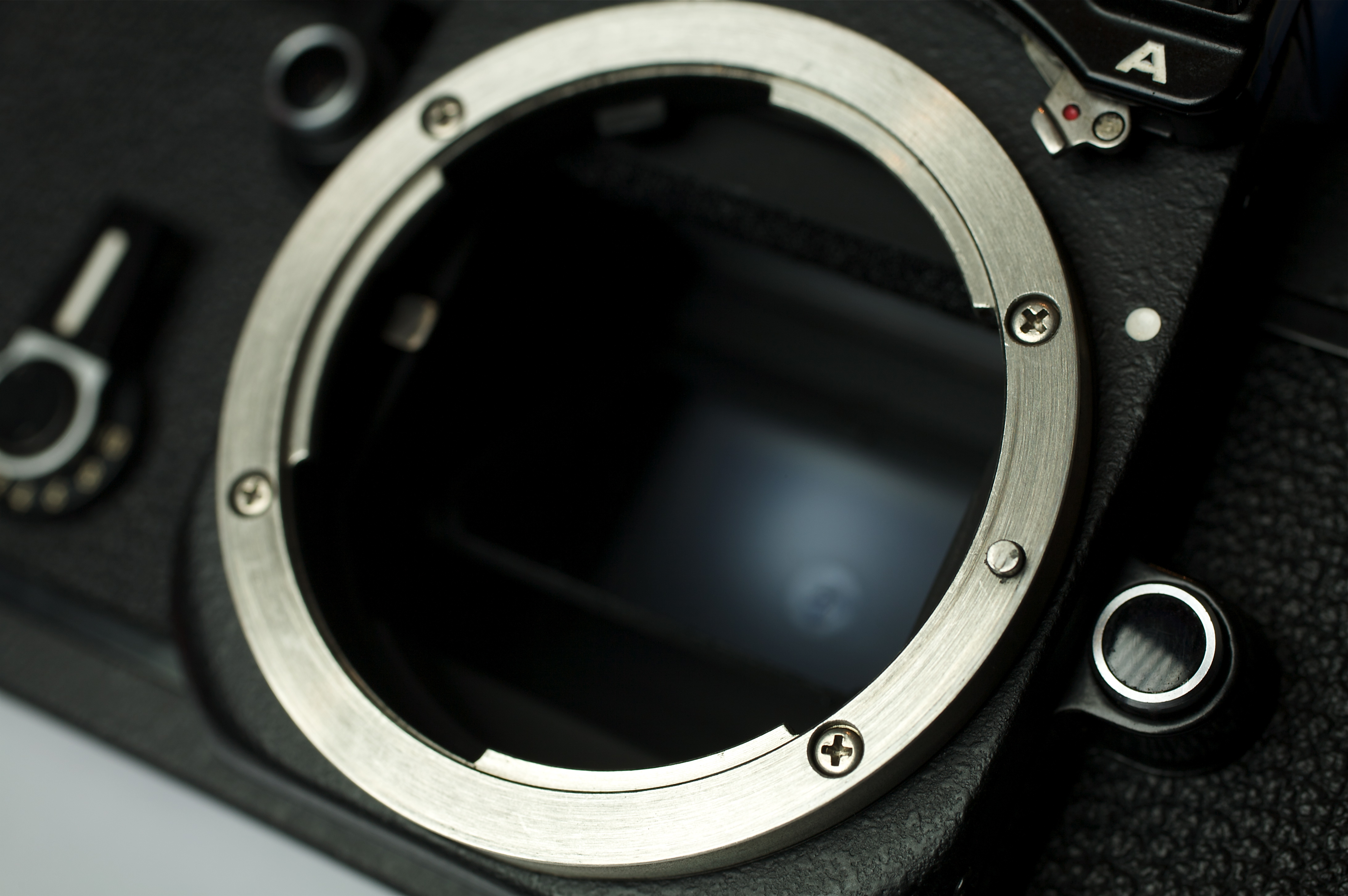
the Nikon F bayonet mount

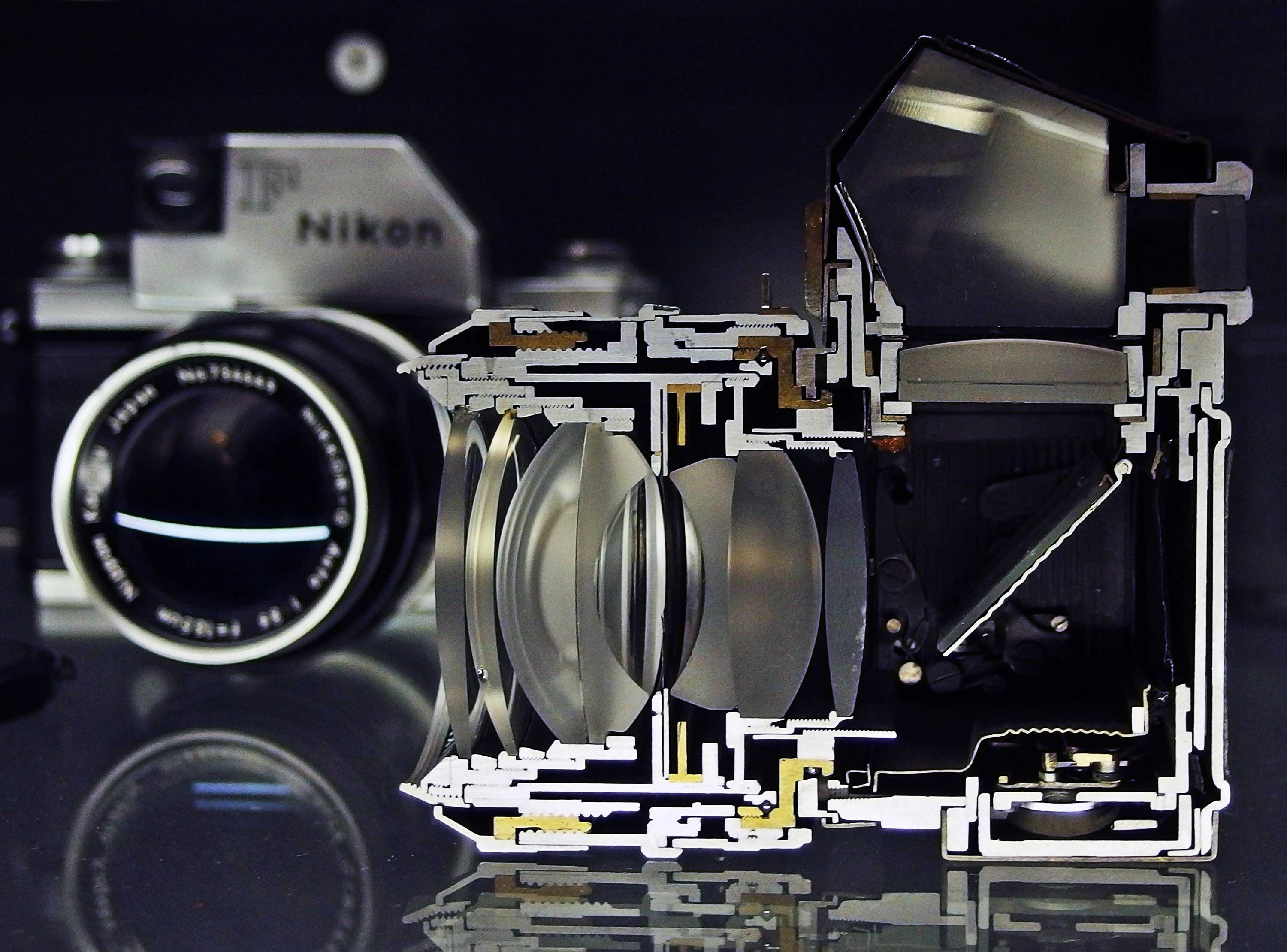
A cutaway view of a Nikon F

== See also ==
- 135 film
- Nikon SP
- History of the single-lens reflex camera
- Pentaprism
- System camera

Class	1950s					1960s										1970s										1980s										1990s										2000s										2020s			
Class	55	56	57	58	59	60	61	62	63	64	65	66	67	68	69	70	71	72	73	74	75	76	77	78	79	80	81	82	83	84	85	86	87	88	89	90	91	92	93	94	95	96	97	98	99	00	01	02	03	04	05	06	07	08	09	...	20	21	22
Professional					F																					F3																																	
Professional																	F2												F3AF					F4								F5								F6									
High-end																													FA					F-801 (N8008)/ F-801s (N8008s)				F90 (N90)		F90X (N90s)					F100														
Mid-range																																F-501 (N2020)				F-601 (N6006)				F70 (N70)						F80 (N80)													
Mid-range																		EL / EL2 /ELW						FE					FE2							F-601M (N6000)				F70 (N70)						F80 (N80)													
Mid-range											FT		FTn/ FT2/ FT3										FM					FM2/FM2n																			FM3A												
Mid-range											FS												FM					FM2/FM2n																			FM3A												
Entry-level																																																											
Entry-level																																										Pronea S																	
Entry-level																																									Pronea 600i/6i																		
Entry-level								Nikkorex F / Nikkor J																	EM			FG			F-301 (N2000)				F-401s (N4004s)					F50 (N50)							F65 (N65 / U)		F75 (N75 / U2)										
Entry-level						35		35 II		Auto 35																				FG-20			F-401 (N4004)				F-401x (N5005)								F60 (N60)			F55 (N55)											
Entry-level									Zoom 35																																FM10 / FE10																		
Class	55	56	57	58	59	60	61	62	63	64	65	66	67	68	69	70	71	72	73	74	75	76	77	78	79	80	81	82	83	84	85	86	87	88	89	90	91	92	93	94	95	96	97	98	99	00	01	02	03	04	05	06	07	08	09	...	20	21	22
Class	1950s					1960s										1970s										1980s										1990s										2000s										2020s			
