= D1X =

D1X may refer to:

- Nikon D1X, a digital single-lens reflex camera
- a source port of the computer game Descent
