= ILCE =

ILCE may refer to:

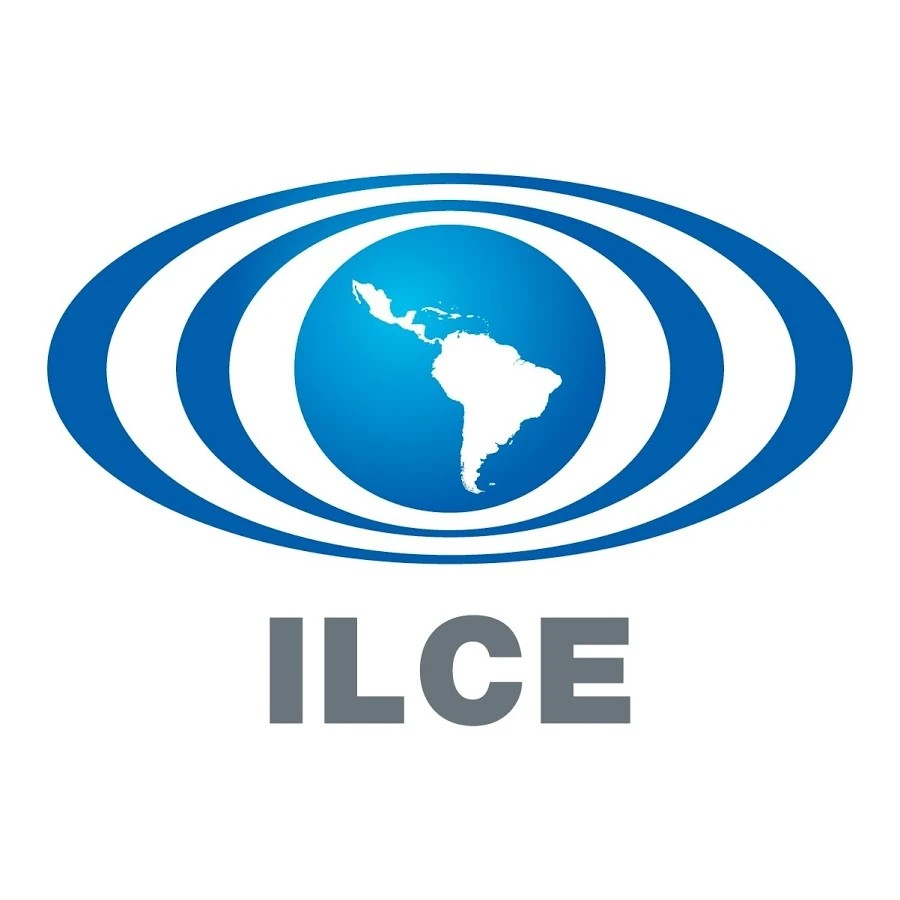

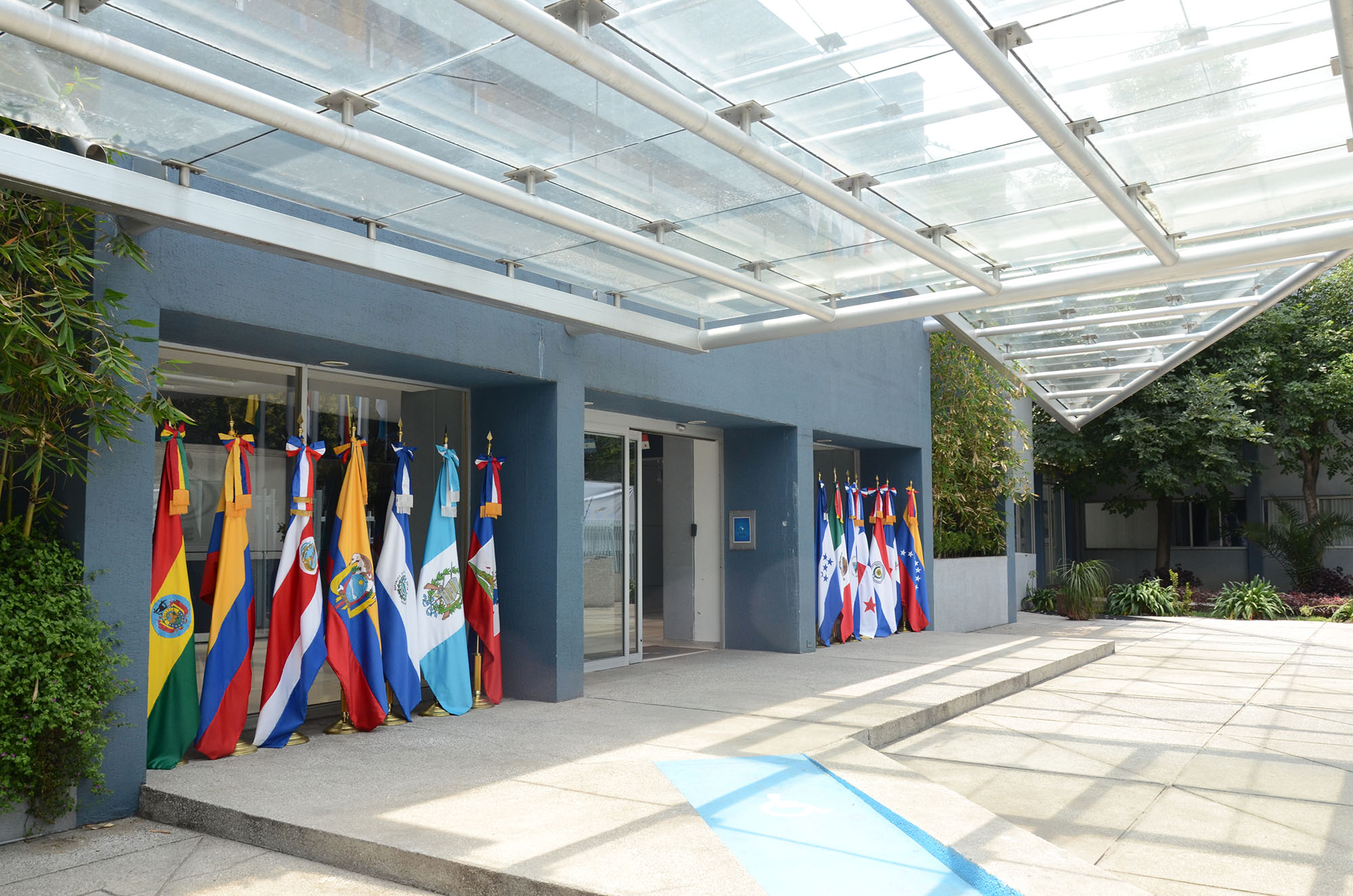

- Instituto Latinoamericano de la Comunicación Educativa, (ILCE) the Latin American Institute of Educational Communication in Mexico.
- Sony ILCE camera, a designation used by Sony since 2013 for mirrorless interchangeable-lens digital system cameras with E-mount
- İlçe, a district, a subdivision of a province (il) in Turkey

== See also ==
- ILC (disambiguation)
- ILCA (disambiguation)
