= The Union Credit Union =

- Company type: Credit union
- Industry: Financial services
- Founded: 1968
- Headquarters: Spokane, Washington, United States
- Products: Savings; checking; consumer loans; mortgages; credit cards; online banking
- Website: theunioncreditunion.com

The Union Credit Union was a credit union chartered to serve union members. A national advocate for unions and union members, it was headquartered in Spokane, Washington, United States. It closed operations in October 2010.

In 1968 members of Bricklayers Local 3 founded The Union Credit Union as a not-for-profit means of obtaining loans and saving money. The credit union served only trade union members and was named Inland Empire Trades Credit Union. Today members from any union can belong and bank at The Union Credit Union. The families of union members, union employers and unions could also hold accounts and obtain loans at The Union Credit Union.

The Union Credit Union received media attention in 2008 for a series of advertisements using the phrase "It just works for me" without a logo or name attached.

== Advocacy ==
The credit union's mission was to provide union members with a not-for-profit banking alternative. The Union Credit Union was the only remaining credit union in the United States run by an all union staff, board and management. The credit union had positioned itself as an advocate against union-affiliated credit unions merging into community chartered credit unions resulting in the loss of services to union members.

== Employees ==
The Union Credit Union had an all union staff, an all union volunteer board of directors, and the CEO was also a union member. Demaris Krummel was the CEO of The Union Credit Union.

== Services ==
The Union Credit Union allowed union members to skip loan payments during difficult times, including union strike. Members could obtain Step-Up Loans for tools, job training or college. The credit union also handled payroll for union shops.

== Partnerships ==
The Union Credit Union had partnerships with the following unions to serve their members:

- Washington State Labor Council
- Asbestos Workers Local 82
- Bricklayers Local 3 (Spokane/Montana)
- Carpenters Local 98
- Cement Masons
- Communications Workers of America Local 7818
- Plumbers and Pipefitters Local 44
- Roofers Local 189
- Sheet Metal Workers Local 66
- Inland Northwest Apprenticeship Coordinators Council
- Inland Northwest Electrical Training Trust
- Spokane Regional Labor Council
- Washington Federation of State Employees
- United Steelworkers of America

== Grant program ==
The Step-Up Program was a consumer financial education and workforce development program to help the 2.7 million union workers in Washington state to take the next step up in life. Below market rate, not-for-profit Step-Up Loans were offered to union workers at their place of employment and union halls. The loans were used to cultivate new skills and obtain tools that supported workforce development.

The program was conceptualized from the historical writings of Edward Filene’s vision in founding both unions and credit unions in the United States to serve the employees of Filene's Department Store. Filene was an advocate for workers' rights and supported his staff in collective bargaining. He also was a founder of the Chamber of Commerce - understanding what was good for employees was also good for business.

== See also ==
- AFL-CIO Employees Federal Credit Union
- Amalgamated Bank of Chicago
