= Nikon F5 =

1996 35mm single-lens reflex camera

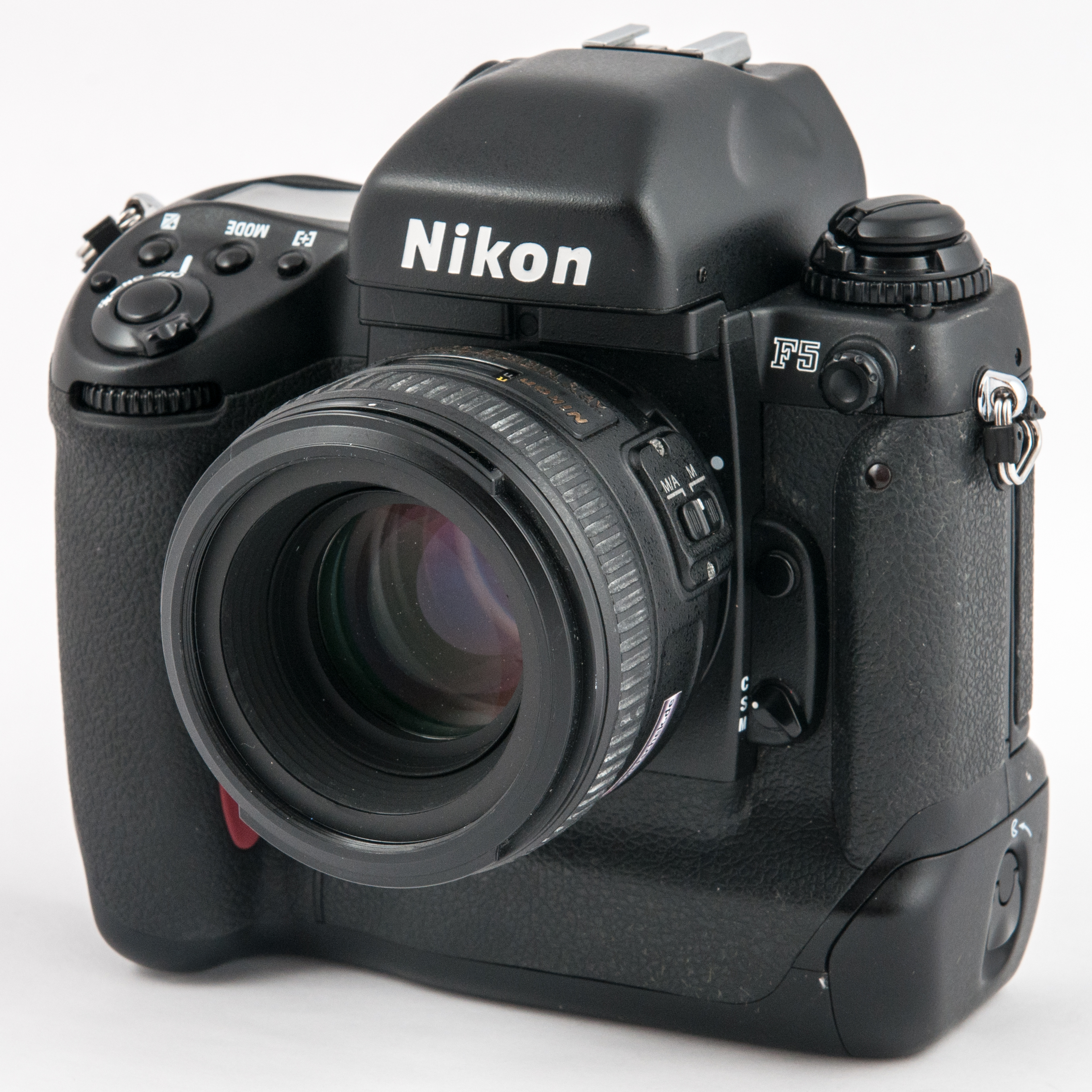

Overview
- Maker: Nikon
- Type: 35 mm SLR
- Released: 1996
- Production: 1996-2004

Lens
- Lens mount: Nikon F-mount
- Lens: Nikon F-mount

Sensor/medium
- Film format: 35mm
- Film size: 36mm x 24mm
- Film speed: Auto DX(ISO 25-5000), Manual (ISO 6-6400)
- Film speed detection: Yes
- Film advance: 8 frame/s

Focusing
- Focus modes: AF-S, AF-C, Manual
- Focus areas: TTL Phase Detection Autofocus 5-zone

Exposure/metering
- Exposure modes: Program, shutter priority, aperture priority, manual
- Exposure metering: 1005-pixel RGB sensor
- Metering modes: 3D Matrix, Center-weighted, Spot

Flash
- Flash synchronization: 1/300s

Shutter
- Shutter: Lithium niobate oscillator controlled vertical focal plane shutter; Electromagnetic Bulb Setting
- Shutter speed range: 30s to 1/8000s in 1/3 steps
- Continuous shooting: 8 frame/s

Viewfinder
- Optional viewfinders: DA-30 Action finder, DW-31 High-mag finder, DW-30 Waist-level finder
- Viewfinder magnification: 0.70x
- Frame coverage: 100%

General
- Battery: 8x AA battery, option MN-30 NiMH battery
- Optional data backs: Multi control back MF-28 and Data back MF-27
- Dimensions: 158×149×79 mm (6.2×5.9×3.1 in)
- Weight: 1,210 g without batteries nor film
- Made in: Japan

Chronology
- Successor: Nikon F6

The Nikon F5 is a professional 35 mm film-based single-lens reflex camera body manufactured by Nikon from 1996 through 2004. It was the fifth in Nikon's professional film camera line, which began in 1959 with the Nikon F. It followed the Nikon F4 of 1988, which introduced in-body autofocus to Nikon's professional line. The F5 was in turn succeeded by the Nikon F6, as well as Nikon's parallel range of professional digital SLRs, beginning with the Nikon D1.

== Design ==
Important advances in the F5 included:

- Nikon 3-D color matrix meter (the F4 had introduced multi-segment matrix metering to the F series, but color sensing was new).
- A self-diagnostic and self-adjusting shutter.
- A mirror-balance system that reduced camera shake.
- Electronically controlled exposure times from 1/8000 second to 30 seconds.
- Built-in 8 frame per second motor drive (up from 5.7 frame/s on the F4).
- 1/300 second flash sync (up from 1/250 on the F4). However, at 1/300 second, flash units could not use their full capacity.
- Full support for Nikkor AF-S and G designated lenses (the F4 could not use G lenses in aperture-priority or full manual modes).
- Support for the Vibration Reduction (VR) image stabilization feature of newer Nikkor lenses.
- Five focus points for the autofocus sensor (up from one on the F4) with intelligent dynamic autofocus mode.
- A new industrial design by Giorgetto Giugiaro (also designer of the F3 and F4).
- An integral vertical/battery grip with additional shutter release and adjustment wheel controls (previous Nikon F models had used a range of removable battery grips).

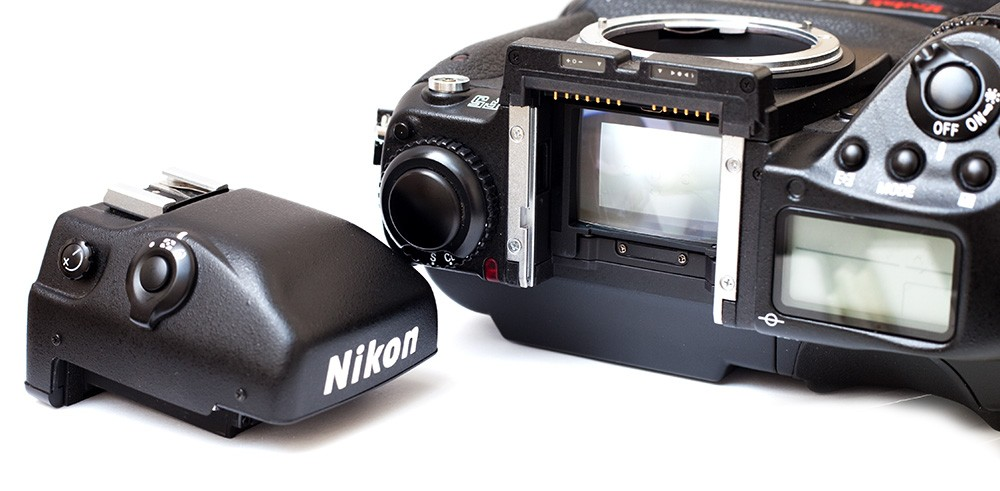
The Nikon F5's standard DP-30 metering prism

Like all previous Nikon F series cameras, the F5 maintained a manual film rewind (with a rapid power rewind built in), high durability, exceptionally short shutter lag, interchangeable 100% coverage viewfinders (including a large-view Action Finder, Waist-Level Finder, and 6x High-Magnification Finder, in addition to the stock DP-30 multi-metering pentaprism), and support for a wide range of Nikon F-mount lenses. In common with the F3 and F4 it relied upon battery power in order to function, either from eight AA batteries or an optional rechargeable NiMH battery pack.

It was discontinued in 2004 as it was facing tough competition from its competitors.

== Variants ==
=== F5 50th anniversary edition ===
Nikon introduced a very limited production anniversary edition of the F5 to celebrate 50 years of Nippon Kogaku (Japanese Optical). It featured a titanium colored top plate, a grey handgrip instead of red, and a special DP-30 metering prism with its historic "Nikon" font. On the reverse is the original Nippon Kogaku trademark logo and a stylized "50" beneath it. Approximately 3,000 were made for the global market. They were quickly sold around the world by collectors who saw the F5 as the last of the true professional grade film SLRs by Nikon.

=== Kodak digital camera conversions ===
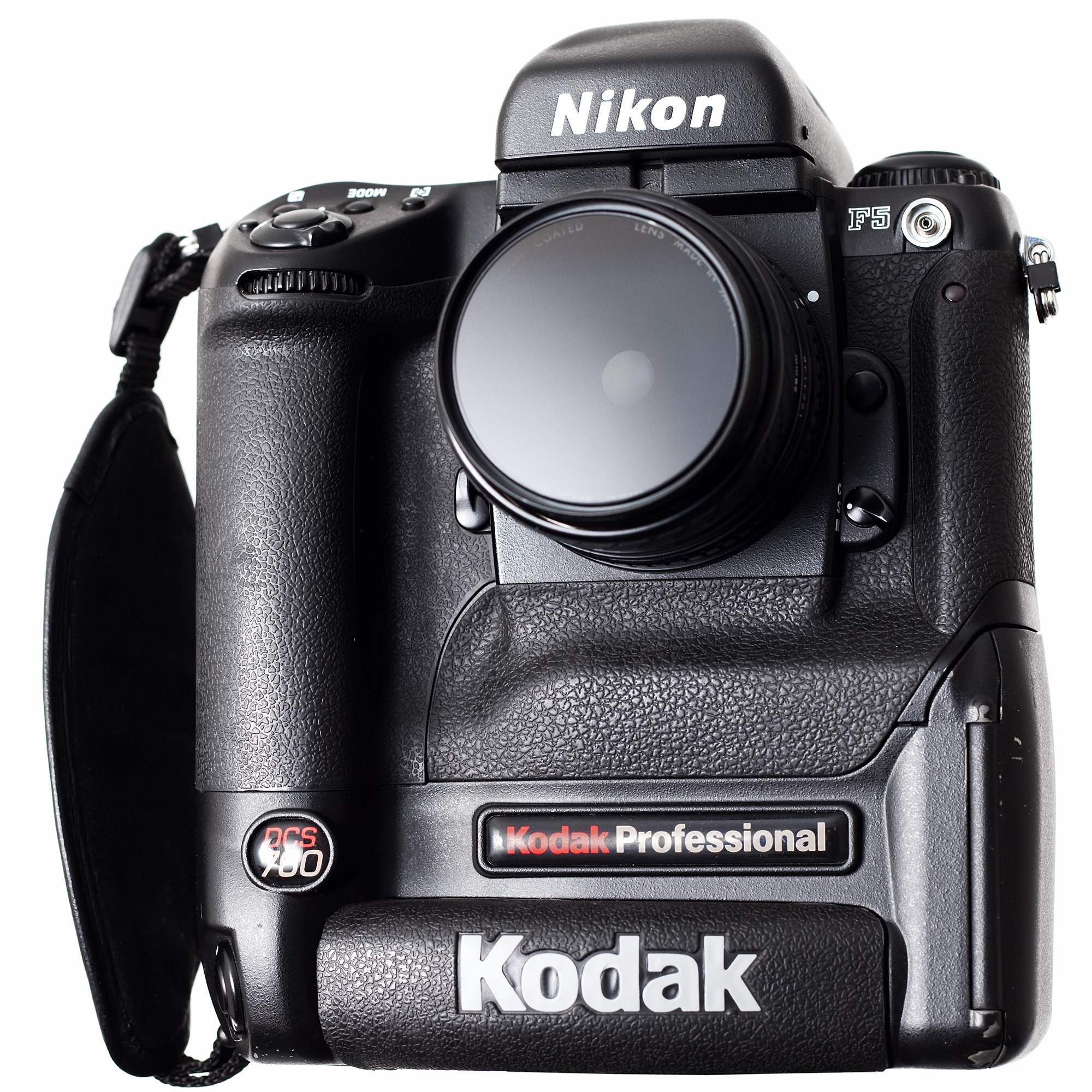
A Kodak DCS 760, a 6 megapixel digital SLR based on a Nikon F5 body

During the late 1990s, Nikon and Kodak collaborated on a range of professional digital SLRs which combined Nikon bodies with Kodak digital sensors and electronics. The initial range was based around the semi-professional Nikon F90, but the later Kodak DCS 600 and DCS 700 models were based on the Nikon F5. On a physical level they consisted of a Nikon F5 with the film transport equipment replaced with a custom-made Kodak digital back. The digital back extended beneath the camera to house the battery and a pair of PCMCIA card slots.

The Kodak DCS 600 series was launched in 1999, and initially consisted of the 2 megapixel Kodak DCS 620 and the 6 megapixel DCS 660, which had an initial launch price of $29,995. The DCS 600 series was continued in 2000 with the Kodak DCS 620x, a high-sensitivity model with an upgraded indium tin oxide sensor and a cyan-magenta-yellow Bayer filter, which had a then-unique top ISO setting of ISO 6400.

Kodak replaced the 600 series with the upgraded DCS 700 series in 2001, which consisted of the high-sensitivity DCS 720x and the 6 megapixel DCS 760. By 2001 Kodak faced competition from the popular Nikon D1 and Nikon D1x, which were physically smaller and cheaper. The DCS 760's initial list price was $8,000.

== In popular culture ==
The Nikon F5 has appeared in several motion pictures and television productions. Notable examples include Vertical Limit (2000), where the camera is used by a climber-photographer in high-altitude Pakistan; The Edge (1997), and The Lost World: Jurassic Park (1997), in which characters portrayed by Julianne Moore and Vince Vaughn use the F5 and F100 to document dinosaurs in the jungle. The camera also features in the French film La Fidélité (2000), where it is carried by a tabloid photographer, and in The Score (2001), where Robert De Niro’s character uses it for surveillance photography.

Class	1950s			1960s										1970s										1980s										1990s										2000s										2020s			
Class	57	58	59	60	61	62	63	64	65	66	67	68	69	70	71	72	73	74	75	76	77	78	79	80	81	82	83	84	85	86	87	88	89	90	91	92	93	94	95	96	97	98	99	00	01	02	03	04	05	06	07	08	09	...	20	21	22
Profes- sional			F																					F3																																	
Profes- sional															F2												F3AF					F4								F5								F6									
High- end																											FA					F-801 (N8008)/ F-801s (N8008s)				F90 (N90)		F90X (N90s)					F100														
Mid- range																														F-501 (N2020)				F-601 (N6006)				F70 (N70)						F80 (N80)													
Mid- range																EL / EL2 /ELW						FE					FE2							F-601M (N6000)				F70 (N70)						F80 (N80)													
Mid- range									FT		FTn/ FT2/ FT3										FM					FM2/FM2n																			FM3A												
Mid- range									FS												FM					FM2/FM2n																			FM3A												
Entry- level																																																									
Entry- level																																								Pronea 600i/6i																	
Entry- level																																										Pronea S															
Entry- level						Nikkorex F / Nikkor J																	EM			FG			F-301 (N2000)				F-401s (N4004s)					F50 (N50)							F65 (N65 / U)		F75 (N75 / U2)										
Entry- level				35		35 II		Auto 35																				FG-20			F-401 (N4004)				F-401x (N5005)								F60 (N60)			F55 (N55)											
Entry- level							Zoom 35																																FM10 / FE10																		
Class	57	58	59	60	61	62	63	64	65	66	67	68	69	70	71	72	73	74	75	76	77	78	79	80	81	82	83	84	85	86	87	88	89	90	91	92	93	94	95	96	97	98	99	00	01	02	03	04	05	06	07	08	09	...	20	21	22
Class	1950s			1960s										1970s										1980s										1990s										2000s										2020s			
