= Nikon F100 =

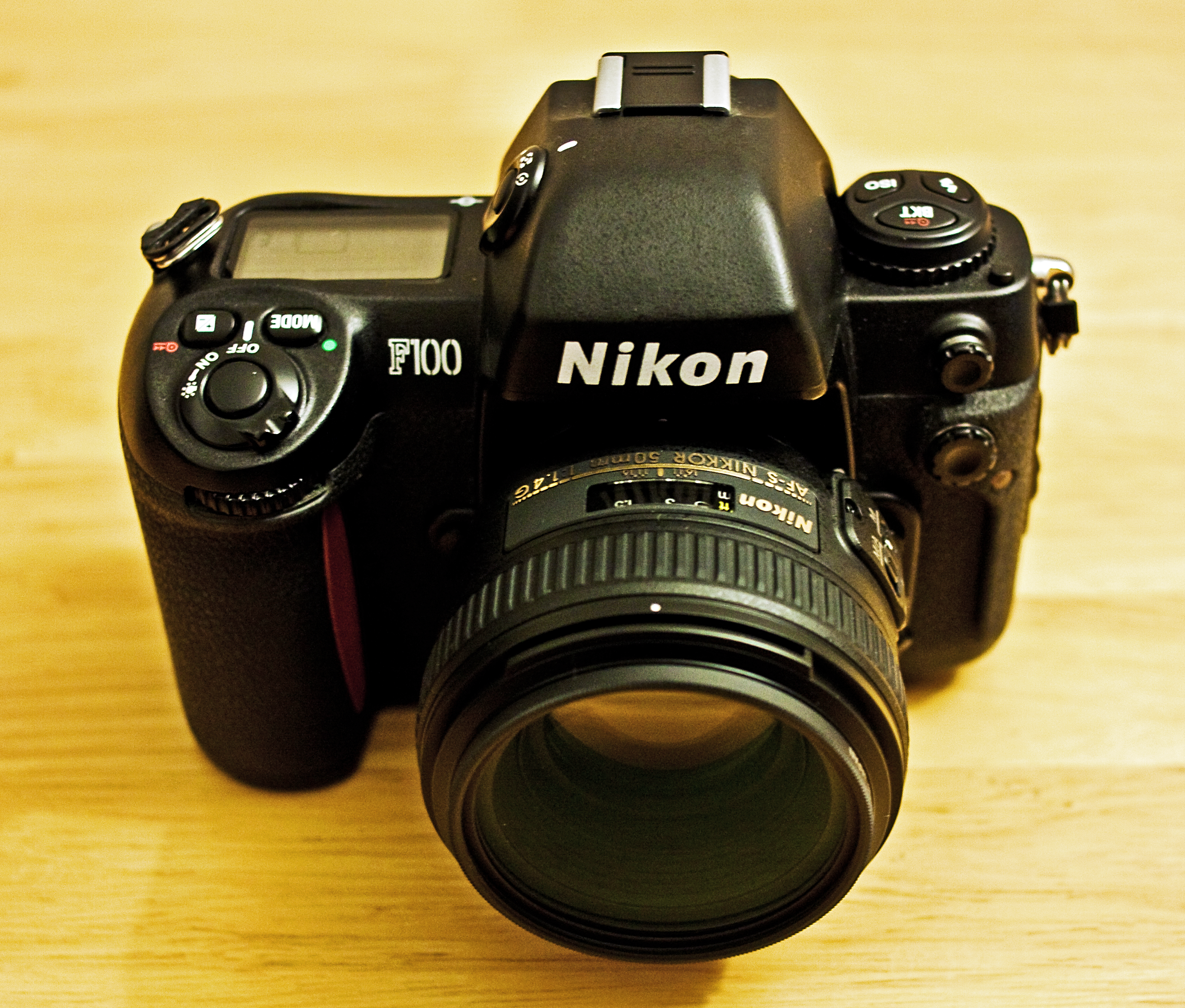
- Nikon F100 camera body with AF-S NIKKOR 50mm f/1.4G lens

Overview
- Maker: Nikon
- Type: 35 mm SLR camera
- Released: 1999
- Production: 1999-2006

Lens
- Lens mount: Nikon F-mount

Focusing
- Focus: TTL Phase Detection Autofocus (5 zone, 3 cross-type)

Exposure/metering
- Exposure: Automatic or manual

Flash
- Flash: Hot shoe or PC

Shutter
- Frame rate: 4.5 fps, 5 fps with MB-15 battery pack.

General
- Battery: MS-12 holder for 4x AA; MS-13 holder for 2x CR123A
- Optional battery packs: MB-15 Multi-Power High Speed Battery Pack
- Weight: 785 g (27.7 oz)
- Made in: Japan

The Nikon F100 is a professional 35 mm film-based single-lens reflex camera body introduced in 1999. It is often thought of as a scaled-down version of the Nikon F5, and as a precursor to the Nikon F6. The F100 was discontinued, along with most other Nikon film cameras, in 2006.

== Design and construction ==
The F100's metering system is a development of Nikon's matrix metering technology introduced in 1983 on the Nikon FA. The meter in the F100 uses a 10 segment light sensor and uses distance information from Nikon D-type and G-type lenses for more accurate exposure calculations when using direct flash. In addition to matrix metering, the F100 also offers standard center-weighted and spot metering modes.

Also incorporated into the camera is Nikon's Dynamic Autofocus system and a 4.5 frame per second motor drive with automatic rewind. The top motor drive speed can be boosted to 5 frames per second with the addition of the Nikon MB-15 battery pack.

The F100 also provides many features which are common among high-end 35 mm SLR cameras, such as automatic bracketing modes, DX film speed sensing, and custom functions that allow photographers to tailor certain aspects of the camera's operation to the way they work.

During its production run, Nikon replaced the film rewind spool for these cameras due to a manufacturing defect. Original spools are tapered and narrower.

Class	1950s					1960s										1970s										1980s										1990s										2000s										2020s			
Class	55	56	57	58	59	60	61	62	63	64	65	66	67	68	69	70	71	72	73	74	75	76	77	78	79	80	81	82	83	84	85	86	87	88	89	90	91	92	93	94	95	96	97	98	99	00	01	02	03	04	05	06	07	08	09	...	20	21	22
Professional					F																					F3																																	
Professional																	F2												F3AF					F4								F5								F6									
High-end																													FA					F-801 (N8008)/ F-801s (N8008s)				F90 (N90)		F90X (N90s)					F100														
Mid-range																																F-501 (N2020)				F-601 (N6006)				F70 (N70)						F80 (N80)													
Mid-range																		EL / EL2 /ELW						FE					FE2							F-601M (N6000)				F70 (N70)						F80 (N80)													
Mid-range											FT		FTn/ FT2/ FT3										FM					FM2																			FM3A												
Mid-range											FS												FM					FM2																			FM3A												
Entry-level																																																											
Entry-level																																										Pronea S																	
Entry-level																																									Pronea 600i/6i																		
Entry-level								Nikkorex F / Nikkor J																	EM			FG			F-301 (N2000)				F-401s (N4004s)					F50 (N50)							F65 (N65 / U)		F75 (N75 / U2)										
Entry-level						35		35 II		Auto 35																				FG-20			F-401 (N4004)				F-401x (N5005)								F60 (N60)			F55 (N55)											
Entry-level									Zoom 35																																FM10 / FE10																		
Class	55	56	57	58	59	60	61	62	63	64	65	66	67	68	69	70	71	72	73	74	75	76	77	78	79	80	81	82	83	84	85	86	87	88	89	90	91	92	93	94	95	96	97	98	99	00	01	02	03	04	05	06	07	08	09	...	20	21	22
Class	1950s					1960s										1970s										1980s										1990s										2000s										2020s			
