= AFL-CIO =

Federation of American trade unions

- American Federation of Labor and Congress of Industrial Organizations
- Formation: December 5, 1955; 70 years ago
- Merger of: American Federation of Labor; Congress of Industrial Organizations
- Type: Trade union center
- Headquarters: Washington, D.C., US
- Members: 12,471,480 (2022)
- President: Liz Shuler
- Secretary-treasurer: Fred Redmond
- Secessions: Strategic Organizing Center
- Affiliations: International Trade Union Confederation
- Website: aflcio.org

The American Federation of Labor and Congress of Industrial Organizations (AFL-CIO) is a national trade union center that is the largest federation of unions in the United States. It is made up of 65 national and international unions, together representing nearly 15 million active and retired workers. The AFL-CIO engages in substantial political spending and activism, typically in support of progressive and pro-labor policies.

The AFL-CIO was formed in 1955 when the American Federation of Labor and the Congress of Industrial Organizations merged after a long estrangement. Union membership in the US peaked in 1979, when the AFL-CIO's affiliated unions had nearly twenty million members. From 1955 until 2005, the AFL-CIO's member unions represented nearly all unionized workers in the United States. Several large unions split away from the AFL-CIO and formed the rival Change to Win Federation in 2005, although a number of those unions have since re-affiliated, and many locals of Change to Win are either part of or work with their local central labor councils. The largest unions currently in the AFL-CIO are the Service Employees International Union (SEIU), with 2 million members, American Federation of Teachers (AFT) with approximately 1.7 million members, American Federation of State, County and Municipal Employees (AFSCME), with approximately 1.4 million members, and United Food and Commercial Workers with 1.2 million members.

== Membership ==
The AFL-CIO is a federation of international labor unions. As a voluntary federation, the AFL-CIO has little authority over the affairs of its member unions except in extremely limited cases (such as the ability to expel a member union for corruption and enforce resolution of disagreements over jurisdiction or organizing). As of January 2025, the AFL-CIO had 61 member unions representing nearly 15 million members.

== Political activities ==
The AFL-CIO was a major component of the New Deal Coalition that dominated politics into the mid-1960s. Although it has lost membership, finances, and political clout since 1970, it remains a major player on the liberal side of national politics, with a great deal of activity in lobbying, grassroots organizing, coordinating with other liberal organizations, fund-raising, and recruiting and supporting candidates around the country.

In recent years the AFL-CIO has concentrated its political efforts on lobbying in Washington and the state capitals, and on "GOTV" (get-out-the-vote) campaigns in major elections. For example, in the 2010 midterm elections, it sent 28.6 million pieces of mail. Members received a "slate card" with a list of union endorsements matched to the member's congressional district, along with a "personalized" letter from President Obama emphasizing the importance of voting. In addition, 100,000 volunteers went door-to-door to promote endorsed candidates to 13 million union voters in 32 states.

== Governance ==
The AFL-CIO is governed by its members, who meet in a quadrennial convention. Each member union elects delegates, based on proportional representation. The AFL-CIO's state federations, central and local labor councils, constitutional departments, and constituent groups are also entitled to delegates. The delegates elect officers and vice presidents, debate and approve policy, and set dues.

=== Annual meetings ===
From 1951 to 1996, the Executive Council held its winter meeting in the resort town of Bal Harbour, Florida. The meeting at the Bal Harbour Sheraton has been the object of frequent criticism, including over a labor dispute at the hotel itself.

Citing image concerns, the council changed the meeting site to Los Angeles. However, the meeting was moved back to Bal Harbour several years later. The 2012 meeting was held in Orlando, Florida.

=== State and local bodies ===
The AFL-CIO constitution permits international unions to pay state federation and central labor council (CLC) dues directly, rather than have each local or state federation pay them. This relieves each union's state and local affiliates of the administrative duty of assessing, collecting and paying the dues. International unions assess the AFL-CIO dues themselves, and collect them on top of their own dues-generating mechanisms or simply pay them out of the dues the international collects. But not all international unions pay their required state federation and CLC dues.

=== Constitutional departments ===
One of the most well-known departments was the Industrial Union Department (IUD). It had been constitutionally mandated by the new AFL-CIO constitution created by the merger of the AFL and CIO in 1955, as CIO unions felt that the AFL's commitment to industrial unionism was not strong enough to permit the department to survive without a constitutional mandate. For many years, the IUD was a de facto organizing department in the AFL-CIO. For example, it provided money to the near-destitute American Federation of Teachers (AFT) as it attempted to organize the United Federation of Teachers in 1961. The organizing money enabled the AFT to win the election and establish its first large collective bargaining affiliate. For many years, the IUD remained rather militant on a number of issues.

There are six AFL-CIO constitutionally mandated departments:

- North America's Building Trades Unions
- Maritime Trades Department, AFL-CIO
- Metal Trades Department, AFL-CIO
- Department for Professional Employees, AFL-CIO
- Transportation Trades Department, AFL-CIO
- Union Label and Service Trades Department, AFL-CIO

== Constituency groups ==
Constituency groups are nonprofit organizations chartered and funded by the AFL-CIO as voter registration and mobilization bodies. These groups conduct research, host training and educational conferences, issue research reports and publications, lobby for legislation and build coalitions with local groups. Each constituency group has the right to sit in on AFL-CIO executive council meetings, and to exercise representational and voting rights at AFL-CIO conventions.

The AFL-CIO's seven constituency groups include the A. Philip Randolph Institute, the AFL-CIO Union Veterans Council, the Asian Pacific American Labor Alliance, the Coalition of Black Trade Unionists, the Coalition of Labor Union Women, the Labor Council for Latin American Advancement and Pride at Work.

== Allied organizations ==
The Working for America Institute started out as a department of the AFL-CIO. Established in 1958, it was previously known as the Human Resources Development Institute (HRDI). John Sweeney renamed the department and spun it off as an independent organization in 1998 to act as a lobbying group to promote economic development, develop new economic policies, and lobby Congress on economic policy. The American Center for International Labor Solidarity started out as the Free Trade Union Committee (FTUC), which internationally promoted free labor-unions.

Other organizations that are allied with the AFL-CIO include:

- Alliance for Retired Americans
- Solidarity Center
- American Rights at Work
- International Labor Communications Association
- Jobs with Justice
- Labor Heritage Foundation
- Labor and Working-Class History Association
- National Day Laborer Organizing Network
- United Students Against Sweatshops
- Working America
- Working for America Institute
- Ohio Organizing Collaborative

== Programs ==
Programs are organizations established and controlled by the AFL-CIO to serve certain organizational goals. Programs of the AFL-CIO include the AFL-CIO Building Investment Trust, the AFL-CIO Employees Federal Credit Union, the AFL-CIO Housing Investment Trust, the National Labor College and Union Privilege.

== International policy ==
The AFL-CIO is affiliated to the Brussels-based International Trade Union Confederation, formed November 1, 2006. The new body incorporated the member organizations of the International Confederation of Free Trade Unions, of which the AFL-CIO had long been part. The AFL-CIO had had a very active foreign policy in building and strengthening free trade unions. During the Cold War, it vigorously opposed Communist unions in Latin America and Europe. In opposing Communism, it helped split the CGT in France and helped create the anti-Communist Force Ouvrière.

According to the cybersecurity firm Area 1, hackers working for the People's Liberation Army Strategic Support Force compromised the networks of the AFL-CIO in order to gain information on negotiations for the Trans-Pacific Partnership.

== History ==
=== Civil rights ===
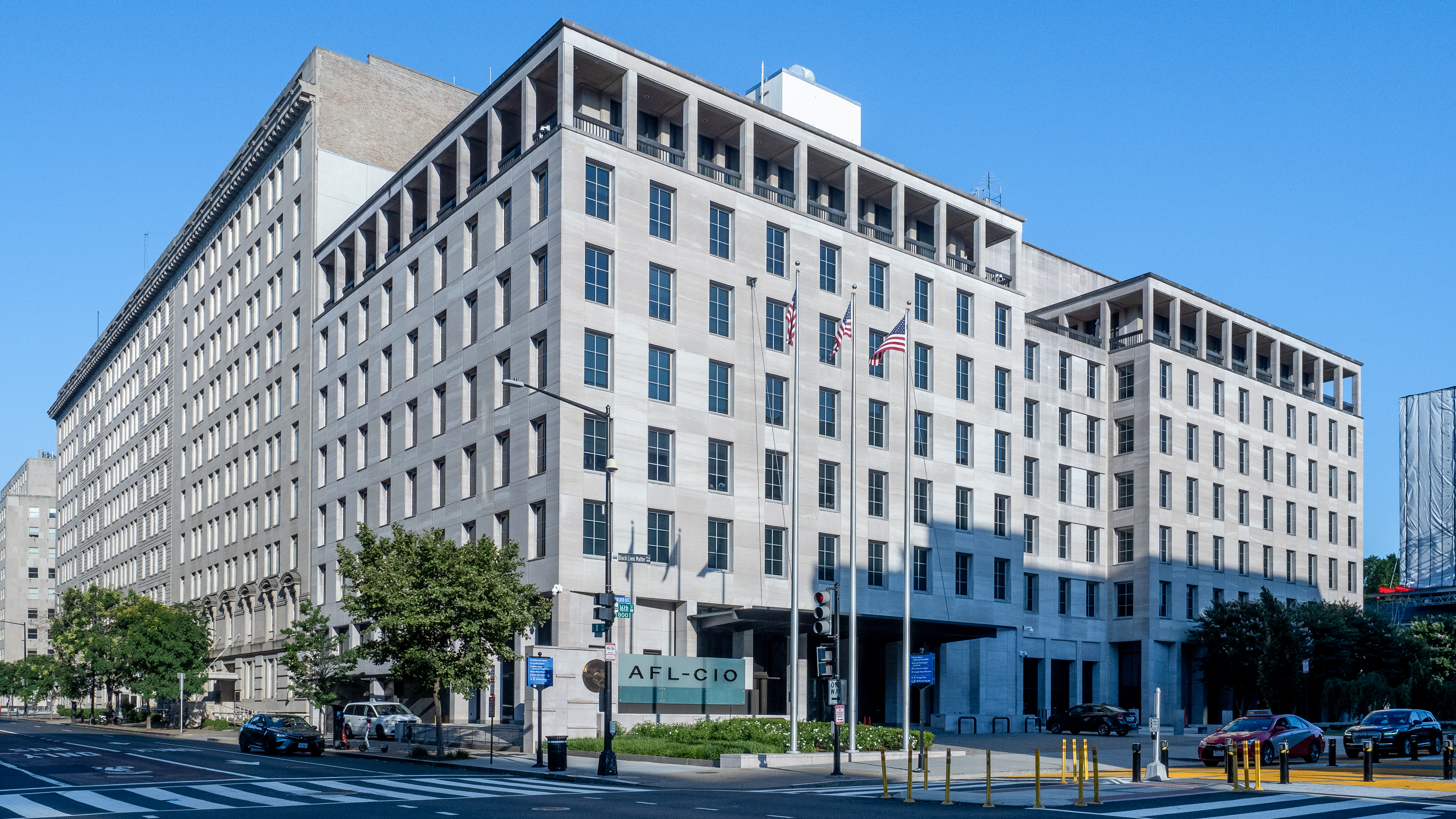
AFL-CIO headquarters in Washington, DC

The AFL-CIO has a long relationship with civil rights struggles. One of the major points of contention between the AFL and the CIO, particularly in the era immediately after the CIO split off, was the CIO's willingness to include black workers (excluded by the AFL in its focus on craft unionism). Later, black workers would also criticize the CIO for abandoning their interests, particularly after the merger with the AFL.

In 1961, Martin Luther King Jr. gave a speech titled "If the Negro Wins, Labor Wins" to the organization's convention in Bal Harbour, Florida. King hoped for a coalition between civil rights and labor that would improve the situation for the entire working class by ending racial discrimination. However, King also criticized the AFL-CIO for its tolerance of unions that excluded black workers. "I would be lacking in honesty," he told the delegates of the 1965 Illinois AFL-CIO Convention during his keynote address, "if I did not point out that the labor movement of thirty years ago did more in that period for civil rights than labor is doing today...Our combined strength is potentially enormous, but we have not used a fraction of it for our own good or the needs of society as a whole." King and the AFL-CIO diverged further in 1967, when King announced his opposition to the Vietnam War, which the AFL-CIO strongly supported. The AFL-CIO endorsed the Civil Rights Act of 1964.

==== Police violence ====
In the 21st century, the AFL-CIO has been criticized by campaigners against police violence for its affiliation with the International Union of Police Associations (IUPA). On May 31, 2020, the AFL-CIO offices in Washington, DC, were set on fire during the George Floyd protests taking place in the city. In response, AFL-CIO president Richard Trumka condemned both the murder of George Floyd and the destruction of the offices, but did not address demands to end the organization's affiliation with the IUPA.

=== Triumph and disaster: the politics of the 1960s and 70s ===
After the smashing electoral victory of President Lyndon B. Johnson in 1964, the heavily Democratic Congress passed a raft of liberal legislation. Labor union leaders claimed credit for the widest range of liberal laws since the New Deal era, including the Civil Rights Act of 1964; the Voting Rights Act of 1965; the War on Poverty; aid to cities and education; increased Social Security benefits; and Medicare for the elderly. The 1966 elections were an unexpected disaster, with defeats for many of the more liberal Democrats. According to Alan Draper, the AFL-CIO Committee on Political Action (COPE) was the main electioneering unit of the labor movement. It ignored the white backlash against civil rights. The COPE assumed falsely that union members were interested in issues of greatest salience to union leadership, but polls showed this was not true. The members were much more conservative. The younger ones were deeply concerned about taxes and crime, and the older ones had more conservative social views. Furthermore, a new issue—the War in Vietnam—was bitterly splitting the New Deal coalition into hawks (led by Johnson and Vice President Hubert Humphrey) and doves (led by Senators Eugene McCarthy and Robert Kennedy). The AFL-CIO continued to experience political defeats in the 1970s, particularly when it came to the Democratic nomination of George McGovern in 1972. The federation leaders were opposed to McGovern's stance on issues such as the Vietnam War. Although they attempted to stop the nomination at the Democratic National Convention of 1972, their attempts proved to be futile as they realized the chokehold they had on politics was giving way to a more diverse set of delegates. This marked a turning point in the political power they held as a federation in the U.S.

=== New Unity Partnership ===
In 2003, the AFL-CIO began an intense internal debate over the future of the labor movement in the United States with the creation of the New Unity Partnership (NUP), a loose coalition of some of the AFL-CIO's largest unions. This debate intensified in 2004, after the defeat of labor-backed candidate John Kerry in the November 2004 US presidential election. The NUP's program for reform of the federation included reduction of the central bureaucracy, more money spent on organizing new members rather than on electoral politics, and a restructuring of unions and locals, eliminating some smaller locals and focusing more along the lines of industrial unionism.

In 2005, the NUP dissolved and the Change to Win Federation (CtW) formed, threatening to secede from the AFL-CIO if its demands for major reorganization were not met. As the AFL-CIO prepared for its 50th anniversary convention in late July, three of the federations' four largest unions announced their withdrawal from the federation: the Service Employees International Union (SEIU), the International Brotherhood of Teamsters ("The Teamsters"), and the United Food and Commercial Workers International Union (UFCW). UNITE HERE disaffiliated in mid-September 2005, the United Farm Workers left in January 2006, and the Laborers' International Union of North America disaffiliated on June 1, 2006.

Two unions later left CtW and rejoined the AFL-CIO. After a bitter internal leadership dispute that involved allegations of embezzlement and accusations that SEIU was attempting to raid the union, a substantial number of UNITE HERE members formed their own union (Workers United) while the remainder of UNITE HERE reaffiliated with the AFL-CIO on September 17, 2009. The Laborers' International Union of North America said on August 13, 2010, that it would also leave Change to Win and rejoin the AFL-CIO in October 2010. The Service Employees International Union (SEIU) also rejoined the AFL-CIO in January 2025.

=== ILWU disaffiliation ===
In August 2013, the International Longshore and Warehouse Union (ILWU) disaffiliated from the AFL-CIO. The ILWU said that members of other AFL-CIO unions were crossing its picket lines, and the AFL-CIO had done nothing to stop it. The ILWU also cited the AFL-CIO's willingness to compromise on key policies such as labor law reform, immigration reform, and health care reform. The longshoremen's union said it would become an independent union.

=== Norfolk Southern proxy fight ===
In 2024, AFL-CIO voiced its opposition to an investor-led plan at Norfolk Southern Railway to replace the company's top management and several board members. Organized labor is divided on the issue, which is the major sticking point of a proxy battle between NS management and investors ahead of a May 9, 2024 shareholder meeting. AFL-CIO came out and voiced its support for Norfolk's CEO Alan Shaw, citing concerns about safety, service, and job losses. The union criticized the proposal to replace Shaw and implement a system known as precision railroading.

== Leadership ==
=== Presidents ===
- George Meany (1955–1979)
- Lane Kirkland (1979–1995)
- Thomas R. Donahue (1995)
- John J. Sweeney (1995–2009)
- Richard Trumka (2009–2021)
- Liz Shuler (2021–present)

=== Secretary-treasurers ===
1955: William F. Schnitzler
1969: Lane Kirkland
1979: Thomas R. Donahue
1995: Barbara Easterling
1995: Richard Trumka
2009: Liz Shuler
2021: Fred Redmond

=== Executive vice presidents ===
1995–2007: Linda Chavez-Thompson
2007–2013: Arlene Holt Baker
2013–2022: Tefere Gebre

== See also ==
- Canadian Labour Congress
- Directly affiliated local union
- Labor history of the United States
- Labor unions in the United States
- List of labor unions in the United States
