= Rice County Courthouse and Jail =

- Rice County Courthouse
- U.S. National Register of Historic Places
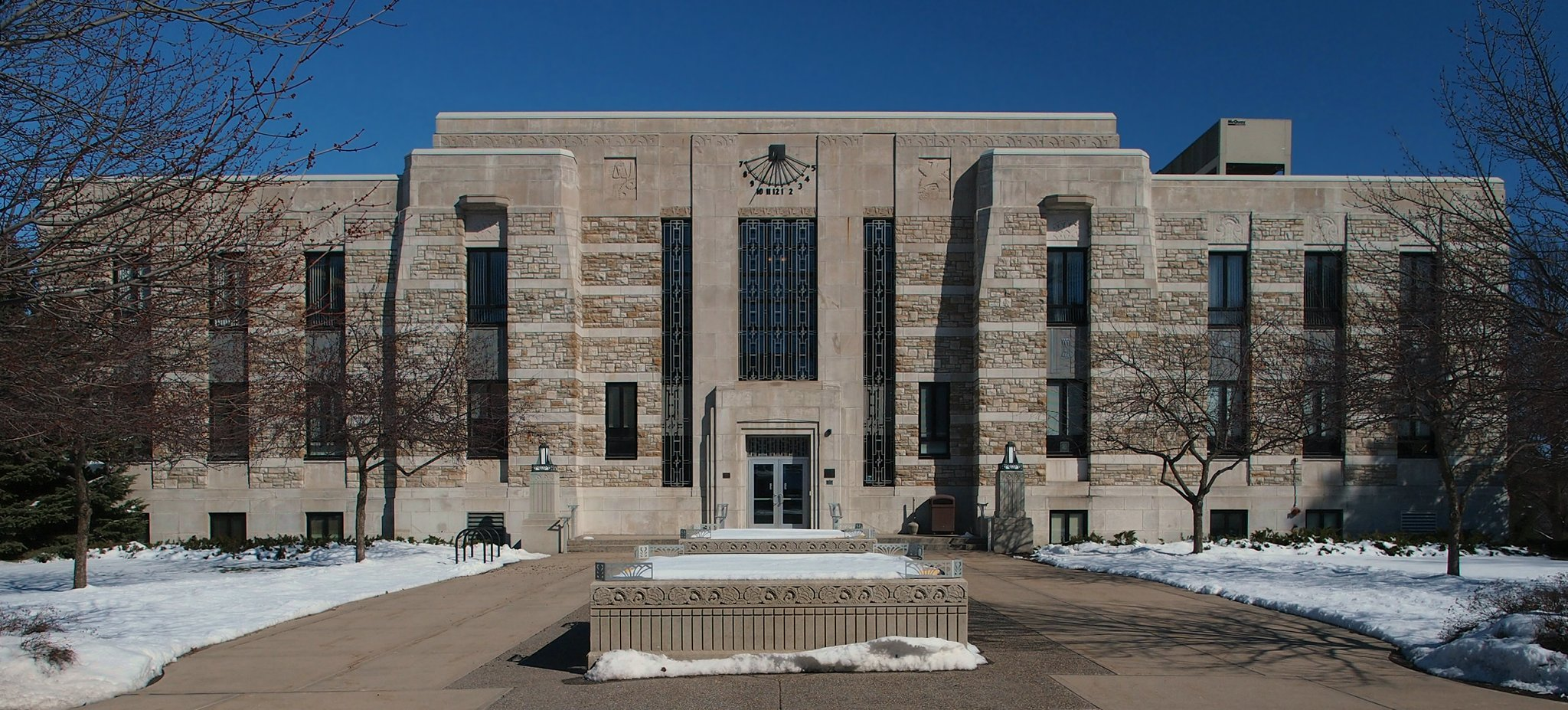
- The Rice County Courthouse from the south

- Location within Minnesota Location within the United States
- Location: 218 3rd Street NW, Faribault, Minnesota
- Coordinates: 44°17′38″N 93°16′18″W
- Area: 5 acres (2.0 ha)
- Built: 1910, 1934
- Architect: Nairne W. Fisher (courthouse), Albert Schippel (jail)
- Architectural style: Art Deco (courthouse), Richardsonian Romanesque (jail)
- MPS: Rice County MRA
- NRHP reference No.: 82003016

The Rice County Courthouse, located at 218 3rd Street NW in Faribault, Rice County, in the U.S. state of Minnesota, is an Art Deco building constructed of natural-face Faribault stone horizontally banded at intervals with sawed-faced stone. Nairne W. Fisher of St. Cloud was the architect for the courthouse, and is also credited with designing the Pope County Courthouse. The main rotunda has metal fixtures and Art Deco glass. Polished black and gray Tennessee marble is used extensively in the walls, floors, and stairs, with a terrazzo map of Rice County centered on the floor. The 16-foot-high (4.9 m) courtroom on the third floor was finished with fine-grained walnut walls with matching custom-built furnishings. The building was built in 1934 at a cost of $200,000.

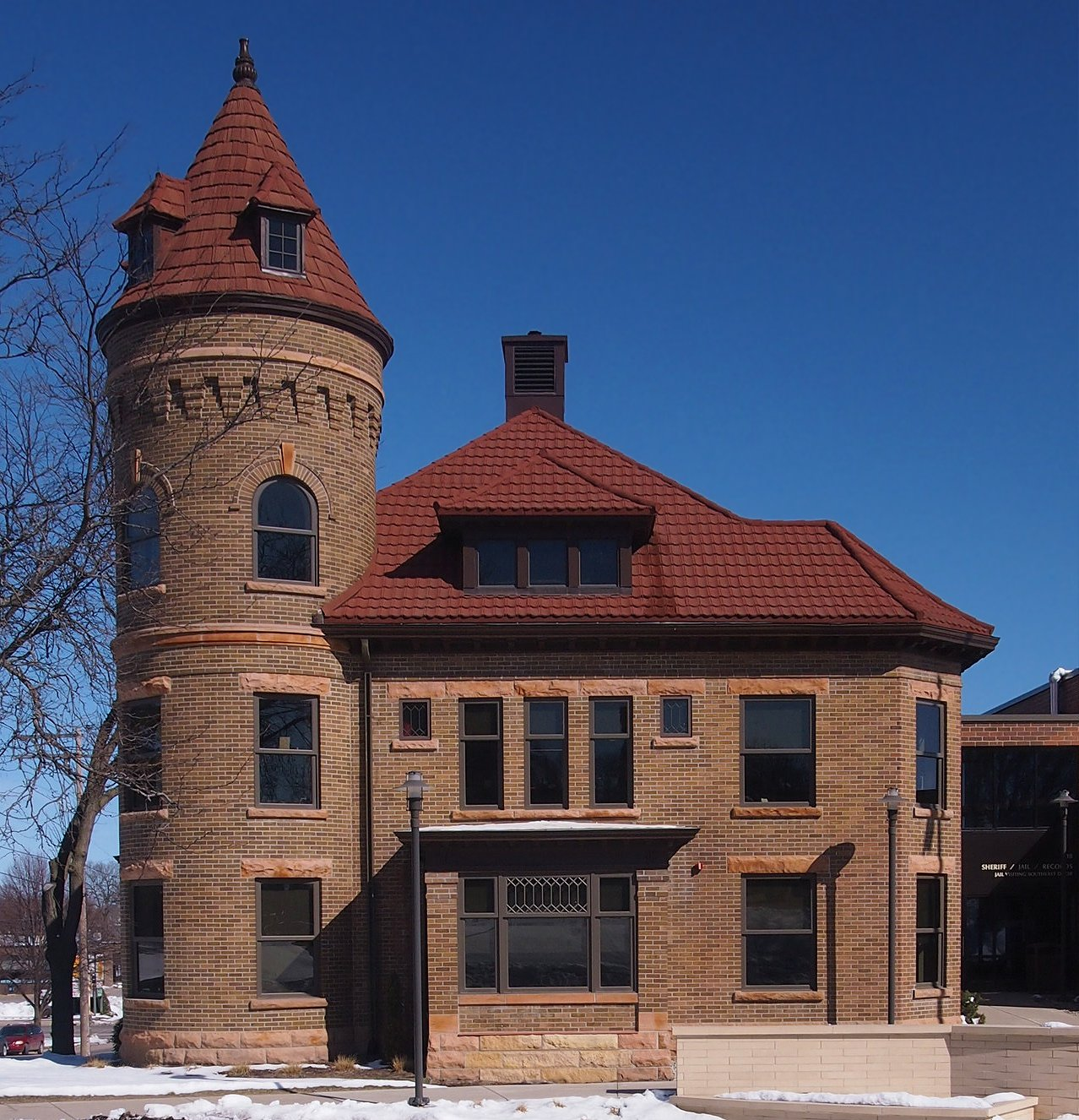
The former Rice County Jail from the south

A guidebook to Minnesota architecture described the courthouse building as "A near-perfect mixture of the classical and the Zigzag Moderne. Relief sculpture on the sides of the building along 4th and 3rd Streets extols civic virtue, industry and farming. Within, a central rotunda is approached by a Zigzag Moderne staircase; Moderne metal and glass light fixtures abound."

The brick jail building, located at 128 3rd Street NW in Faribault, was constructed in 1910 in the Richardsonian Romanesque style, and was designed by Albert Schippel of Mankato, Minnesota.
