= ILC =

ILC may refer to:

== Organisations ==
- ILC Dover, American engineering and manufacturing company
- International Latex Corporation, predecessor of ILC Dover
- Immanuel Lutheran College (disambiguation), multiple schools
- Independent Learning Centre, provider of distance education in Ontario, Canada
- Indigenous Land Corporation, former name of the Indigenous Land and Sea Corporation, Australia
- Indigenous Law Centre, at the University of New South Wales, Sydney, Australia
- Industrial loan company/corporation, a financial institution in the US that lends money
- International Labor Comparisons, division in the US Bureau of Labor Statistics
- International Labour Conference of the International Labour Organization
- International Law Commission, a body of legal experts
- International Land Coalition, a global social equity alliance
- International Lutheran Council, an association of Lutheran denominations
- Interprovincial Lottery Corporation in Canada
- Irish Land Commission, 1881–1999

== Science and technology ==
- Innate lymphoid cell, part of the immune system
- Interchangeable-lens camera, another name for a system camera where the camera body is separate from the lens
- Invasive lobular carcinoma, a form of breast cancer
- International Linear Collider, a proposed particle accelerator

== Other ==
- Illinois Compiled Statutes, codified statutes of Illinois
- In Living Color, an American comedy TV series
- Iterative learning control, a form of production-process tracking control
