= Immanuel College =

Immanuel College may refer to:

- Immanuel College, Adelaide, South Australia
- Immanuel College, Bushey, an independent co-educational secondary school north of London
- Immanuel College, Bradford, a state school in Yorkshire
- Immanuel Christian School, New Zealand, in Auckland

== See also ==
- Emmanuel College (disambiguation)
- Immanuel Lutheran College (disambiguation)
