= Emmanuel College =

Emmanuel College may refer to one of several academic institutions:

== Australia ==
- Emmanuel College, University of Queensland, in St Lucia, Brisbane
- Emmanuel College, Gold Coast, a multi-denominational Christian school in Carrara
- Emmanuel College, Melbourne, a Roman Catholic secondary school with two campuses
- Emmanuel College, Warrnambool, a Roman Catholic secondary school with three campuses

== Canada ==
- Emmanuel College, Toronto, part of Victoria University in the University of Toronto
- Emmanuel Bible College, a religious college in Kitchener, Ontario

== England ==
- Emmanuel College, Cambridge, a constituent college of the University of Cambridge
- Emmanuel College, Gateshead, formerly Emmanuel City Technology College

== United States ==
- Emmanuel University, a liberal arts college in Franklin Springs, Georgia
- Emmanuel College (Massachusetts), a liberal arts college in Boston, Massachusetts

== See also ==
- Immanuel College (disambiguation)
