= Working for America Institute =

Non-profit organization

- Working for America Institute
- Founded: 1968
- Headquarters: Washington, D.C.
- Location: United States
- Key people: Nancy Mills, executive director
- Affiliations: AFL–CIO
- Website: www.workingforamerica.org

The Working for America Institute (WAI) is a non-profit organization that is an allied organization of the AFL–CIO. It promotes economic development, develops new economic policies, and lobbies the United States Congress on economic policy.

It was established in 1968 as the Human Resources Development Institute (HRDI) of the AFL–CIO. The AFL–CIO changed its name, structure, and goals in 1998 as part of a large AFL–CIO restructuring.

WAI receives financial support from the federal government, private foundations, and the AFL–CIO.
