= System camera =

Camera with interchangeable components

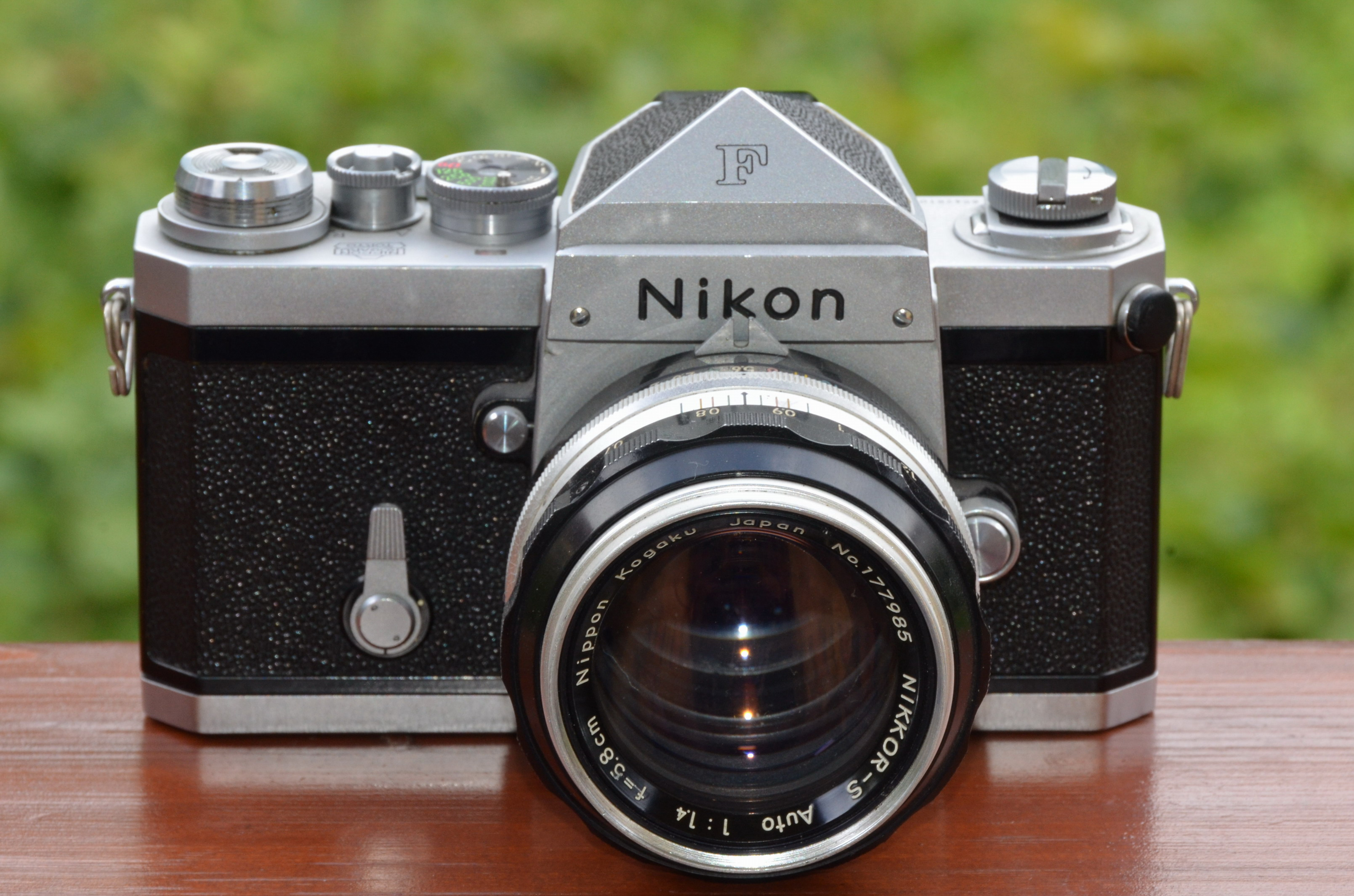
Nikon F chrome with eyelevel prism and NIKKOR-S Auto 1:1.4 f=5.8cm lens (1959) – an early SLR system camera.

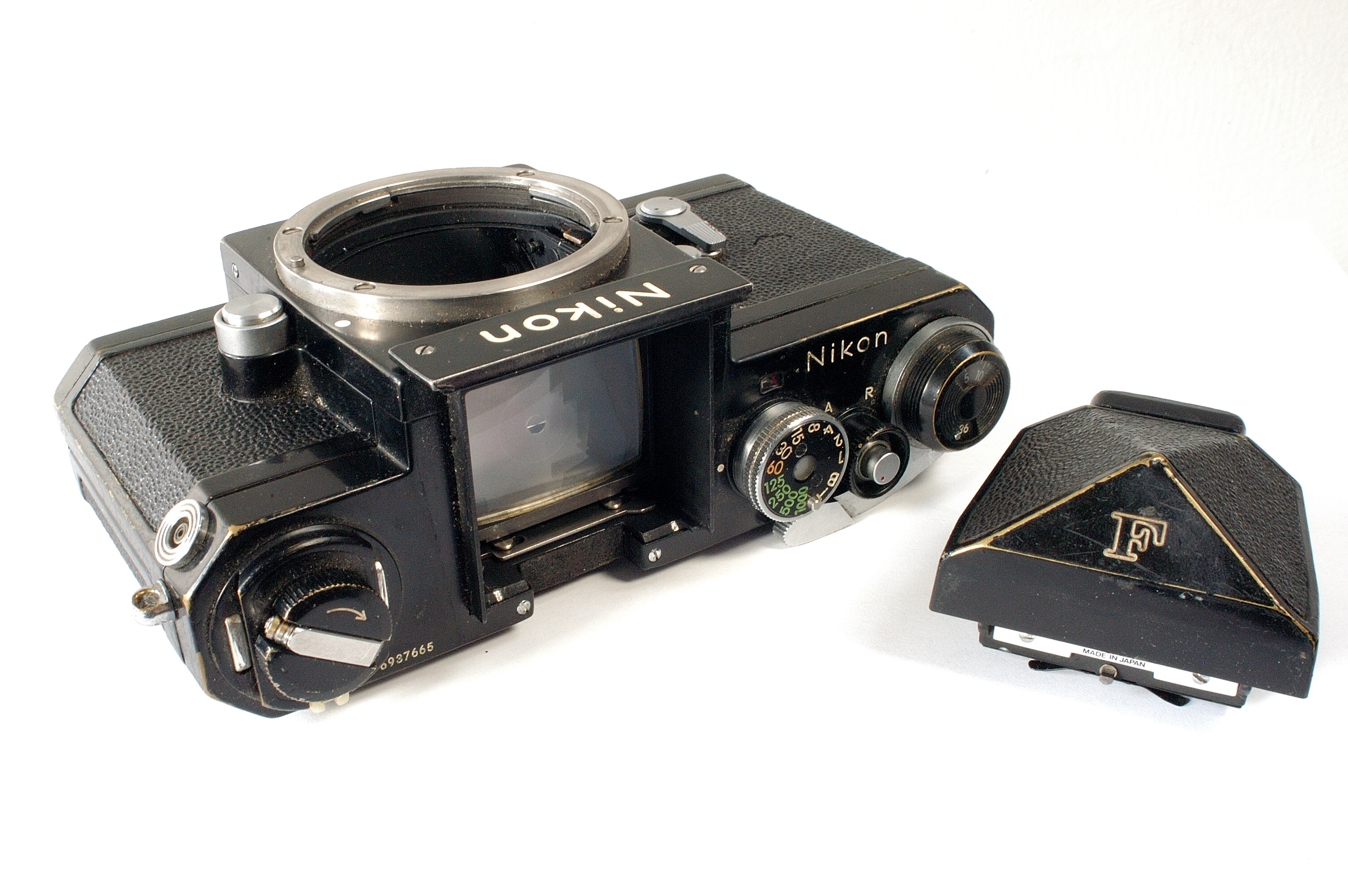
A Nikon F body and viewfinder

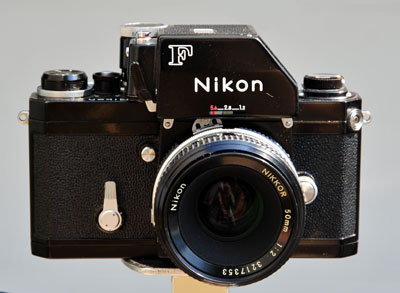
Nikon F with interchangeable photomic TTL metering prism

A system camera is a camera whose body is designed to support interchangeable components, most importantly an interchangeable lens, as well as other accessories.

Components may use different physical sockets, electrical contacts, and digital protocols, so not all are compatible with each other. A set of compatible components is referred to as a system. Systems are usually named for the lens mount, such Nikon F-mount, Canon EF mount, and M42 mount (a non-proprietary mount using a 42 mm × 1 mm screw thread).

Early system cameras include Leica I Schraubgewinde (1930), Exakta (1936) and the Nikon F (1959). System cameras are often single-lens reflex (SLR) or twin-lens reflex (TLR) but can also be rangefinder cameras or, more recently, mirrorless interchangeable-lens cameras. Voice coil motors (VCMs) or piezoelectric motors are used to control the lens movement to achieve fast and accurate autofocus. These motors move the lens elements to focus the light onto the sensor with high precision.

At the minimum, a system camera includes a camera body and separate, interchangeable lenses. Other accessories are also available:

- Electronic flash units matching the camera's capabilities.
- PC socket or tripod-adapter mounts for external flash units, rather than just a hot shoe
- Mechanical, electric, or IR/RF remote shutter release.
- Extensive supplementary equipment for macro photography and photomicrography.
- Adapters for third-party or legacy lenses, including tilt-shift adapters
- For film cameras, a motor drive to advance the film automatically.
- For film cameras, different camera backs, e.g. large capacity for bulk film, or data back or datebacks for recording exposure and date information.
- Add-on correction or magnifying lenses to help focusing or composition through the viewfinder.
- Interchangeable viewfinders, including interchangeable focusing screens in the case of SLRs. Viewfinders and focusing screens could give different metering options.
- Extra-capacity battery packs, often in the form of a "battery grip" (a second, portrait-oriented handgrip), but also including fully external packs with cable interface
- AC adapters with dummy-battery interfaces for studio or other stationary work
- Sockets and matching cables for direct output, e.g., to a television
- Depth of field preview
- Global navigation satellite system receivers, e.g. (GPS) for geotagging
- Bluetooth or Wi-Fi networking modules

While some early mechanical interfaces are standardized across brands, optical and electronic interfaces are often proprietary. Hot shoes have a common interface for basic flash functions, but often contain proprietary contacts inside for advanced flashes and data modules.
