= Albert Schippel =

American architect

- Born: 1862; Wisconsin
- Died: 22 January 1935; Dallas, Texas
- Occupation: Architect
- Buildings: Rice County Courthouse and Jail

Albert Schippel (1862–1935) was an American architect in the Midwest.

He designed buildings including:

- Rice County Jail, (1910), Faribault, Minnesota
- Oleander Saloon, (1901), Mankato, Wisconsin
- Immanuel Lutheran School, (1903), Mankato, Wisconsin
- German Evangelical Ladies Seminary, (1910), Mankato, Wisconsin. The seminary has since become Bethany Lutheran College.
