= International Labor Communications Association =

Professional organization of labor communicators in North America

ILCA
- International Labor Communications Association, AFL-CIO
- Founded: 1955
- Headquarters: Washington, D.C.
- Location: United States
- Key people: Kathy Cummings, president
- Affiliations: AFL–CIO, Canadian Labour Congress
- Website: https://laborcommunicators.org/

The International Labor Communications Association (ILCA) is a professional organization for trade union publications and media production departments of national, regional and/or local affiliates of the AFL–CIO and Canadian Labour Congress. It is a nonpartisan, non-profit organization which provides resources, expertise and networking opportunities for labor communicators.

The ILCA was founded in 1955 as the International Labor Press Association. Its formation was brought about by the merger of the American Federation of Labor and the Congress of Industrial Organizations. The body was established as a means of coordinating the message of the new organization in labor newsletters, newspapers and magazines throughout the labor movements. It changed its name to ILCA in 1985.

The ILCA is not a competitor to the Canadian Association of Labour Media/Association canadienne de la presse syndicale (CALM/acps) (the organization representing labor media in Canada). The ILCA and CALM/acps share the goal of increasing the effectiveness of labor media and promoting the objectives of the labor movement in both nations. Accordingly, both organizations hold fraternal associate membership status in the other, and both organizations have a seat on the other's executive council.
