= Amalgamated Bank of Chicago =

Commercial bank

- Type: Private
- Industry: Financial services
- Founded: 1922
- Headquarters: Chicago, Illinois, US
- Number of locations: 2
- Key people: Robert M. Wrobel (CEO)
- Services: Banking
- Revenue: US$ 54.2 million (2023) (net interest income + non-interest income)
- Operating income: $15.6 million (2023) (before taxes)
- Total assets: $1346 million (2023)
- Total equity: $109.4 million (2023)
- Number of employees: 160 (2023)
- Parent: Amalgamated Investments Company
- Website: https://www.aboc.com/

The Amalgamated Bank of Chicago (ABOC) is a commercial bank headquartered in Chicago, Illinois, United States. In addition to its downtown Chicago office, the bank has a branch office in Warrenville, Illinois.

Until November 1991, the bank was known as Amalgamated Trust & Savings Bank. In July, 2024 the bank was rebranded as ABOC.

ABOC announced plans to be acquired by Amalgamated Bank of New York during 2021. In early 2022 Amalgamated Financial (the New York bank's holding company) announced the $98 million acquisition plan was ended due to regulatory difficulties, but ABOC said it could still proceed.

== History and ownership ==
The bank was founded in 1922 by the Amalgamated Clothing Workers of America, which also started the Amalgamated Bank of New York.

In 1966, a group of private investors led by Eugene P. Heytow bought control of the Chicago bank, which was to remain 5% union-owned.

Amalgamated Trust of Chicago and Amalgamated Bank have agreed that they may both use the registered service mark "Amalgamated Bank." The U.S. Trademark Office objected to this concurrent use as likely to confuse consumers, but the U.S. Court of Appeals for the Seventh Circuit ultimately held that the Trademark Office should respect the banks' agreement.

In 2000, Ullico Inc., a union-oriented insurance and investment company, announced that it would buy the bank but withdrew its request the following year.

The parent company for ABOC is Amalgamated Investments Company, a one bank holding company.

Although no longer majority-owned by a union, the bank's board of directors continues to include a number of local and international union representatives and the employees are represented by the Workers United union.

In 2024 ABOC announced plans to expand outside of the Chicago area, starting with St. Louis. Removing "Chicago" from the name when rebranding to ABOC facilitated this expansion.

In January 2025, Robert Wrobel announced his resignation from the CEO role, but retained his functions as Chairman of the Board.

== Financial condition ==
As of December 31, 2023, the bank had $1346 million in assets and $1172 million in deposits.

== See also ==
- List of banks
- List of banks in United States

== Other sources ==
- Foner, Philip S. History of the Labor Movement in the United States. Volume IX: The T.U.E.L. to the End of the Gompers Era. Rev. ed. New York City: International Publishers, 1991. ISBN 0-7178-0673-1
