= Nikon D1 =

1999 APS-C digital single-lens reflex camera

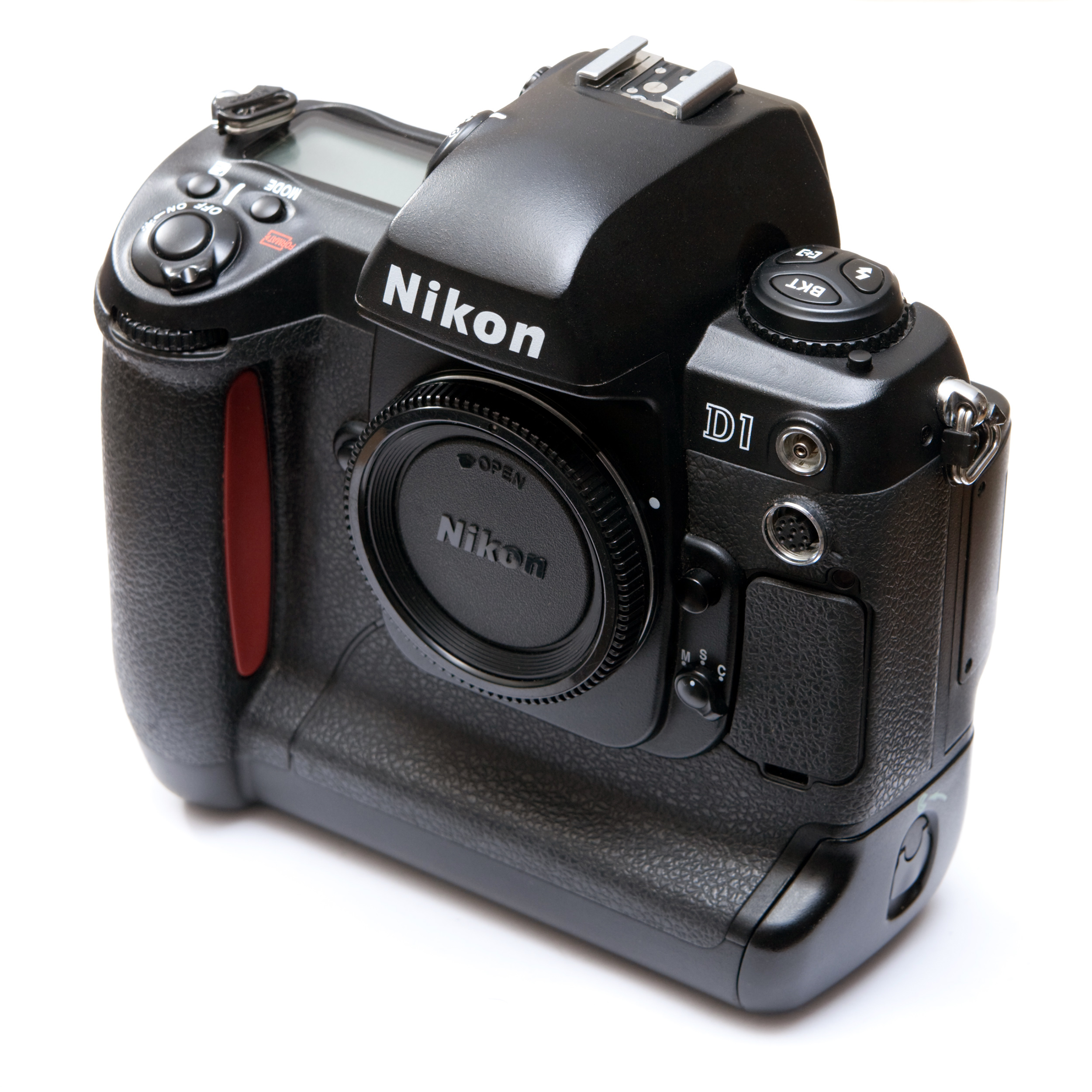

Overview
- Maker: Nikon Corporation
- Type: Digital single-lens reflex camera
- Production: 1999-06-15 through 2001-02-05 (1 year 8 months)
- Intro price: US$5,500

Lens
- Lens: Interchangeable, Nikon F-mount

Sensor/medium
- Sensor: CCD, 23.7 × 15.6 mm DX format, 1.5× FOV crop, 11.8 µm pixel(quadra filter),5.9 µm pixel size.
- Maximum resolution: 2,000 × 1,312 (2.7 megapixel)
- Film speed: 200–1600 in 1 EV steps
- Recording medium: CompactFlash (Type I or Type II, 2GB maximum)

Focusing
- Focus modes: Single-servo AF (S), continuous-servo AF (C), manual (M)
- Focus areas: 5 areas with Multi-CAM 1300 Autofocus system

Exposure/metering
- Exposure modes: Programmed Auto [P] with flexible program; Shutter-Priority Auto [S]; Aperture Priority Auto [A]; Manual [M]
- Exposure metering: 3D Color Matrix Metering Through-the-lens (TTL) Full-Aperture exposure metering with 1,005-pixel CCD
- Metering modes: 256-segment Matrix Metering, Center-weighted (75% weighted 8 mm circle), and Spot (2%)

Flash
- Flash: 3D Multi-Sensor Balanced Fill-Flash, 5-segment TTL Multi Sensor

Shutter
- Shutter: Charge-coupled electronic and mechanical shutter
- Shutter speed range: 30 to 1/16,000 s and Bulb, 1/500 s X-sync
- Continuous shooting: 4.5 frame/s, up to 21 frames

Viewfinder
- Viewfinder: Optical

Image processing
- White balance: Auto, Six presets, Manual preset, Fine tunable

General
- LCD screen: 2 in (51 mm), 120,000-dot TFT LCD
- Battery: Nikon EN-4 Ni-MH battery pack (7.2V DC)
- Weight: Approx. 1.1 kg (without battery or lens)
- Made in: Japan

The Nikon D1 is a digital single-lens reflex camera (DSLR) that was made by Nikon Corporation and introduced on June 15, 1999. It features a 2.7-megapixel image sensor, 4.5-frames-per-second continuous shooting, and accepts the full range of Nikon F-mount lenses. The camera body strongly resembles the F5 and has the same general layout of controls, allowing users of Nikon film SLR cameras to quickly become proficient in using the camera. Autofocus speed on the D1 series bodies is extremely fast, even with "screw-driven" AF lenses.

Although Nikon and other manufacturers had produced digital SLR cameras for several years prior, the D1 was the first professional digital SLR that displaced Kodak's then-undisputed reign over the professional market.

Unusual for a DSLR, the D1 uses the NTSC color space instead of the conventional sRGB or Adobe RGB color spaces. The resulting color on the D1 can be a bit unorthodox, but methods of correcting and/or compensating for the color problem are readily available.

The introductory price of the D1 (body only) was US$5,500.

== D1H and D1X ==
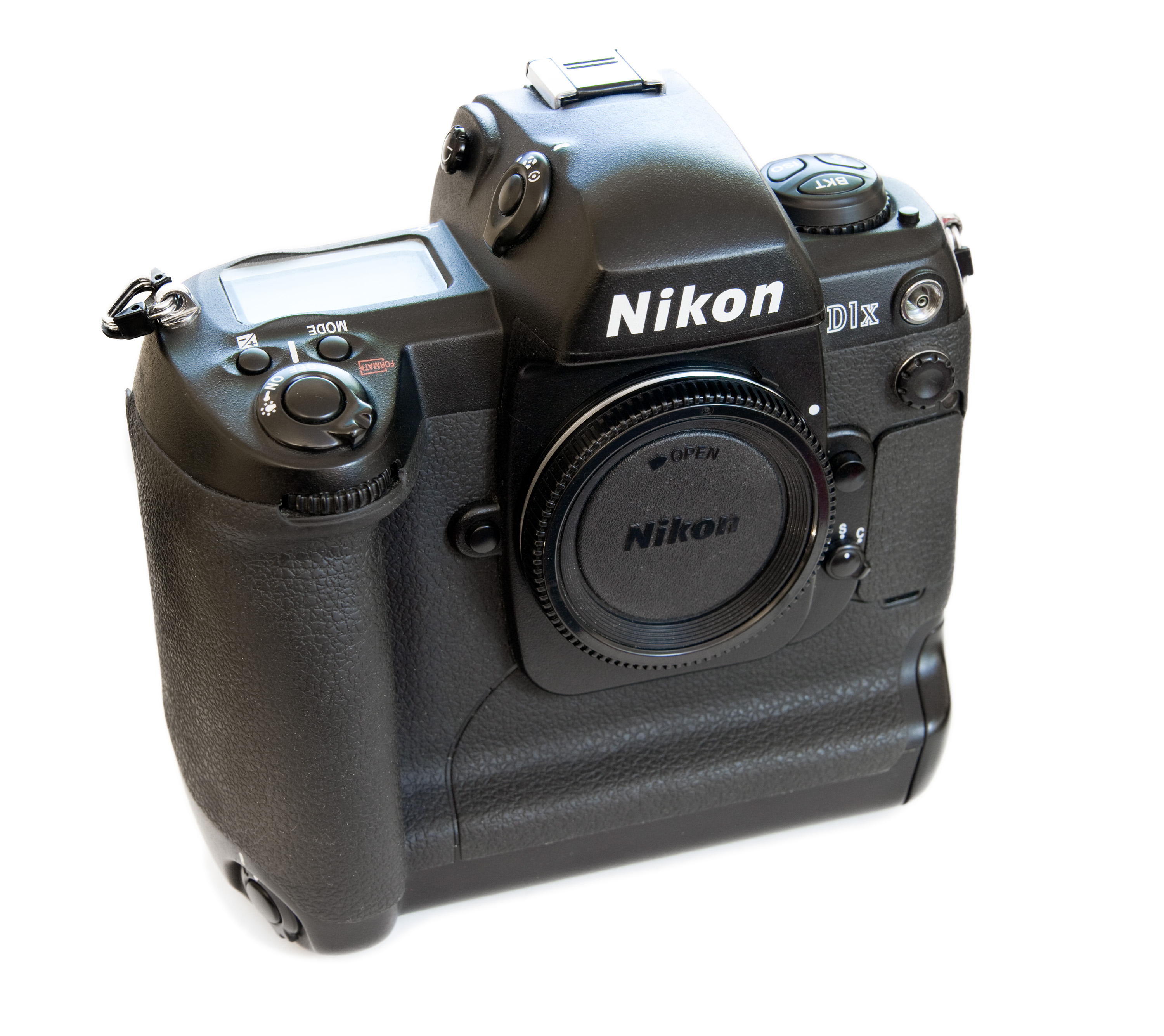
Nikon D1x. Uniquely for the D1 range, the D1x had a grey stripe on the handgrip (not pictured)

The original D1 was discontinued on February 5, 2001, being replaced by the D1H and D1X models. The D1X offered higher resolution than the D1's 2,000 x 1,312, having a 5.3 effective megapixels sensor (3,008 x 1,960) interpolated image output, and continuous shooting of 3 frames per second for up to 21 consecutive shots. The D1H is oriented towards fast-action photography, keeping the same 2.7 megapixels image sensor as the D1, but pushing the frame rate to 5 frame/s for up to 40 consecutive shots. Both the D1H and D1X use the sRGB/AdobeRGB color spaces, which is an improvement over the original D1.

== Development and sensor design ==
Development began on the D1 in 1996, when digital imaging was in its infancy in the consumer market. At that time the major market leader for DSLR cameras was Kodak, who produced their own image sensors and assembled digital cameras under the brand Kodak DCS. The DCS cameras were based upon 35 mm SLR cameras, replacing the film back with one incorporating a CCD sensor. This in turn was connected to a power supply and image processing and storage unit that is either carried separately or attached to the base of the camera body. While these cameras offer the convenience of digital imaging to normal photographers, their appeal was limited by huge price-tags and issues with sensor size, resolution, and performance in comparison to film.

Nikon therefore stood to gain a significant market advantage if they could manage to offer a digital camera that had been designed from the ground up. The goal was ambitious; Nikon sought to produce professional-grade cameras using large high-resolution sensors for only a few thousand dollars at a time when the Kodak DCS 460, based on a Nikon F90X and provided with a 6 megapixel 27.6 × 18.4 mm CCD sensor, was retailing for over US$30,000. Price was just one of the hurdles encountered; engineers also had to consider how to design and mass-produce a high-resolution and high-sensitivity sensor that could be powered by batteries and sustain a continuous frame-rate suitable for journalistic use.

Initially no major sensor manufacturer was prepared to produce the sensor for Nikon, believing that the predicted sales volumes were completely unrealistic. Eventually though a source was located and prototype designs entered production. Several years of refinement followed - working to reduce power use and improve read speeds - until a design was perfected.

The final design that is used in the D1 is a 23.7 × 15.6 mm CCD producing images with a final resolution of 2000 × 1312 pixels (approximately 2.7 megapixels), and this is the figure that was used for marketing the camera. The sensor was praised for its high base sensitivity of ISO 200, its excellent signal-to-noise ratio especially at base sensitivity, and its capacity for continuous shooting at five frames per second.

At the time, Bjørn Rørslett famously stated that the camera spelled "The End of The Beginning (of the digital era) - The Beginning of The End (of the film era)". The development of the D1 is generally accepted as one of the major milestones in the development of the digital camera, and Kodak's initial market dominance was genuinely threatened for the first time.

In a later "behind the scenes" interview published on the Nikon website it was revealed by the General Manager of Nikon's Imaging Development Management Department that the sensor developed for and used in the D1, and subsequently the D1H, actually used 10.8 million photosites rather than the 2.7 million that had previously been suggested. This allowed multiple photosites to be grouped together into units that formed the final pixels in the image, contributing to the sensor's high sensitivity and excellent signal-to-noise ratio.

Sensor	Class	'99	'00	'01	'02	'03	'04	'05	'06	'07	'08	'09	'10	'11	'12	'13	'14	'15	'16	'17	'18	'19	'20	'21	'22	'23	'24	'25	'26
FX (Full-frame)	Flagship											D3X ^{−P}																	
FX (Full-frame)	Flagship										D3 ^{−P}		D3S ^{−P}		D4		D4S		D5^{T}					D6^{T}					
FX (Full-frame)	Professional											D700 ^{−P}			D800/D800E			D810/D810A			D850 ^{AT}								
FX (Full-frame)	Enthusiast																Df												
FX (Full-frame)	Enthusiast																	D750 ^{A}					D780 ^{AT}						
FX (Full-frame)	Enthusiast															D600	D610												
DX (APS-C)	Flagship		D1^{−E}	D1X^{−E}				D2X^{−E}		D2Xs^{−E}																			
DX (APS-C)	Flagship		D1^{−E}	D1H ^{−E}			D2H^{−E}	D2Hs^{−E}																					
DX (APS-C)	Professional				D100^{−E}				D200^{−E}		D300^{−P}		D300S^{−P}						D500 ^{AT}										
DX (APS-C)	Enthusiast						D70^{−E}		D70s^{−E}	D80^{−E}		D90^{−E}		D7000 ^{−P}			D7100	D7200			D7500 ^{AT}								
DX (APS-C)	Upper-entry								D50^{−E}	D40X^{−E*}	D60^{−E*}		D5000^{A−P*}		D5100^{A−P*}	D5200^{A−P*}	D5300^{A*}	D5500^{AT*}		D5600 ^{AT*}									
DX (APS-C)	Entry-level									D40^{−E*}			D3000^{−E*}	D3100^{−P*}		D3200^{−P*}	D3300^{*}			D3400^{*}		D3500^{*}							
Early models		SVC (prototype; 1986); QV-1000C (1988); NASA F4 (1991); E2/E2S (1995); E2N/E2NS (1996); E3/E3S (1998)																											
Sensor	Class																												
Sensor	Class	'99	'00	'01	'02	'03	'04	'05	'06	'07	'08	'09	'10	'11	'12	'13	'14	'15	'16	'17	'18	'19	'20	'21	'22	'23	'24	'25	'26
