= Immanuel Lutheran College =

Immanuel Lutheran College may refer to:

- Immanuel Lutheran College (Hong Kong), a secondary school in Hong Kong
- Immanuel Lutheran College (North Carolina), a former a high school, college, and seminary in Greensboro, North Carolina
- Immanuel Lutheran College (Eau Claire), a high school, college, and seminary in Eau Claire, Wisconsin
- Immanuel Lutheran College, Buderim, a primary and secondary college run by the Lutheran Church of Australia

== See also ==
- Immanuel College (disambiguation)
