= Nikon F6 =

2004 35mm single-lens reflex camera

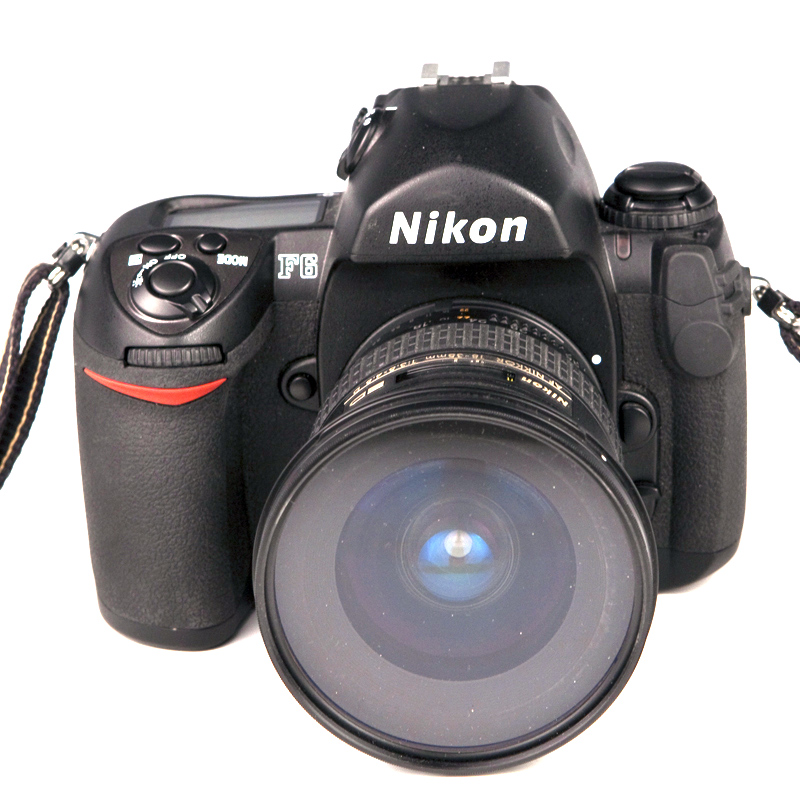

Overview
- Maker: Nikon
- Type: 35 mm SLR
- Released: 2004
- Production: 2004–2020; 17 years

Lens
- Lens mount: Nikon F-mount

Focusing
- Focus: TTL Phase Detection Autofocus (11 zone)

Exposure/metering
- Exposure: Program, shutter priority, aperture priority, manual

Flash
- Flash: External flash

Shutter
- Frame rate: 5.5 frame/s, 8 frame/s with external battery & grip

General
- Dimensions: 158×119×77.5 mm (6.22×4.69×3.05 in)
- Weight: 975 g (34.4 oz)
- Made in: Japan

Chronology
- Predecessor: Nikon F5
- Successor: None - final Nikon film SLR

The Nikon F6 is a 35 mm film single-lens reflex camera body manufactured by Nikon between 2004 and 2020. It was the sixth film camera in Nikon's 35mm F-series SLR line-up. Designed by Nikon, the model was manufactured at their Sendai plant.

The F6 was the most recent and final model in Nikon's F series. It replaced the Nikon F5, manufactured from 1996 to 2004. It can accept any Nikon F-mount lens with full metering functionality, excluding non-AI. The model was discontinued in October 2020. At the time it was discontinued, the F6 was the last remaining film SLR still in production.

== Camera features ==
- Focusing screen: B-type BriteView Clear Matte Screen II, interchangeable with six other optional focusing screens
- Viewfinder frame coverage: Approx. 100%
- Finder magnification: Approx. 0.74x with 50 mm lens set to infinity at -1.0m-1
- Autofocus: TTL phase detection, Nikon Multi-CAM2000 autofocus module
- Autofocus detection range: Approx. EV –1 to EV 19 (ISO 100, at normal temperature)
- Focus modes: Single Servo AF and Continuous Servo AF, and Manual
- Focus Tracking: Automatically activated in Single Servo AF or Continuous Servo AF
- Focus area: One — or a group — of 11 focus areas can be selected
- AF Area Modes: Single Area AF, Dynamic AF, Group Dynamic AF or Dynamic AF with Closest-Subject Priority selectable
- Focus lock: Focus is locked by pressing AE/AF-L button or lightly pressing shutter release button in Single Servo AF
- Exposure metering: Three built-in exposure meters — 3D Color Matrix, Center-Weighted and Spot
- Metering range (ISO 100, f/1.4 lens): EV 0 to EV 20 in 3D Color Matrix and Center-Weighted, EV 2 to EV 20 in Spot
- Exposure compensation: With exposure compensation button; ±5 EV range, in 1/3, 1/2 or 1 steps
- Auto Exposure Bracketing: Number of shots: 2-7; compensation steps: 1/3, 1/2, 2/3, or 1 EV steps
- Auto Exposure Lock: By pressing AE/AF-L button
- Film speed setting: DX or Manual selectable (manual setting has priority over DX detected film speed); DX: ISO 25-5000,
- Manual: ISO 6-6400 in 1/3 steps
- Shutter: Electronically controlled vertical-travel focal-plane shutter with built-in Shutter Monitor
- Shutter speeds: 30 to 1/8,000 s (1/3 steps in S and M modes); Bulb setting available in M mode (Shutter speed can be prolonged to 30 minutes in M mode)
- Accessory shoe: ISO518 hot-shoe contact digital data communication (sync contact, ready-light contact, TTL auto flash contact, monitor contact, GND), safety lock provided
- Sync contact: X-contact only; flash synchronization up to 1/250 s (up to 1/8,000 s possible in AUTO FP High-Speed Sync)
- Flash control: TTL flash control by combined five-segment TTL Multi Sensor with single-component IC and 1,005-pixel RGB sensor; i-TTL Balanced Fill-Flash with SB-800/600; Film speed range in TTL auto flash: ISO 25-1000
- Automatic film loading; automatic or manual film rewind

== Design ==
- Die-cast camera chassis, rear and film cover made of aluminium alloy
- The front, top and bottom covers are made of magnesium alloy.
- Parts made out of magnesium-alloy use the thixomold process.
- Remote shutter release: 10-pin terminal
- Redesigned tilted control wheels, shutter button and larger buttons.
- Detachable vertical grip housing and external battery pack.
- MV-1 data reader accessory - can transfer and save shooting metadata onto a CompactFlash memory card
- 100% coverage viewfinder

=== References ===
Class	1950s					1960s										1970s										1980s										1990s										2000s										2020s			
Class	55	56	57	58	59	60	61	62	63	64	65	66	67	68	69	70	71	72	73	74	75	76	77	78	79	80	81	82	83	84	85	86	87	88	89	90	91	92	93	94	95	96	97	98	99	00	01	02	03	04	05	06	07	08	09	...	20	21	22
Professional					F																					F3																																	
Professional																	F2												F3AF					F4								F5								F6									
High-end																													FA					F-801 (N8008)/ F-801s (N8008s)				F90 (N90)		F90X (N90s)					F100														
Mid-range																																F-501 (N2020)				F-601 (N6006)				F70 (N70)						F80 (N80)													
Mid-range																		EL / EL2 /ELW						FE					FE2							F-601M (N6000)				F70 (N70)						F80 (N80)													
Mid-range											FT		FTn/ FT2/ FT3										FM					FM2/FM2n																			FM3A												
Mid-range											FS												FM					FM2/FM2n																			FM3A												
Entry-level																																																											
Entry-level																																										Pronea S																	
Entry-level																																									Pronea 600i/6i																		
Entry-level								Nikkorex F / Nikkor J																	EM			FG			F-301 (N2000)				F-401s (N4004s)					F50 (N50)							F65 (N65 / U)		F75 (N75 / U2)										
Entry-level						35		35 II		Auto 35																				FG-20			F-401 (N4004)				F-401x (N5005)								F60 (N60)			F55 (N55)											
Entry-level									Zoom 35																																FM10 / FE10																		
Class	55	56	57	58	59	60	61	62	63	64	65	66	67	68	69	70	71	72	73	74	75	76	77	78	79	80	81	82	83	84	85	86	87	88	89	90	91	92	93	94	95	96	97	98	99	00	01	02	03	04	05	06	07	08	09	...	20	21	22
Class	1950s					1960s										1970s										1980s										1990s										2000s										2020s			
