= Shutter lag =

Delay when taking photos in photography

In photography, shutter lag is the delay between triggering the shutter and when the photograph is actually recorded, which includes all lag between when the shutter button is pressed and when the photo is taken, including metering and focus lag. It can be mitigated to an extent by pre-focusing and readying for action.

== Film cameras ==
In film cameras, the delay is caused by the mechanism inside the camera that opens the shutter, exposing the film. Because the process is mechanical, however, and relatively brief, shutter lag in film cameras is often only noticeable (and of any concern) to professionals. SLRs have a slight additional lag due to the time it takes to move the mirror out of the way.

== Digital cameras ==
Shutter lag is much more of a problem with digital cameras, although higher cost models tend to have less lag.

The comet-tail artifact that early CCD sensors suffered from was significantly reduced by the invention of the pinned photodiode (PPD). It was invented by Nobukazu Teranishi, Hiromitsu Shiraki and Yasuo Ishihara at NEC in 1980. The "pinned photodiode" is a photodetector structure used in almost all charge-coupled device (CCD) and CMOS image sensors (CIS) due to its low noise, high quantum efficiency and low dark current. In 1987, the PPD began to be incorporated into most CCD devices, becoming a fixture in consumer electronic video cameras and then digital still cameras. The PPD has since been used in most CCD sensors and then CMOS sensors.

Improvements in technology, such as the speed, bandwidth and power consumption of processor chips and memory, as well as CCD technology and then CMOS sensors, have made shutter lag less of a problem. While digital SLRs have achieved lag times around 50 ms by the late 2000s, some EVILs take half as long in the 2010s. That said, the lag times of some exceptional historic devices are still unsurpassed, see table below.

== Examples of various shutter lag times ==
Note that cameras offer increasingly varied choices of fully mechanical shutter, first-curtain electronic shutter (EFCS; meaning a mechanical shutter only at the end of the exposure), or fully electronic (thus silent) shutter. This is paired with either autofocus, fully manual focus, or prefocus (half-pressing the shutter button to engage autofocus and lock exposure; then holding the button half-pressed until the decisive picture-taking moment, in which the button is depressed completely). Typically, prefocus + EFCS results in the shortest shutter lag (see the following individual sources with measurements for all available modi).

This table quotes the shortest possible lag time of the respective camera. Note that variations may occur between manufacturer-claimed times and real-world measurements. In the case of follow-up versions of cameras (Mark II, -N, -s, ...), it is usually save to assume identical performance unless explicitly stated otherwise in press releases or comparisons.

Camera	Type	Shutter lag [ms]
Nikon Coolpix L3	Point-and-shoot (digital)	1800
Nikon Coolpix S550	Point-and-shoot (digital)	590
Panasonic DMC Lumix FS20	Point-and-shoot (digital)	480
Canon PowerShot A590 IS	Point-and-shoot (digital)	350
Samsung Nx-Mini	SLR (digital, APS)	164
Sony Cyber-shot DSC-W80	Point-and-shoot (digital)	150
Pentax MZ-50	SLR (Film)	120
Konica Minolta Maxxum 7D	SLR (digital, APS-C, built-in image stabilization)	117
Sony NEX-5	EVIL (APS)	115
Fujifilm GFX 50S	EVIL (44mm)	108
Fujifilm GFX 100	EVIL (44mm)	105
Fujifilm GFX 50R	EVIL (44mm)	102
Minolta Maxxum 9	SLR (Film)	90
Sigma SD1	SLR (APS)	88
Leica M8	Rangefinder (Digital, APS-H)	80
Leica M9	Rangefinder (Digital, 35mm)	80
Sony A850	SLR (digital, 35mm, built-in image stabilization)	74
Sony A900	SLR (digital, 35mm, built-in image stabilization)	72
Minolta XD-7	SLR (Film)	60
Nikon Z7 and Z6	EVIL (35mm)	59 and 56 respectively, 69-70 both
Canon EOS-5D Mark IV and 5DS	SLR (digital, 35mm)	57, 61-63
Canon EOS-1D X	SLR (digital, 35mm)	57-58, 36
Nikon Df	SLR (digital, 35mm)	55-57
Nikon D300s	SLR (digital, APS)	53
Sony Alpha SLT-A77	SLR (digital, APS, built-in image stabilization)	53
Canon EOS-1D Mark II	SLR (digital, APS-H)	53, 40
Canon EOS-1D Mark IV	SLR (digital, APS-H)	49
Leica SL 601	EVIL (35mm)	46
Nikon D700 and 800	SLR (digital, 35mm)	44, less than D500, 600, 610, 750, 810, and 850.
Nikon D3s	SLR (digital, 35mm)	43
Nikon D3x	SLR (digital, 35mm)	40
Nikon D5	SLR (digital, 35mm)	39, 43-57
Minolta XE-1	SLR (Film)	38
Nikon D2H, D2Hs, D2X	SLR (digital, APS)	37
Nikon F6	SLR (Film)	37
Contax RTS33	SLR (Film)	22
Sony A7 and A7 III	EVIL (35mm)	21-25, 23
Sony NEX-7, NEX-5N, a6x00 series	EVIL (APS)	20-25, 22
Sony A7r II	EVIL (35mm)	20, 21-26 (noticeably faster than the 163 ms of Mark 1; 3 ms faster than Mark 3 and 4)
Sony A7s	EVIL (35mm)	20-23
Leica M3	Rangefinder (Film)	16
Leica M7	Rangefinder (Film)	12
Sony Cyber-Shot DSC-F828	Point-and-shoot (digital)	9 = manufacturer claim. Note that Sony claims the same 9 ms for models P93, T33 and W1; ImagingResource tested them at 11 ms
Canon EOS RT	SLR (Film)	8
Canon EOS-1N RS	SLR (Film)	6
