= Canon EOS 650 =

1987 35mm single-lens reflex camera

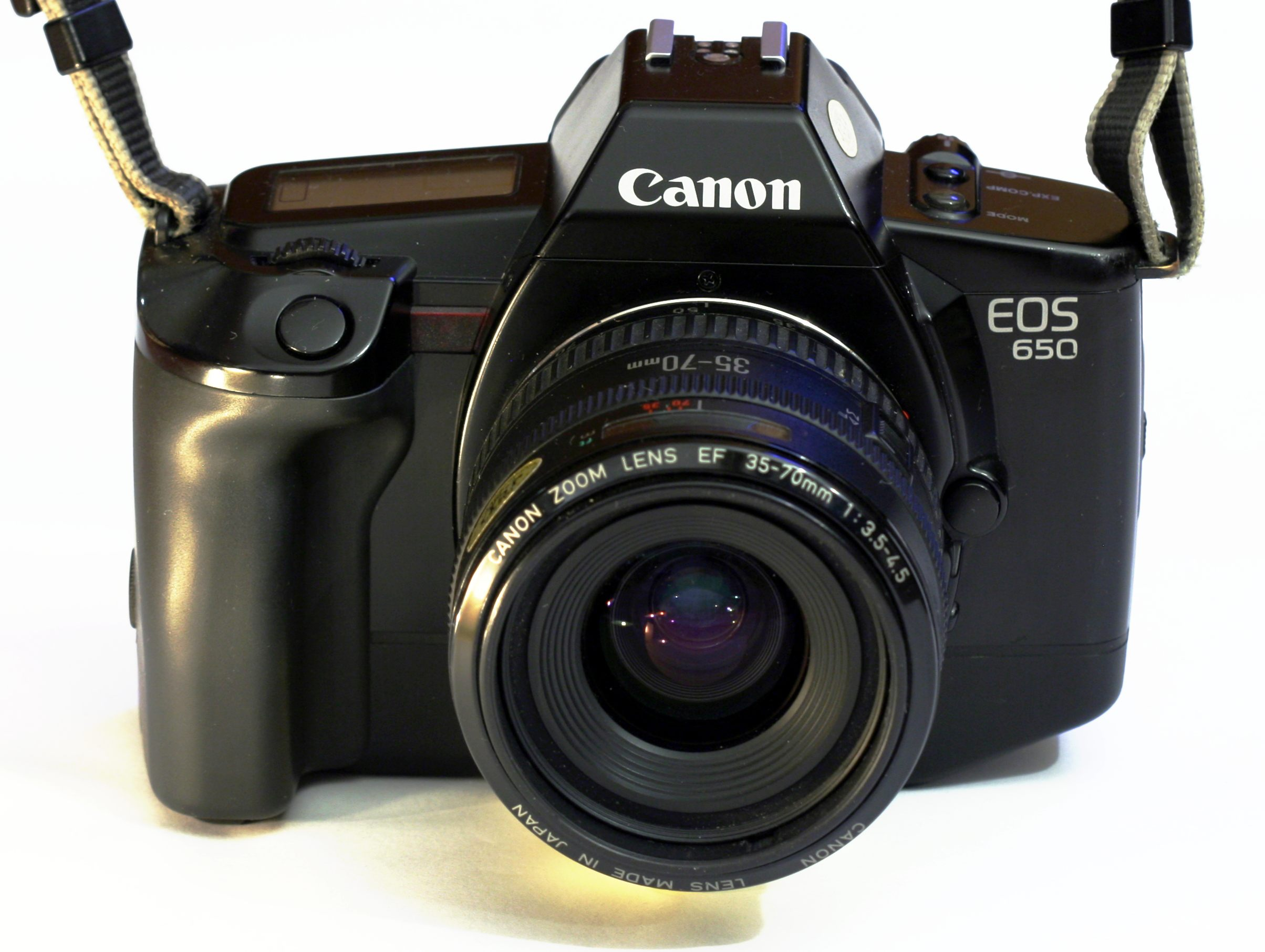

Overview
- Maker: Canon Inc.
- Type: Single-lens reflex
- Released: March 1987; 39 years ago
- Intro price: ¥80,000 (body only); ¥118,000 (with EF 35-70mm f/3.5-4.5)

Lens
- Lens mount: Canon EF
- Lens: Interchangeable

Sensor/medium
- Film format: 135 film
- Film size: 36 × 24 mm
- Film speed: ISO 6 – 6400

Focusing
- Focus: TTL phase detection autofocus

Exposure/metering
- Exposure: Program, Aperture priority, Shutter priority and depth-of-field autoexposure; match-needle manual 6 zone evaluative or 6.5% partial metering

Flash
- Flash: Hot shoe only

Shutter
- Frame rate: 3 frame/s
- Shutter speed range: 30s – 1/2000s

Viewfinder
- Viewfinder: Fixed eye-level pentaprism
- Viewfinder magnification: 0.8×
- Frame coverage: 94%

General
- Battery: 2CR5
- Dimensions: 148 mm × 108 mm × 68 mm (5.8 in × 4.3 in × 2.7 in)
- Weight: 660 g (23 oz)

The Canon EOS 650 is a 35 mm single-lens reflex camera. It was introduced on 2 March 1987, Canon's 50th anniversary, and discontinued in February 1989. It was the first camera in Canon's new EOS series, which was designed from scratch to support autofocus lenses. The EOS system features the new EF lens mount, which uses electrical signals to communicate between the camera and the lens. Focusing and aperture control are performed by electric motors mounted in the lens body. The EF mount is still used on Canon SLRs, including digital models. Canon's previous FD mount lenses are incompatible with EOS bodies.

Canon's first EOS camera had the latest technologies, including a microprocessor and a Canon-developed BASIS sensor for high-precision AF. Canon claimed incomparable autofocusing for the EOS 650. A range of high-precision ultrasonic motor EF autofocus lenses were also developed successfully for the 650.

An EOS 650 was used in 1992 to take the first photographic image that was uploaded on the World Wide Web, a picture of the band Les Horribles Cernettes.

The EOS 5D Mark III DSLR was announced on the 25th anniversary of the announcement of the EOS 650.

== Variants ==
The more advanced EOS 620 followed in May 1987, and the EOS 630/600 in March 1989. The 620 was equipped with LCD backlight, multiple exposure and auto-bracketing capability, and a higher flash sync speed of 1/250 and shutter speed of 1/4000. The 630/600 was the first EOS camera sold with different names in different markets (630 in Japan and USA, 600 in Europe) and the first available in multiple colors (the 630 in black or "metallic gray", the 600 only in "metallic gray"). All 630/600 models have faster autofocus with "focus prediction", 7 custom functions (including options for back-button focus and film leader out), 7 Programmed Image Control (PIC) modes and 5 frames per second film transport, an improvement from the 650's 3 fps. The Canon EOS RT is a pellicle mirror version of the EOS 630 with 8ms shutter lag and an additional eight custom functions (15 in total). Only 25,000 RT bodies were made.

Class	1987	1988	1989	1990	1991	1992	1993	1994	1995	1996	1997	1998	1999	2000	2001	2002	2003	2004	2005	2006	2007	…	2018
Professional				1					1N					1V									
Professional				RT					1N RS														
High-end				10			5						3										
Advanced		620		600		100				50					30				30V				
Midrange	650				1000F	1000F N		500			500N			300			300V		300X				
Entry-level		750	850	700					5000				3000			3000N		3000V					
Entry-level											IX												
Entry-level												IX 7											
