= Nikon GP-1 =

Global Positioning System accessory

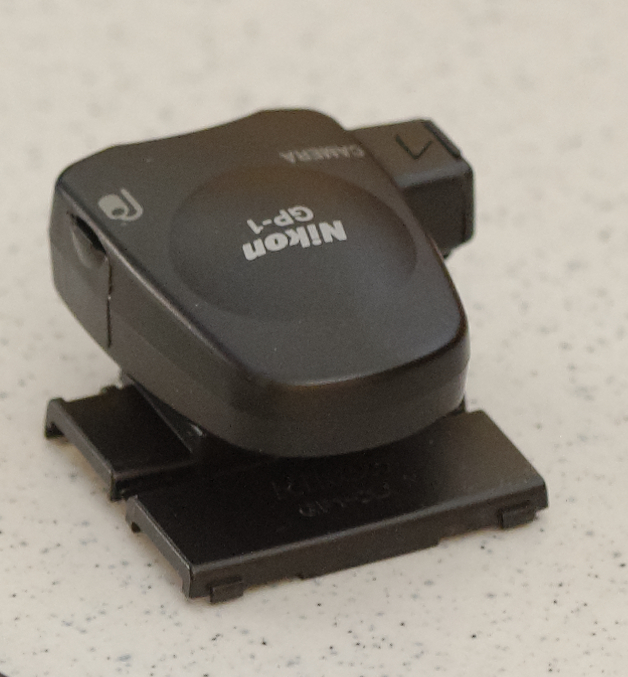
Nikon GP-1

The Nikon GP-1 is a Global Positioning System (GPS) accessory receiver manufactured by Nikon that collects geographic coordinate data and places it into the Exif data of a picture. It can also be configured to set & maintain the date & time of day in the camera. It connects to the camera via a proprietary cable and can be mounted on the flash shoe or on the camera strap via an included clip.

== Compatible cameras ==
The GP-1 is compatible with the following via the accessory terminal (CA90) cable:

- Nikon COOLPIX P7700
- Nikon D50
- Nikon D90
- Nikon D3100
- Nikon D3200
- Nikon D3300
- Nikon D5000
- Nikon D5100
- Nikon D5200
- Nikon D5300
- Nikon D5500
- Nikon D7000
- Nikon D7100
- Nikon D7200
- Nikon D600
- Nikon D610
- Nikon Df
- Nikon Z6
- Nikon Z6II
- Nikon Z6III
- Nikon Z7
- Nikon Z7II

The GP-1 is compatible with the following via the 10-pin terminal (CA10/CA10A) cable:

- Nikon D200
- Nikon D300
- Nikon D300s
- Nikon D500
- Nikon D700
- Nikon D750
- Nikon D800
- Nikon D800E
- Nikon D810
- Nikon D2Hs
- Nikon D2X
- Nikon D2Xs
- Nikon D3
- Nikon D3s
- Nikon D3X
- Nikon D4
- Nikon D4S
- Nikon D5
- Nikon Z8

== See also ==
- Nikon GP-N100
