= Nikon D3 =

2007 full-frame digital single-lens reflex camera

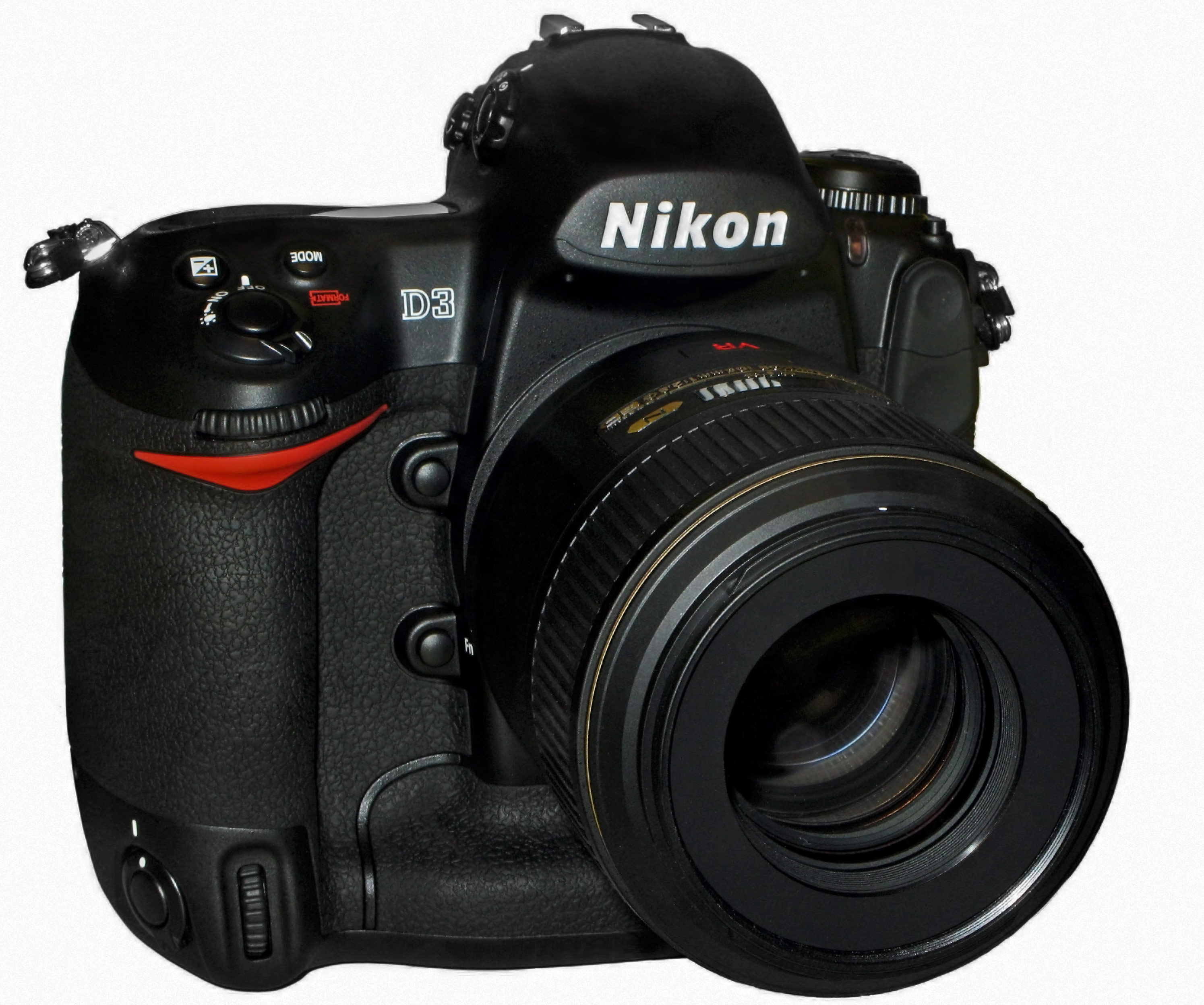

Overview
- Maker: Nikon
- Type: Digital single lens reflex camera
- Released: 23 August 2007

Lens
- Lens: Interchangeable, Nikon F mount

Sensor/medium
- Sensor: 36 mm × 23.9 mm CMOS, Nikon FX format
- Sensor maker: Nikon
- Maximum resolution: 12.0 effective megapixels (4,256 × 2,832 pixels)
- Film speed: ISO equivalency 200 to 6400 in 1/3, 1/2 or 1.0 EV steps, boosted: 100 to 25,600
- Recording medium: 2 CompactFlash (Type I or Type II)

Focusing
- Focus modes: Single Area AF, Dynamic AF with Focus Tracking and Lock-on, Closest Subject Priority, Group Dynamic AF
- Focus areas: 51 area TTL
- Focus bracketing: n/a

Exposure/metering
- Exposure modes: Program Auto [P], Shutter Priority Auto [S], Aperture Priority Auto [A], Manual [M]
- Exposure metering: TTL full aperture exposure metering system
- Metering modes: 3D Color Matrix Metering II, Centre Weighted, Spot

Flash
- Flash: n/a
- Flash bracketing: n/a

Shutter
- Shutter: Electromagnetically controlled vertical travel focal plane shutter
- Shutter speed range: 30 to 1/8000 second and bulb
- Continuous shooting: 9 frame/s up to 17/64 (RAW/JPEG Fine), 11 frame/s for DX mode (without autofocus)

Viewfinder
- Viewfinder: Optical type fixed eye level pentaprism, 100% coverage

Image processing
- White balance: Auto, Presets (5), Manual, and Color temperature in kelvins
- WB bracketing: 2 to 9 frames, 10, 20, 30 MIRED steps

General
- LCD screen: 3 inch, 307,000 pixels (922,000 dots), VGA
- Battery: Lithium ion EN-EL4a
- Optional battery packs: AC adapter EH-6
- Weight: 1,240 g (2.73 lb)
- Made in: Japan

Chronology
- Successor: Nikon D3S

The Nikon D3 is a 12.0-megapixel professional-grade full frame (35 mm) digital single lens reflex camera (DSLR) announced by the Nikon Corporation on 23 August 2007 along with the Nikon D300 DX format camera. It was Nikon's first full-frame DSLR. The D3, along with the Nikon D3X, was a flagship model in Nikon's line of DSLRs, superseding the D2Hs and D2Xs. It was replaced as Nikon's flagship DSLR in October 2009 by the D3S. The D3, D3X, D3S, D4, D4s, D5, D6, D700, D800, D800Е and Df are the only Nikon FX format DSLRs manufactured in Japan. The D3S was replaced by the D4 in 2012.

== Technology ==
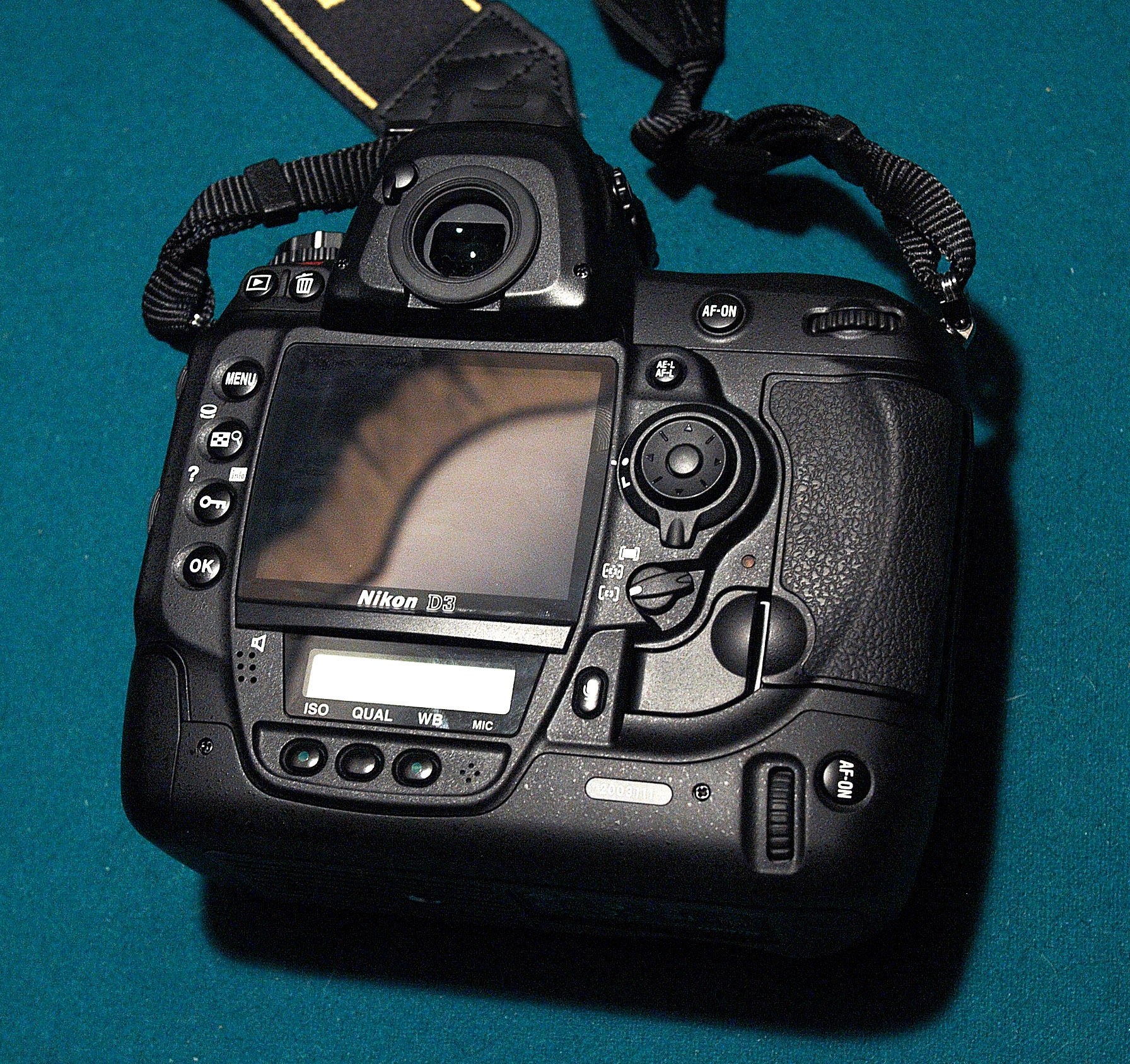
Nikon D3

The D3 features a full-frame 35 mm equivalent CMOS image sensor measuring 23.9 mm × 36.0 mm. This sensor is larger than the DX format sensors of all previous Nikon DSLRs, and Nikon has coined the term "FX format" to describe it. While the D3's sensor has larger pixels than some previous DX sensors, some previous DX sensors have larger pixels. The design of the D3's CMOS sensor allows for greater light sensitivity than previous DX CCD sensors. This allows the camera to reach higher equivalent film speeds and produce images with less noise in low light situations. Low light situations include times when the camera is operated at high shutter speed or high f number, where the lens' aperture is reduced to improve depth of field and sharpness. The sensor captures image data at 14 bits per color channel through 12-channel parallel readout, which ensures 9 frame/s continuous shooting with higher bit depth than that on previous 12-bit sensors.

Processed with the new Nikon EXPEED engine, the Live View mode in D3, along with D300, was Nikon's first implementation in its DSLR line-up. D3 also uses a stepper motor in aperture coupling mechanism for the first time, allowing real time depth of field control in Live View with exposure preview and live histogram functions. Additionally, D3 provides a lossless algorithm applied to RAW file along with uncompressed and lossy-compressed format.

The camera grip and body style were designed by Giorgetto Giugiaro's Italdesign. The camera body uses the Nikon F mount, making it compatible with older Nikon lenses. Other features include 9 frames per second in FX and 11 frames in DX and a large and bright LCD screen.

Three firmware updates have been released for the D3. The latest firmware version is 2.02. In this firmware version, the maximum ISO sensitivity allowed under Automatic ISO can be modified in increments the same as the manual ISO settings can, and automatic White balance and focus tracking are improved. In the 2.01 firmware update, automatic correction of lateral chromatic aberration is standardized, and Vignetting ("Vignette control"), lens distortion ("Distortion") correction, as well as image rotation ("Straighten") via playback ("Retouch") menu, are made possible.

The Nikon D3 has a hardware interface for direct geotagging with Nikon GP-1 GPS.

== Audience ==
The D3 is Nikon's first full frame DSLR. Full frame can either offer greater resolution or larger pixels for improved sensitivity; in the D3, Nikon opted for a lower resolution, higher sensitivity solution. For additional resolution, the D3x was introduced. Full frame sensors also maintain the traditional focal lengths and depth of field associated with 35mm camera systems. Because it is Nikon's first such camera, it does not succeed or replace another camera model. Other professional-grade Nikon models included the D2Xs and D2Hs.

The camera has a vertical grip in addition to the standard horizontal grip.

When Nikon announced the D3, it was priced at US$4999, but present prices are much lower. In July 2008 the D3x's larger buffer memory was offered as an upgrade to D3 owners, doubling its continuous shooting capacity. This modification represents approximately 10% of the original cost of the camera. New D3 bodies still ship with the original buffer memory; upgraded models can be identified with a "2x" label in the storage card door.

As many other Nikon film SLR (various modified Nikon F, F3, F4, F5) and digital DSLR cameras like the Nikon NASA F4, Nikon based Kodak DCS 460, DCS 660 and DCS 760, Nikon D1, D2X and D2Xs, the D3 is used by NASA, for example in Space Shuttle missions to the International Space Station.

== Reception ==
Popular Photography magazine determined that the Nikon D3 camera has excellent control of noise and can shoot in very low light at high ISO speeds with very usable results.

The DxOMark Sensor rankings issued by DxO Labs placed the Nikon D3 at fourth place behind two medium-format cameras from Phase One and the subsequent Nikon D3X.

The Nikon D3 was also tested by many independent reviewers.

== Nikon D3X ==
The D3X is a higher resolution version of the D3 which was announced in December 2008. It features a 24.5 megapixel sensor, an ISO range of 50–6400, and a new image processing system.

== Nikon D3s ==
The D3S was announced in October 2009. It features a redesigned 12.1 megapixel sensor, raises the maximum ISO up to 102,400 (equivalent), image sensor cleaning and adds a 720p video mode.

== See also ==
- Nikon D700
- Nikon D3X
- Nikon D3S

Sensor	Class	1999	2000	2001	2002	2003	2004	2005	2006	2007	2008	2009	2010	2011	2012	2013	2014	2015	2016	2017	2018	2019	2020	2021	2022	2023	2024	2025	2026
FX (Full-frame)	Flagship											D3X ^{−P}																	
FX (Full-frame)	Flagship										D3 ^{−P}		D3S ^{−P}		D4		D4S		D5^{T}					D6^{T}					
FX (Full-frame)	Professional											D700 ^{−P}			D800/D800E			D810/D810A			D850 ^{AT}								
FX (Full-frame)	Enthusiast																Df												
FX (Full-frame)	Enthusiast																	D750 ^{A}					D780 ^{AT}						
FX (Full-frame)	Enthusiast															D600	D610												
DX (APS-C)	Flagship		D1^{−E}	D1X^{−E}				D2X^{−E}		D2Xs^{−E}																			
DX (APS-C)	Flagship		D1^{−E}	D1H ^{−E}			D2H^{−E}	D2Hs^{−E}																					
DX (APS-C)	Professional				D100^{−E}				D200^{−E}		D300^{−P}		D300S^{−P}						D500 ^{AT}										
DX (APS-C)	Enthusiast						D70^{−E}		D70s^{−E}	D80^{−E}		D90^{−E}		D7000 ^{−P}			D7100	D7200			D7500 ^{AT}								
DX (APS-C)	Upper-entry								D50^{−E}	D40X^{−E*}	D60^{−E*}		D5000^{A−P*}		D5100^{A−P*}	D5200^{A−P*}	D5300^{A*}	D5500^{AT*}		D5600 ^{AT*}									
DX (APS-C)	Entry-level									D40^{−E*}			D3000^{−E*}	D3100^{−P*}		D3200^{−P*}	D3300^{*}			D3400^{*}		D3500^{*}							
Early models		SVC (prototype; 1986); QV-1000C (1988); NASA F4 (1991); E2/E2S (1995); E2N/E2NS (1996); E3/E3S (1998)																											
Sensor	Class																												
Sensor	Class	1999	2000	2001	2002	2003	2004	2005	2006	2007	2008	2009	2010	2011	2012	2013	2014	2015	2016	2017	2018	2019	2020	2021	2022	2023	2024	2025	2026
