= Pellicle mirror =

Light, semi-transparent mirror

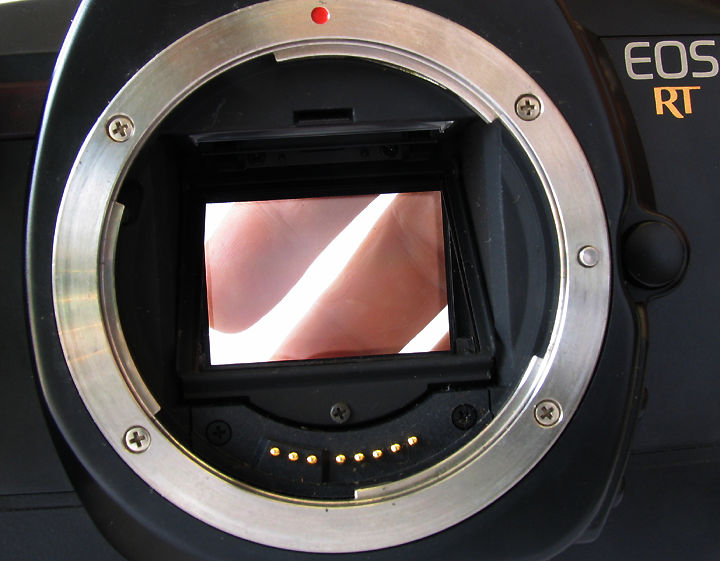
The pellicle mirror of the Canon EOS RT

A pellicle mirror is an ultra-thin, ultra-lightweight semi-transparent mirror employed in the light path of an optical instrument, splitting the light beam into two separate beams, both of reduced light intensity. Splitting the beam allows its use for multiple purposes simultaneously. The thinness of the mirror practically eliminates beam or image doubling due to a non-coincident weak second reflection from the nominally non-reflecting surface, a problem with mirror-type beam splitters. The name pellicle is a diminutive of pellis, a skin or film.

== In photography ==
In photography, the pellicle mirror has been employed in single-lens reflex (SLR) cameras, at first to enable through-the-lens exposure measurement and possibly to reduce camera shake, but later most successfully to enable fast series photography, which otherwise would be slowed down by the movement of the reflex mirror, while maintaining constant finder vision.

The first use of pellicle mirrors for consumer photography however were in color separation cameras. The Devin Tricolor Camera from at least the 1938 version used two pellicle mirrors plus three color filters to split the image from a single lens into three images of the three additive primary colors. Pellicle mirrors are ideal for this purpose, even today, since they are lighter and cheaper than an optical block of dichroic prisms, which would be heavy and expensive for large, high resolution film or plates.

The conventional SLR camera has a reflex mirror directing the light beam from the lens to the focusing screen in the viewfinder, which is swung out of the light path when the exposure is made and causing the viewfinder to go dark. This action adds a delay between pressing the shutter release and the actual exposure of the film.

The first camera to employ the pellicle mirror as a beam splitter for the viewfinder was the Canon Pellix, launched by Canon Camera Company Inc. Japan in 1965. The object was to accomplish exposure measurement through the lens (TTL), which was pioneered by Tokyo Kogaku KK, Japan in the 1963 Topcon RE Super. That employed a CdS meter cell placed behind the reflex mirror that had narrow slits cut into the surface to let the light reach the cell. Canon improved on the idea by making the mirror semi-translucent and fixed. The meter cell was swung into the light-path behind the mirror by operating a lever on the right-hand camera front for stopped down exposure reading, momentarily dimming the viewfinder. Two thirds of the light from the camera lens was let through the mirror, while the rest was reflected up to the viewfinder screen. The Pellix pellicle mirror was an ultra-thin (0.02 mm) Mylar film with a vapour deposited semi reflecting layer. Since there was no mirror blackout, the user could see the image at the moment of exposure.

The next 35mm SLR camera to employ the pellicle mirror was the Canon F-1 High Speed, made available in the event of the 1972 Olympic games, the object being rapid series photography, difficult at the time to obtain with a moving mirror. The mirror design was the same as in the Pellix. In 1984, Canon released another version of their then "New F-1", which attained a record 14 frames per second performance, being the fastest analog SLR of that time.

Nippon Kogaku KK, Japan introduced their high-speed Nikon F2H in 1976. The mirror is a pellicle rather than a conventional front surfaced mirror that swings out of the light path when the exposure is made. To identify the F2H, note the shutter speed dial has no T, B or 1/2000; has no self-timer and has a non-removable Type B focusing screen.

Two further Canon models were produced with pellicle mirrors, the EOS RT and the EOS-1N RS, the RT being based on the EOS 600/EOS 630 and the 1N RS being based on the EOS-1N.

As development of SLR cameras has progressed since these early models, fast sequence shooting has apparently become possible using ordinary moving mirrors in high-speed cameras, getting rid of the vulnerable pellicle mirror that was prone to dust and dirt. The mirror mechanism of conventional SLR cameras has improved since the Pellix mirror was introduced; the viewfinder is dark for only a very short time, the shutter lag is small, and the mirror-return is fast enough for rapid shooting. Digital SLR cameras are able to take ten frames or more per second employing an instant-return mirror.

=== Sony SLT concept ===
Sony has introduced cameras with plastic pellicle-like mirrors, which it describes as "Single-Lens Translucent" cameras. These cameras divert a portion of incoming light to a phase-detection autofocus unit, while the remaining light strikes a digital image sensor. Sony "SLT" cameras employ an electronic viewfinder (EVF) allowing exposure value, white balance and other settings to be verified and adjusted visually before taking a picture, although typically the EVF displays far less dynamic range than the sensor. The refresh rate of the viewfinder is limited by the time it takes the sensor to make a usable exposure; thus in low light the frame rate of the viewfinder may be as low as four frames per second. "SLT" cameras also lack a real-time view at high shooting rates, when the viewfinder shows the last picture taken instead of the one being taken — a phenomenon comparable to certain older SLRs that can only achieve their maximum burst rate in mirror lock-up.

=== Motion-picture cameras ===
Few film movie cameras have been made that make use of the pellicle mirror. Probably the earliest is the Pathé WEBO M, m for membrane, of 1946. With that camera light is reflexed sideways into a primary plano-convex finder lens, the plane side being partially or fully matted. Another French amateur movie camera with a pellicle is the Christen Reflex for Double-Eight film. It was made from 1960 on and provides a lightly slanted deflection. Later, in 1967, the professional Mitchell NCR and BNCR cameras were equipped with a pellicle-based finder. In the Soviet Union in 1970 appeared the Kiev 16 Alpha, also featuring a pellicle mirror finder system that deflects strictly vertically.

=== Advantages and disadvantages ===
Advantages of a pellicle mirror:

- The user has an uninterrupted view through the viewfinder while making an exposure.
- There is no vibration from mirror movement, reducing shake and audible noise. At the same time, the system is devoid of play or backlash.
- Shutter lag may be diminished, and pictures taken at a faster rate, compared to systems employing a reflex mirror.
- Continuous phase-detection autofocus during video, live view or continuous shooting mode.

Disadvantages of a pellicle mirror:

- The pellicle mirror causes an up to 1/3-stop loss of light at the receptor, and a corresponding 2-stop loss of light in the viewfinder
- The mirror has to be kept perfectly clean, or the light sensor and other electronics (as well as the image quality) will suffer.
- Owing to its thinness, the pellicle mirror is fragile, making it difficult to clean.
- As the viewfinder does not go dark, there is no visual indication that the shutter has fired. This could be a problem in a noisy environment where the shutter cannot be heard.

=== Cameras ===
- Devin Colorgraph Company
  - Devin Tricolor Camera (1938)
- Thoams S. Curtis Laboratories
  - Curtis Color-Scout (1941) was an aluminum bodied 2¼” x 3¼” one shot tricolor camera
- Canon
  - Canon Pellix (1965)
  - Canon Pellix QL (1966)
  - Canon F-1 High Speed Motor Drive (for the 1972 Winter Olympics)
  - Canon New F-1 High Speed Motor Drive (for the 1984 Summer Olympics)
  - Canon EOS RT (1989)
  - Canon EOS-1N RS (1994)
- Nikon
  - Nikon F High Speed (1976)
  - Nikon F2H (1978)
  - Nikon F3H (for the 1998 Nagano Olympics)
- Sony
  - Sony α33 (SLT-A33) (2010)
  - Sony α35 (SLT-A35) (2011)
  - Sony α37 (SLT-A37) (2012)
  - Sony α55 (SLT-A55) / Sony α55V (SLT-A55V) (2010)
  - Sony α57 (SLT-A57) (2012)
  - Sony α58 (SLT-A58) (2013)
  - Sony α65 (SLT-A65) / Sony α65V (SLT-A65V) (2011)
  - Sony α68 (ILCA-68) (2015)
  - Sony α77 (SLT-A77) / Sony α77V (SLT-A77V) (2014)
  - Sony α77 II (ILCA-77M2) (2014)
  - Sony α99 (SLT-A99) / Sony α99V (SLT-A99V) (2012)
  - Sony α99 II (ILCA-99M2) (2016)

	1960s										1970s										1980s										1990s									
	0	1	2	3	4	5	6	7	8	9	0	1	2	3	4	5	6	7	8	9	0	1	2	3	4	5	6	7	8	9	0	1	2	3	4	5	6	7	8	9
Canon						Pellix	Canon Pellix QL						Canon F-1 HS Motor Drive												Canon New F-1 HS Motor Drive					Canon EOS RT						Canon EOS 1N RS				
Nikon																	Nikon F HS		Nikon F2H																				Nikon F3H	
