= Nikon D300 =

2007 DX-format digital single-lens reflex camera

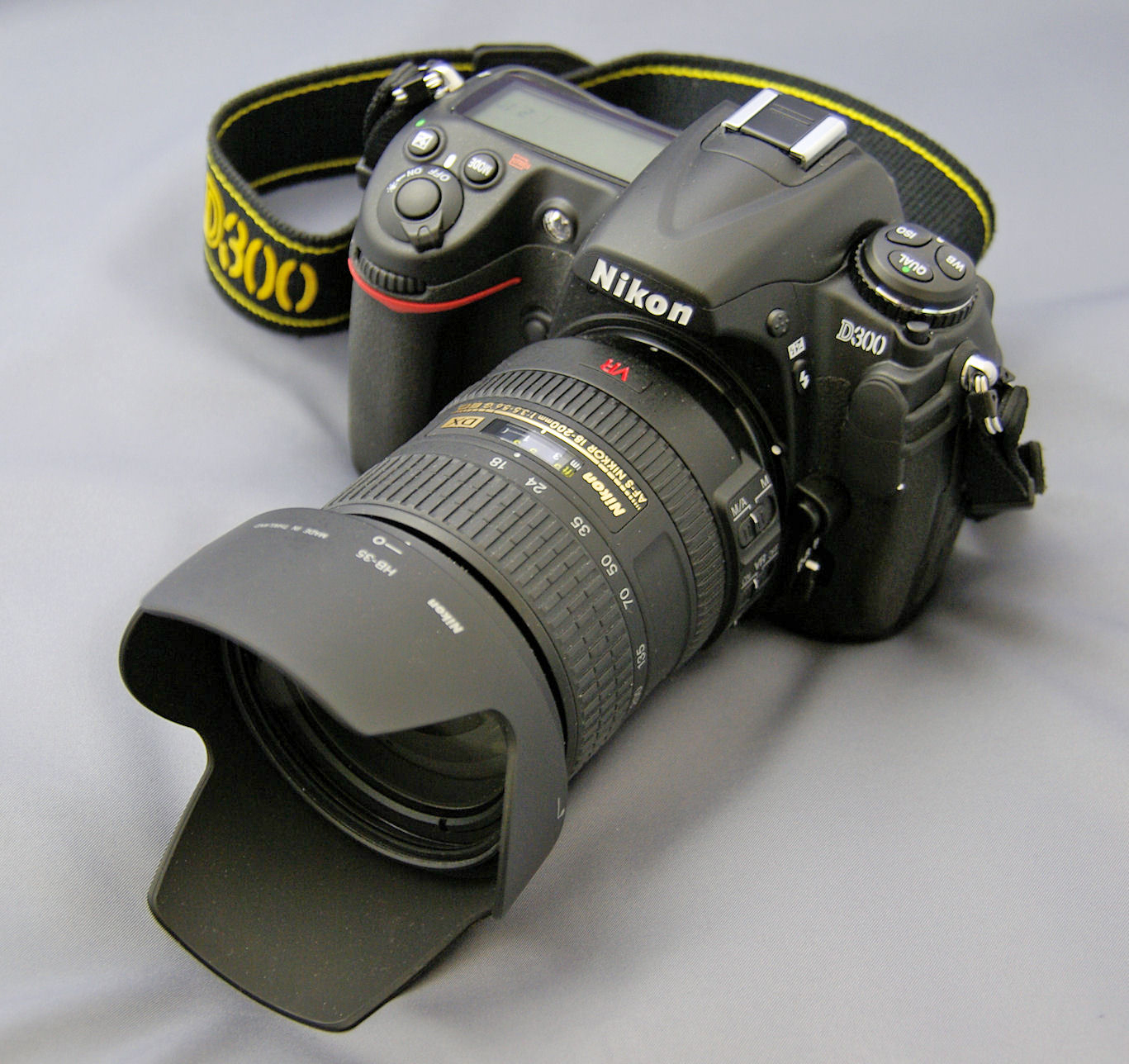
- Nikon D300 with AF-S Nikkor 18-200mm VR lens

Overview
- Maker: Nikon
- Type: Digital single-lens reflex

Lens
- Lens mount: Nikon F-mount
- Lens: Interchangeable, Nikon F-mount

Sensor/medium
- Sensor: Nikon DX format 23.6 mm × 15.8 mm CMOS
- Maximum resolution: 4,288 × 2,848 (13.1 M/12.3 M pixels sensor/effective)
- Film speed: 200–3200 in 1, 1/2 or 1/3 EV steps (down to 100 and up to 6400 as expansion)
- Recording medium: CompactFlash (Type I or Type II) or Hitachi Microdrive

Focusing
- Focus modes: Instant single-servo AF (S), continuous-servo AF (C), manual (M)
- Focus areas: 9, 21 and 51 points, 51 point 3D tracking, 15 cross-type sensors

Exposure/metering
- Exposure modes: Programmed Auto [P] with flexible program; Shutter-Priority Auto [S]; Aperture Priority Auto [A]; Manual [M]
- Exposure metering: Three-mode through-the-lens (TTL) exposure metering
- Metering modes: 3D Color Matrix Metering II, Center-weighted and Spot

Flash
- Flash: Manual pop-up with button release Guide number 12/39 (ISO 100, m/ft)
- Flash bracketing: 3 to +1 EV in increments of 1/3 or 1/2 EV

Shutter
- Shutter: Electronically controlled vertical-travel focal plane shutter
- Shutter speed range: 30 s – 1/8000 s, bulb
- Continuous shooting: 6 frame/s (8 with AC Adapter or Multi-Power Battery Pack with AA or EN-EL4 battery), 6 with Li-ion Battery, up to 100 frames (JPEG normal/large)

Viewfinder
- Viewfinder: Optical, 100% frame coverage

Image processing
- Image processor: Expeed
- White balance: Auto, Six presets, Manual preset (four), Kelvin temperature, Fine tunable
- WB bracketing: 2 to 9 frames in increments of 1, 2 or 3

General
- LCD screen: 3-inch TFT LCD with 307,200 pixels (921,600 dots)
- Battery: Nikon EN-EL3e Lithium-Ion battery
- Optional battery packs: MB-D10 battery pack with one Nikon EN-EL3e or eight AA batteries. An optional carrier can hold a Nikon EN-EL4 or EN-EL4a battery.
- Weight: About 825 g (1.819 lb) without battery, memory card, body cap, or monitor cover
- Made in: Thailand

Chronology
- Predecessor: Nikon D200
- Successor: Nikon D300S

The Nikon D300 is a 12.3-megapixel semi-professional DX format digital single-lens reflex camera that Nikon Corporation announced on 23 August 2007 along with the Nikon D3 FX format camera. The D300 was discontinued by Nikon on September 11, 2009, being replaced by the modified Nikon D300S, which was released July 30, 2009. The D300S remained the premier Nikon DX camera until the D7100 was released in early 2013.

== Features ==
The D300 was designated by Nikon as the ultimate in DX format performance. It is quite similar to the D700, with the main difference being that the D300 uses a DX sensor instead of an FX sensor. It offers both high resolution and high speed (being able to capture 6 frames per second, and 8 frames per second with the addition of an optional MB-D10 battery pack).

The D300 has not only a built-in autofocus motor for all Nikon autofocus-lenses, but includes CPU and metering for older Nikon F-mount AI/AI-S lenses and the new generation perspective control lenses (PC-E).

The built-in intervalometer (timer) can be used for time-lapse low-light movies.

== Specifications ==
- Nikon DX format 12.3-megapixel CMOS sensor
- 1.5x field of view crop
- Large, bright viewfinder with approximately 100% frame coverage and approximately 0.94 magnification
- Nikon EXPEED image processor
- Magnesium alloy weather-sealed body
- Nikon F-mount lenses
- Active D-Lighting (three levels)
- 3D Color Matrix Metering II, using a 1005-pixel RGB sensor. Including matrix, center-weight, and spot metering with AI and AIS manual focus lenses produced since 1977
- Automatic correction of lateral chromatic aberration
- Retouch menu includes filter type, hue, crop, D-lighting, Mono (Black and White, Cyanotype or Sepia)
- Multi-CAM 3500DX autofocus module with 51 sensors in normal mode; Single Servo and Continuous Servo focus modes, advanced focus tracking modes, selectable Single Area AF, Dynamic area AF, Group Dynamic AF, and Closest Subject Priority Dynamic AF
- Live-View Mode
- Built-in sensor cleaning (using ultrasound) helps to remove the dust from sensor
- 6 frame-per-second continuous shooting for up to 100 JPEG, up to 8 frame-per-second with optional MB-D10 battery grip with eight AA batteries, EN-EL4 or EN-EL4a battery installed
- 3.0 inch 921,600 dots LCD (640 × 480 VGA, 307,200 RGB pixels resolution)
- 10-pin remote and flash sync terminals on camera
- GPS interface for direct geotagging supported by Nikon GP-1
- EN-EL3e lithium-ion battery 7.4 V/1500 MAH offering up to 1800 shots per charge, according to Nikon; with advanced battery information available in camera menus
- ISO 200–3200, selectable in 1/3, 1/2 or 1 stop increments. Additionally ISO 100 and ISO 6400 are available with ISO Boost. Selectable in-camera ISO noise reduction, applied in post-processing.
- Built-in Speedlight offers balanced fill-flash with Nikon's i-TTL flash system, and can fire in commander mode for wireless off-camera firing of other speedlights; controlling up to two groups of speedlights with individual exposure compensation
- File formats include JPEG, TIFF, NEF (Nikon's raw image format compressed and uncompressed), and JPEG+NEF (JPEG size/quality selectable)
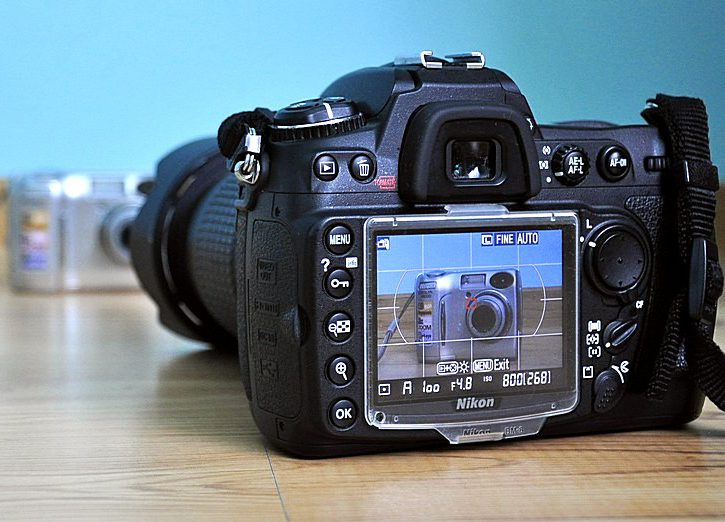
Live View of image on LCD screen

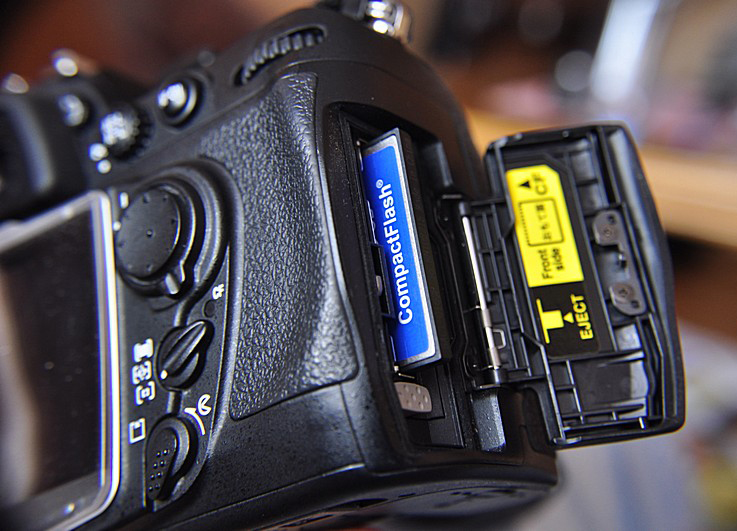
CompactFlash memory card inside D300

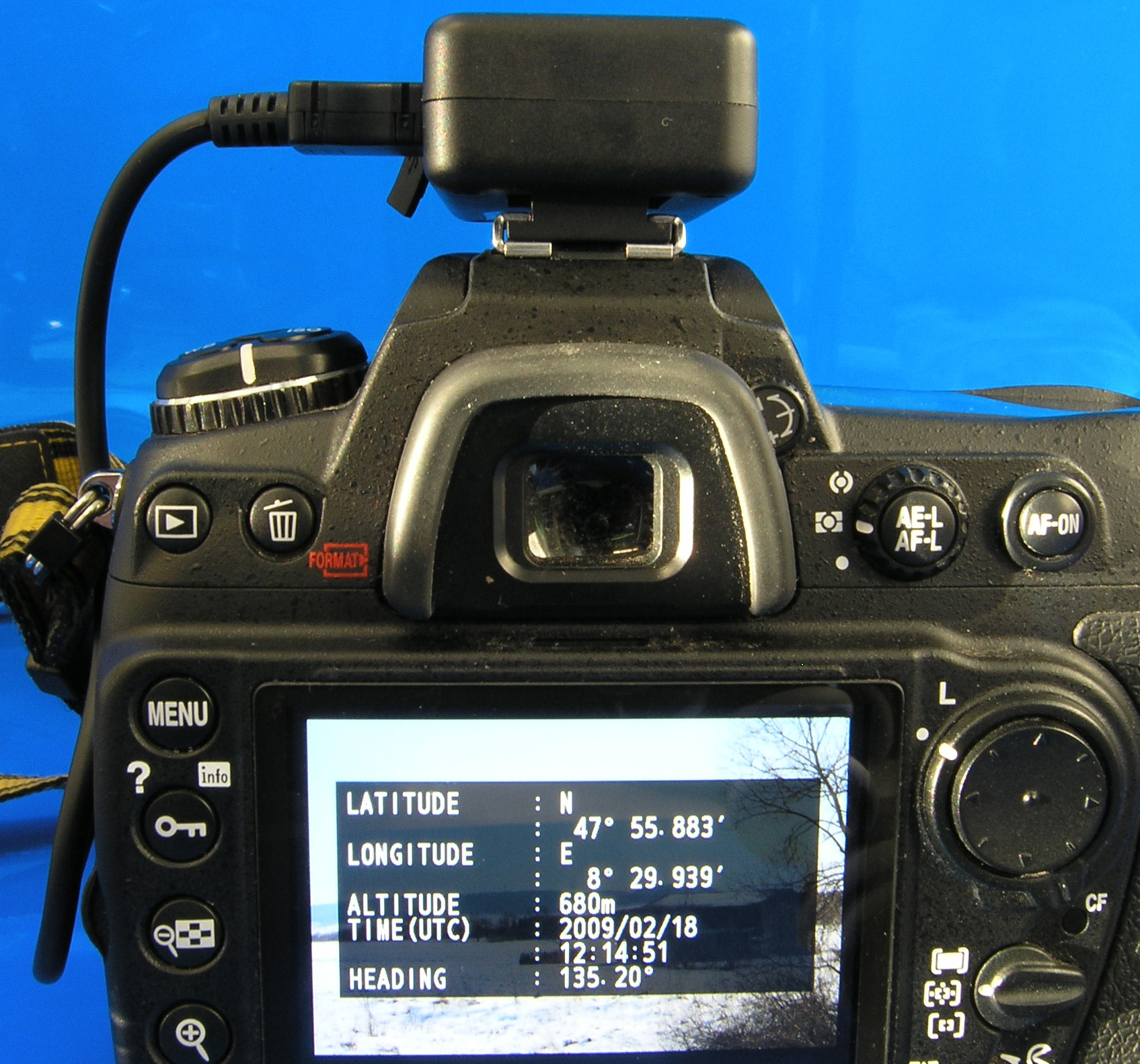
Nikon D300 with "Solmeta Geotagger N2 Kompass" on top

== Reception ==
The Nikon D300 was announced on August 23, 2007. Shutterbug Magazine, and the UK magazine, "What Digital Camera" presented initial 'First Look' reviews. Imaging Resource and Photocrati also did their own initial reviews. DCR and Camera Labs have full reviews of the D300. Digital Review Canada compares it to the older Nikon D200. Popular Photography named the Nikon D300 for their official "Camera of the Year 2007" award. The magazine also reviewed the camera, and noted at that time that Nikon Capture NX software was packaged with the camera; more recent packages include a 30-day trial version.

== Accessories and software upgrades ==
=== MB-D10 Multi Power Battery Pack ===
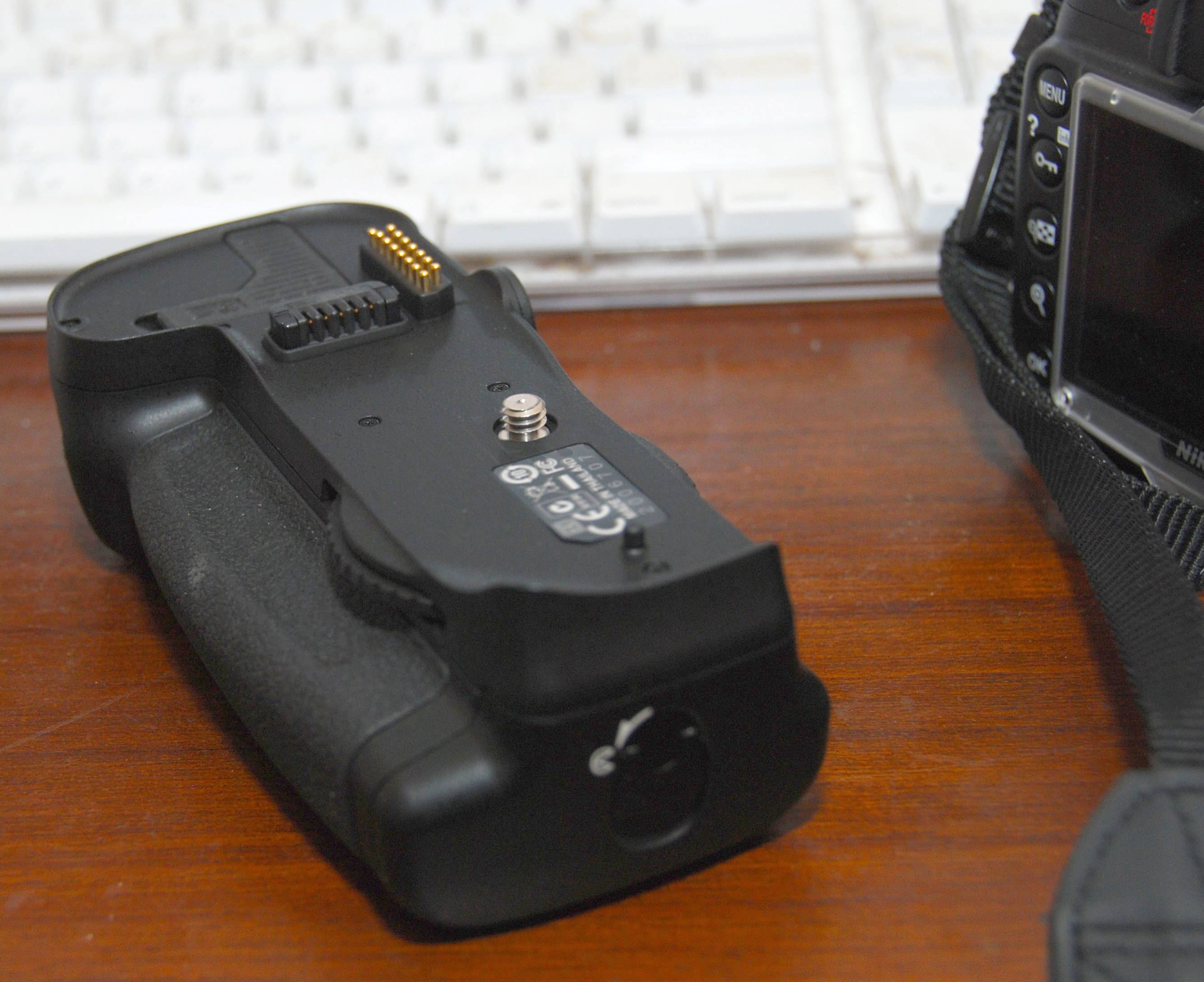
MB-D10 Battery Pack

The MB-D10 is an optional accessory battery pack that provides a vertical grip as well as additional shutter release and autofocus buttons, command dials and focus point selection control.

The MB-D10 allows the D300 to be powered by an additional EN-EL3e battery or AA batteries. An optional carrier is available which allows for an EN-EL4 or EN-EL4a battery to be installed instead. The camera can be configured to assign priority to either the internal EN-EL3e battery or the MB-D10 grip such that the other battery is used only when the primary battery is dead.

The D300 can shoot 8 frames per second with the MB-D10 & AA/EN-EL4/EN-EL4a battery installed, otherwise the camera is limited to a 6 frames per second 'shooting' mode. The MB-D10 is also compatible with the D700 but not the D200.

=== 'D2X Mode' and firmware upgrade ===
On January 15, 2008, Nikon released three additional picture control modes for the D300 which emulate the D2X/D2XS color modes I, II and III.

On February 14, 2008, Nikon released a firmware upgrade which resolves an issue where vertical banding can occur when long exposure noise reduction is enabled for shutter speeds of 8 seconds and slower.

For several years there have been third-party firmware patches available for this and other Nikon Cameras. Some have added features while others have attempted to correct defects in the original firmware.

=== Replacement cameras ===
Although the D7000 was released in 2011 D300S production continued in parallel until the release of the D500 in 2016. In February Nikon announced that the D7100 would replace the D300s as their flagship DX format camera; this would later be replaced in 2016 by the D500. The D7100 features the same Multi-CAM D3500 DX module as the D300s. However, the controls of the D7000 series departed from the standard of the D200, D300, D700, and D800 cameras. The D500 returns to that format.

== Notes ==
Sensor	Class	'99	'00	'01	'02	'03	'04	'05	'06	'07	'08	'09	'10	'11	'12	'13	'14	'15	'16	'17	'18	'19	'20	'21	'22	'23	'24	'25	'26
FX (Full-frame)	Flagship											D3X ^{−P}																	
FX (Full-frame)	Flagship										D3 ^{−P}		D3S ^{−P}		D4		D4S		D5^{T}					D6^{T}					
FX (Full-frame)	Professional											D700 ^{−P}			D800/D800E			D810/D810A			D850 ^{AT}								
FX (Full-frame)	Enthusiast																Df												
FX (Full-frame)	Enthusiast																	D750 ^{A}					D780 ^{AT}						
FX (Full-frame)	Enthusiast															D600	D610												
DX (APS-C)	Flagship		D1^{−E}	D1X^{−E}				D2X^{−E}		D2Xs^{−E}																			
DX (APS-C)	Flagship		D1^{−E}	D1H ^{−E}			D2H^{−E}	D2Hs^{−E}																					
DX (APS-C)	Professional				D100^{−E}				D200^{−E}		D300^{−P}		D300S^{−P}						D500 ^{AT}										
DX (APS-C)	Enthusiast						D70^{−E}		D70s^{−E}	D80^{−E}		D90^{−E}		D7000 ^{−P}			D7100	D7200			D7500 ^{AT}								
DX (APS-C)	Upper-entry								D50^{−E}	D40X^{−E*}	D60^{−E*}		D5000^{A−P*}		D5100^{A−P*}	D5200^{A−P*}	D5300^{A*}	D5500^{AT*}		D5600 ^{AT*}									
DX (APS-C)	Entry-level									D40^{−E*}			D3000^{−E*}	D3100^{−P*}		D3200^{−P*}	D3300^{*}			D3400^{*}		D3500^{*}							
Early models		SVC (prototype; 1986); QV-1000C (1988); NASA F4 (1991); E2/E2S (1995); E2N/E2NS (1996); E3/E3S (1998)																											
Sensor	Class																												
Sensor	Class	'99	'00	'01	'02	'03	'04	'05	'06	'07	'08	'09	'10	'11	'12	'13	'14	'15	'16	'17	'18	'19	'20	'21	'22	'23	'24	'25	'26
