= Nikon D300S =

2009 DX-format digital single-lens reflex camera

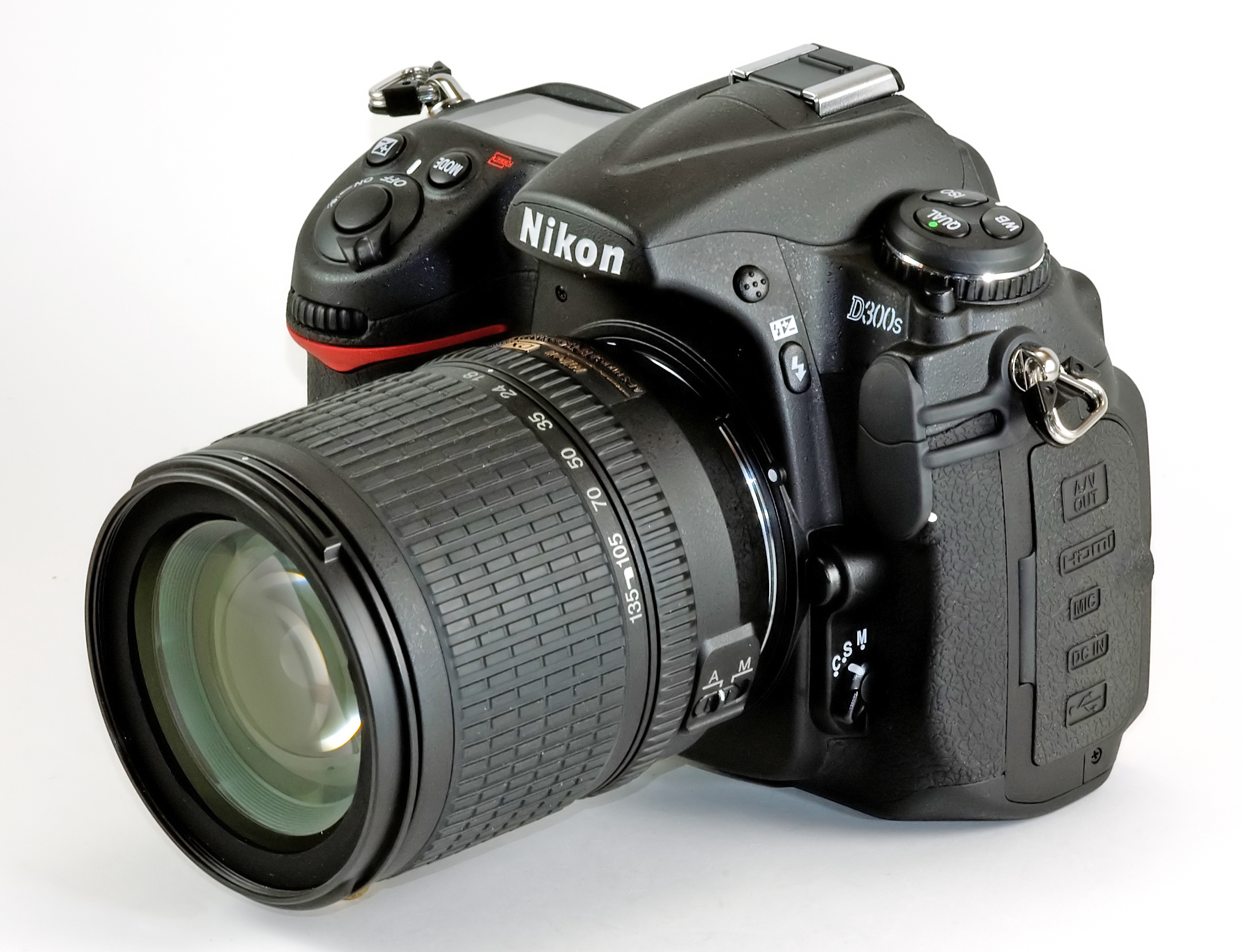

Overview
- Maker: Nikon
- Type: Digital single-lens reflex

Lens
- Lens: Interchangeable, Nikon F-mount

Sensor/medium
- Sensor: 23.6 mm × 15.8 mm Nikon DX format RGB CMOS sensor, 1.5 × FOV crop, 5.50µm pixel size
- Maximum resolution: 4288 × 2848 pixels (12.3 megapixels)
- Film speed: 200–3200 in 1, 1/2 or 1/3 EV steps (down to 100 and up to 6400 as expansion)
- Storage media: CompactFlash (Type I) and Secure Digital, SDHC compatible

Focusing
- Focus modes: Instant single-servo (AF-S); continuous-servo (AF-C); auto AF-S/AF-C selection (AF-A); manual (M)
- Focus areas: 51-area AF system, Multi-CAM 3500DX AF Sensor Module

Exposure/metering
- Exposure modes: Programmed auto with flexible program (P), shutter-priority auto (S), aperture-priority auto (A), manual (M).
- Exposure metering: TTL 3D Color Matrix Metering II metering with a 1005-pixel RGB sensor
- Metering modes: 3D Color Matrix Metering II, Center-weighted and Spot

Flash
- Flash: Built in Pop-up, Guide number 13m at ISO 100, Standard ISO hotshoe, Compatible with the Nikon Creative Lighting System
- Flash bracketing: 2 or 3 frames in steps of 1/3, 1/2, 2/3, 1 or 2 EV

Shutter
- Shutter: Electronically-controlled vertical-travel focal-plane shutter
- Shutter speed range: 30 s to 1/8000 s in 1/2 or 1/3 stops and Bulb, 1/250 s X-sync, 1/320 s X-sync with Nikon SB-600/800/900.
- Continuous shooting: 7 frame/s (8 frame/s with optional MB-D10 battery grip).

Viewfinder
- Viewfinder: Optical 0.94x, 100% Pentaprism

Image processing
- White balance: Auto, Incandescent, Fluorescent, Sunlight, Flash, Cloudy, Shade, Kelvin temperature, Preset

General
- LCD screen: 3.0-inch 920,000 pixel (VGA × 3 colors) TFT-LCD
- Battery: EN-EL3e (7.4 V, 1500 mAh) Rechargeable Lithium-Ion
- Weight: Approx. 840 g (1.85 lb) without battery, memory card or body cap
- Made in: Thailand

Chronology
- Predecessor: Nikon D300
- Successor: Nikon D500

The Nikon D300S is a 12.3-megapixel DX format digital single-lens reflex camera (DSLR) announced by Nikon on 30 July 2009. It replaced the D300 as Nikon's flagship DX format DSLR adding HD video recording (with autofocus). It has some similarities to the Nikon D700, with the same resolution, but has a smaller, higher-density sensor. The D300s was superseded by the Nikon D500, announced on January 5, 2016.

== Features ==
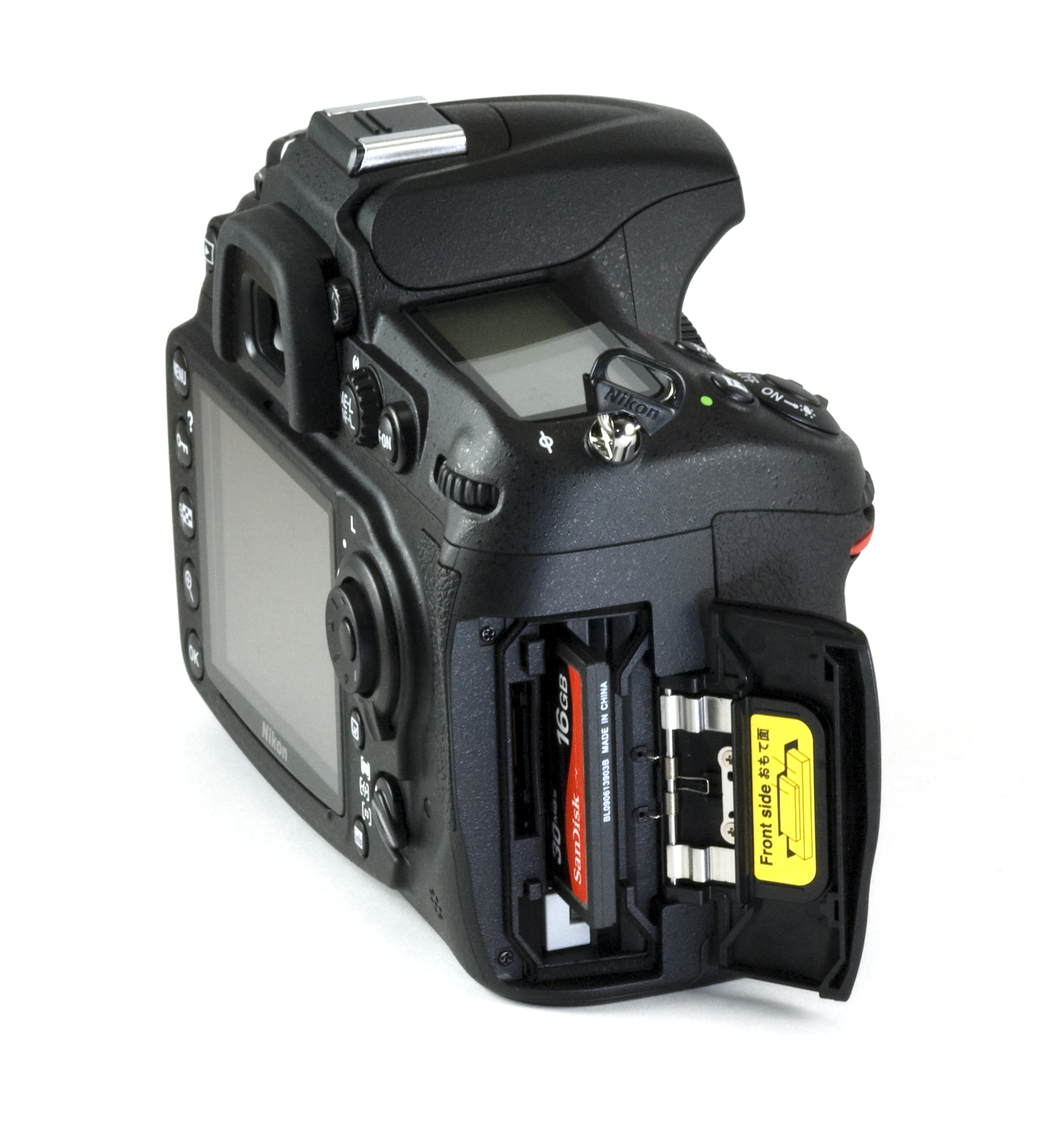

- Nikon's 12.3 megapixel Nikon DX format CMOS sensor.
- Nikon EXPEED image/video processor with 12- or 14-bit processing.
- D-Movie mode 720p, 24 frame/s, AVI, with contrast autofocus and ability to use smaller apertures.
- 16 bit/44.1 kHz stereo sound and external stereo input. Optional manual sound level control.
- In-camera movie editing
- Active D-Lighting with bracketing and Auto / Extra High Active options.
- Automatic correction of lateral chromatic aberration for JPEGs. Correction-data is additionally stored in RAW-files and used by Nikon Capture NX, View NX and some other RAW tools.
- Expanded Retouch menu
- Shutter unit tested to 150,000 cycles.
- Quiet shutter mode.
- Live view mode with dedicated Live View button
- 3.0-inch 920,000-dot resolution VGA TFT LCD
- Dual slots for CompactFlash (Type I) and Secure Digital, SDHC compatible memory cards. Backup, overflow and RAW/JPEG separate mode.
- Continuous Drive up to 7 frames per second and 8 frames per second with optional MB-D10 battery grip.
  - The rated maximum speed is available when recording JPEGs or 12-bit RAW files. However, when recording 14-bit RAW files, the maximum speed is only 2.5 fps.
- Faster startup, shutter release and autofocus time
- 3D Color Matrix Metering II with Scene Recognition System.
- 3D Tracking Multi-CAM 3500DX autofocus sensor module with 51 AF points.
- Nikon F-mount lenses.
- i-TTL flash exposure system with built-in wireless CLS (Nikon Creative Lighting System) control.

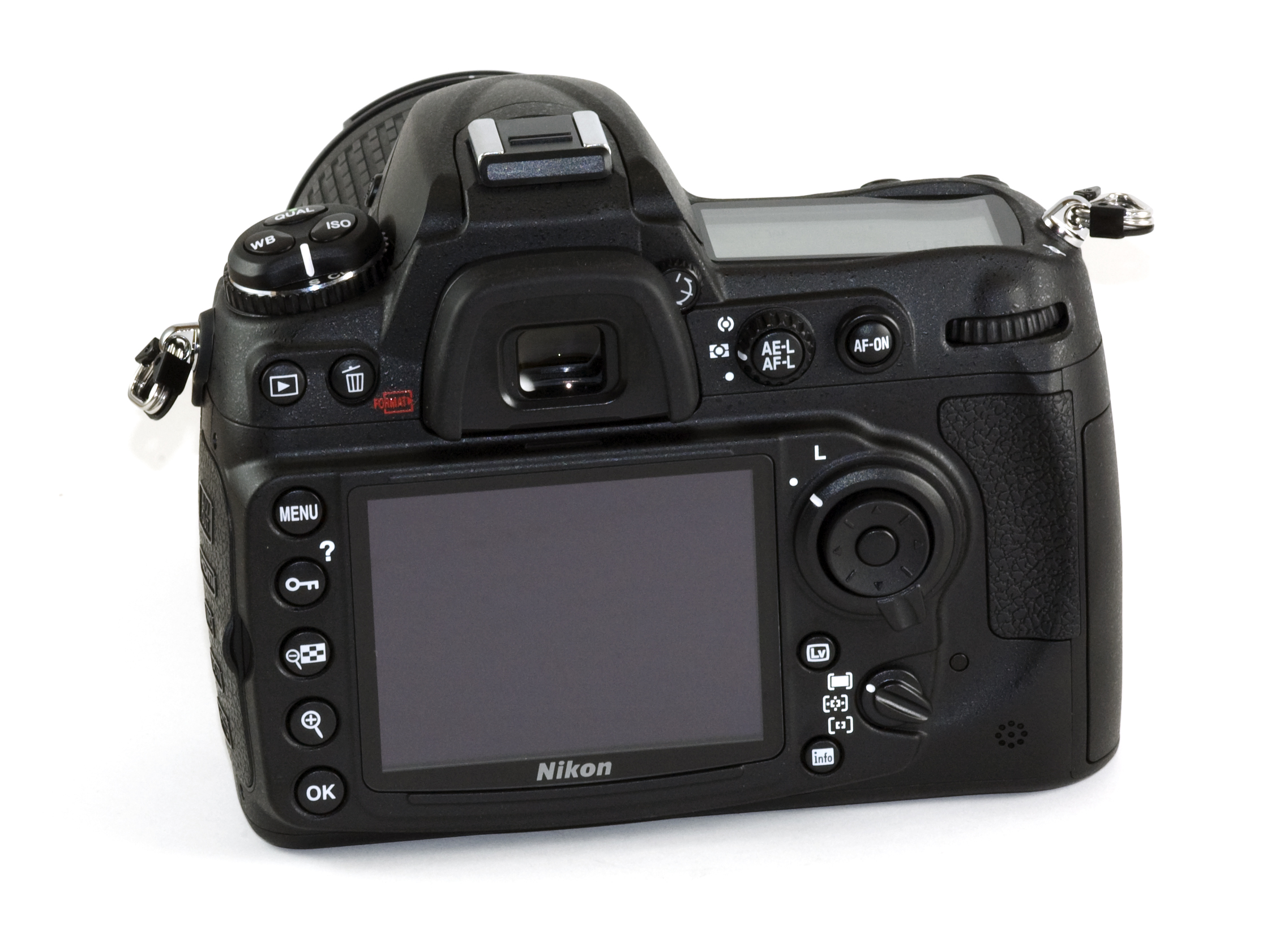

- Virtual horizon.
- File formats: JPEG, TIFF, NEF (Nikon's RAW, 12- or 14-bit compressed or lossless compressed), AVI (Motion JPEG).
- Up to 950 (CIPA) shots on a single EN-EL3e (7.4 V, 1500 mAh) rechargeable lithium-ion battery.
- Built-in flash covers 16 mm
- Dedicated center Direction pad button.
- Dedicated Info button.
- GPS interface for direct geotagging supported by Nikon GP-1

== Reception ==
The Nikon D300S has been tested by a number of independent reviewers, receiving generally favorable reviews. Digital Photography Review concluded in its extensive review: "The D300S is not the standout product that its predecessor was and unless you find your clients are clamoring for video footage, we can't see much need for existing owners to upgrade. But that shouldn't take away from an absolutely excellent product – a gently polished and refined update of a product that we considered a benchmark when it was released."

ePHOTOzine.com said that there was "a lot of scoffing at the release of this camera simply due to its only visible upgrade which is the inclusion of video. But it doesn't look like Nikon have been sitting back on their laurels at all and I think this is a worthy camera to add to the stable."

| Sensor | Class | 1999 | 2000 | 2001 | 2002 | 2003 | 2004 | 2005 | 2006 | 2007 | 2008 | 2009 | 2010 | 2011 | 2012 | 2013 | 2014 | 2015 | 2016 | 2017 | 2018 | 2019 | 2020 | 2021 | 2022 | 2023 | 2024 | 2025 | 2026 |
|---|---|---|---|---|---|---|---|---|---|---|---|---|---|---|---|---|---|---|---|---|---|---|---|---|---|---|---|---|---|
| FX (Full-frame) | Flagship | | | | | | | | | | | D3X ^{−P} | | | | | | | | | | | | | | | | | |
| FX (Full-frame) | Flagship | | | | | | | | | | D3 ^{−P} | | D3S ^{−P} | | D4 | | D4S | | D5^{T} | | | | | D6^{T} | | | | | |
| FX (Full-frame) | Professional | | | | | | | | | | | D700 ^{−P} | | | D800/D800E | | | D810/D810A | | | D850 ^{AT} | | | | | | | | |
| FX (Full-frame) | Enthusiast | | | | | | | | | | | | | | | | Df | | | | | | | | | | | | |
| FX (Full-frame) | Enthusiast | | | | | | | | | | | | | | | | | D750 ^{A} | | | | | D780 ^{AT} | | | | | | |
| FX (Full-frame) | Enthusiast | | | | | | | | | | | | | | | D600 | D610 | | | | | | | | | | | | |
| DX (APS-C) | Flagship | | D1^{−E} | D1X^{−E} | | | | D2X^{−E} | | D2Xs^{−E} | | | | | | | | | | | | | | | | | | | |
| DX (APS-C) | Flagship | | D1^{−E} | D1H ^{−E} | | | D2H^{−E} | D2Hs^{−E} | | | | | | | | | | | | | | | | | | | | | |
| DX (APS-C) | Professional | | | | D100^{−E} | | | | D200^{−E} | | D300^{−P} | | D300S^{−P} | | | | | | D500 ^{AT} | | | | | | | | | | |
| DX (APS-C) | Enthusiast | | | | | | D70^{−E} | | D70s^{−E} | D80^{−E} | | D90^{−E} | | D7000 ^{−P} | | | D7100 | D7200 | | | D7500 ^{AT} | | | | | | | | |
| DX (APS-C) | Upper-entry | | | | | | | | D50^{−E} | D40X^{−E*} | D60^{−E*} | | D5000^{A−P*} | | D5100^{A−P*} | D5200^{A−P*} | D5300^{A*} | D5500^{AT*} | | D5600 ^{AT*} | | | | | | | | | |
| DX (APS-C) | Entry-level | | | | | | | | | D40^{−E*} | | | D3000^{−E*} | D3100^{−P*} | | D3200^{−P*} | D3300^{*} | | | D3400^{*} | | D3500^{*} | | | | | | | |
| Early models | | SVC (prototype; 1986); QV-1000C (1988); NASA F4 (1991); E2/E2S (1995); E2N/E2NS (1996); E3/E3S (1998) | | | | | | | | | | | | | | | | | | | | | | | | | | | |
| Sensor | Class | | | | | | | | | | | | | | | | | | | | | | | | | | | | |
| Sensor | Class | 1999 | 2000 | 2001 | 2002 | 2003 | 2004 | 2005 | 2006 | 2007 | 2008 | 2009 | 2010 | 2011 | 2012 | 2013 | 2014 | 2015 | 2016 | 2017 | 2018 | 2019 | 2020 | 2021 | 2022 | 2023 | 2024 | 2025 | 2026 |
