= Nikon D700 =

Digital single-lens reflex camera

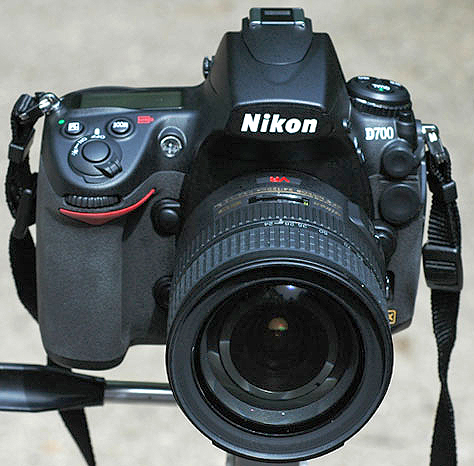

Overview
- Maker: Nikon
- Type: Single-lens reflex
- Released: 1 July 2008

Lens
- Lens: Interchangeable, Nikon F mount

Sensor/medium
- Sensor: 36 mm × 23.9 mm CMOS, 8.45 µm pixel size
- Sensor maker: Nikon
- Maximum resolution: 4,256 × 2,832 (12.1 million)
- Film speed: 200–6400, extended mode to 100–12800, HI2 mode 25600
- Storage media: CompactFlash (Type I only)

Focusing
- Focus modes: Single-servo (AF-S); Continuous-servo (AF-C); Manual (M)
- Focus areas: 51 AF points (15 cross-type)

Exposure/metering
- Exposure metering: TTL 3D Color Matrix Metering II with a 1005-pixel RGB sensor
- Metering modes: Matrix metering, center-weighted metering, spot metering

Flash
- Flash: Manual pop-up with button release Guide number 12/39 (ISO 100, m/ft)
- Flash bracketing: -3 to +1 EV in increments of 1/3 or 1/2 EV

Shutter
- Shutter: Electronically controlled focal-plane
- Shutter speed range: 1/8000 to 30 sec, bulb, X-sync at 1/250 sec.
- Continuous shooting: Approx. 5.0 frame/s, 8.0 frame/s w/battery grip

Viewfinder
- Viewfinder: Optical pentaprism, 95% coverage

General
- LCD screen: 3.0-inch (76 mm), VGA resolution, 307,200 pixels (921,600 dots)
- Battery: Nikon EN-EL3e rechargeable Lithium-Ion battery
- Dimensions: 147×123×77 mm (5.8×4.8×3.0 in)
- Weight: 995 g (35.1 oz), body only
- Made in: Japan

Chronology
- Successor: Nikon D800

The Nikon D700 is a professional-grade full-frame digital single-lens reflex camera introduced by the Nikon Corporation in July 2008 and manufactured in Japan. It uses the same 12.1-megapixel "FX" CMOS image sensor as the Nikon D3, and is Nikon's second full-frame digital SLR camera.

The D700's full-frame sensor allows the use of F-mount (FX) lenses to their fullest advantage, with almost no crop factor. When a cropped DX lens is mounted on the D700, either the DX-sized portion, or the (vignetted) FX-sized portion of the camera's sensor can be used. The D700 has a built-in autofocus motor for all Nikon autofocus-lenses, includes CPU and metering for older Nikon F-mount AI/AI-S lenses, and supports PC-E lenses. The D700 bears a physical similarity to the Nikon D300, which uses the same MB-D10 battery pack and EN-EL3e battery. It was discontinued on August 24, 2012.

== Features ==
- Nikon's 12.1 megapixel FX-format (23.9 mm × 36mm) CMOS sensor
- Nikon EXPEED image processor
- Two Live View shooting mode (hand-held and tripod modes)
- Continuous Drive up to 5 frames per second (8 frames per second with the optional MB-D10 Multi-power Battery Pack, BL-3 Battery Chamber Cover, and EN-EL4a battery from the Nikon D3 & D3S)
- Nikon's Scene Recognition System, utilizing the 1,005-pixel RGB sensor
- 3D Color Matrix Metering II
- Approx. 95% Viewfinder Frame Coverage, 0.72× Viewfinder Magnification
- Multi-CAM 3500FX autofocus sensor module featuring 51 AF points with 3D Focus Tracking
- Electronic rangefinder function compatible with manual focus AI/AIs lenses using any of the 51 AF points
- Active D-Lighting (3 levels (Low; Normal; High) or Auto)
- Automatic correction of lateral chromatic aberration for JPEGs; correction data is additionally stored in RAW-files and can be used by Nikon Capture NX, View NX and some other RAW tools
- Vignetting ("Vignette control") correction, as well as image rotation ("Straighten") via playback ("Retouch") menu
- 3-inch (76 mm) LCD with 921,600-dot (VGA) resolution and a 170° ultra-wide viewing angle
- ISO sensitivity 200–6400 (100–25600 with boost)
- Auto-ISO function which can be capped with a maximum shutter time and maximum ISO value
- Magnesium alloy weather sealed body for dust and moisture protection
- Nikon F-mount lenses
- 9 Lens presets per user profile to improve program functions for non-CPU lenses and to include Exif information
- Aperture sensing ring on the body for readout of AI/AIs manual focus lens aperture settings
- Built-in Sensor cleaning system
- Built-in flash with 24 mm lens coverage and Nikon's i-TTL flash control; the guide number is 12m at ISO 100
- Support for the Wireless Transmitter WT-4/4A
- File formats include: JPEG, TIFF (RGB), NEF (Nikon's raw image format compressed and uncompressed)
- HDMI HD video output
- Approx. mass 995 g (35.1 oz)
- EN-EL3e lithium-ion batteries (same as D80, D90, D200, D300, D300S), Battery Life (shots per charge): 1000 shots (CIPA)
- Optional Multi-Power Battery Pack MB-D10 (same as D300 & D300S)
- GPS interface for direct geotagging supported by Nikon GP-1

== Reception ==
The Nikon D700 has been tested by many independent reviewers and has generally received high marks. It achieved a top ranking in the DxOmark Sensor ranking and was, as of November 2011, ranked ninth behind the Nikon D3, Nikon D3S, Nikon D3X, four medium format cameras and the APS-C sized Pentax K-5.

The camera received several awards, including a Digital Photography Review "Highly Recommended" award.

== Legacy ==
In the years following its release, the D700 has retained its status as a capable camera, and has established itself a legend in the world of digital photography. As of 2024, many prominent photography outlets continue to praise the D700. In recent years, and unlike any other DSLR, further and updated reviews have been published, YouTube videos uploaded, with web forums, entire websites, and social media pages dedicated and updated at a regular rate, solely for and about the D700. Further affirming its continued relevance, many professionals still consider it their main camera for project or personal work, and a backup for professional engagements. The D700 is considered by many as an icon.

Sensor	Class	1999	2000	2001	2002	2003	2004	2005	2006	2007	2008	2009	2010	2011	2012	2013	2014	2015	2016	2017	2018	2019	2020	2021	2022	2023	2024	2025	2026
FX (Full-frame)	Flagship											D3X ^{−P}																	
FX (Full-frame)	Flagship										D3 ^{−P}		D3S ^{−P}		D4		D4S		D5^{T}					D6^{T}					
FX (Full-frame)	Professional											D700 ^{−P}			D800/D800E			D810/D810A			D850 ^{AT}								
FX (Full-frame)	Enthusiast																Df												
FX (Full-frame)	Enthusiast																	D750 ^{A}					D780 ^{AT}						
FX (Full-frame)	Enthusiast															D600	D610												
DX (APS-C)	Flagship		D1^{−E}	D1X^{−E}				D2X^{−E}		D2Xs^{−E}																			
DX (APS-C)	Flagship		D1^{−E}	D1H ^{−E}			D2H^{−E}	D2Hs^{−E}																					
DX (APS-C)	Professional				D100^{−E}				D200^{−E}		D300^{−P}		D300S^{−P}						D500 ^{AT}										
DX (APS-C)	Enthusiast						D70^{−E}		D70s^{−E}	D80^{−E}		D90^{−E}		D7000 ^{−P}			D7100	D7200			D7500 ^{AT}								
DX (APS-C)	Upper-entry								D50^{−E}	D40X^{−E*}	D60^{−E*}		D5000^{A−P*}		D5100^{A−P*}	D5200^{A−P*}	D5300^{A*}	D5500^{AT*}		D5600 ^{AT*}									
DX (APS-C)	Entry-level									D40^{−E*}			D3000^{−E*}	D3100^{−P*}		D3200^{−P*}	D3300^{*}			D3400^{*}		D3500^{*}							
Early models		SVC (prototype; 1986); QV-1000C (1988); NASA F4 (1991); E2/E2S (1995); E2N/E2NS (1996); E3/E3S (1998)																											
Sensor	Class																												
Sensor	Class	1999	2000	2001	2002	2003	2004	2005	2006	2007	2008	2009	2010	2011	2012	2013	2014	2015	2016	2017	2018	2019	2020	2021	2022	2023	2024	2025	2026
