= Canon EOS RT =

1989 35mm single-lens reflex camera

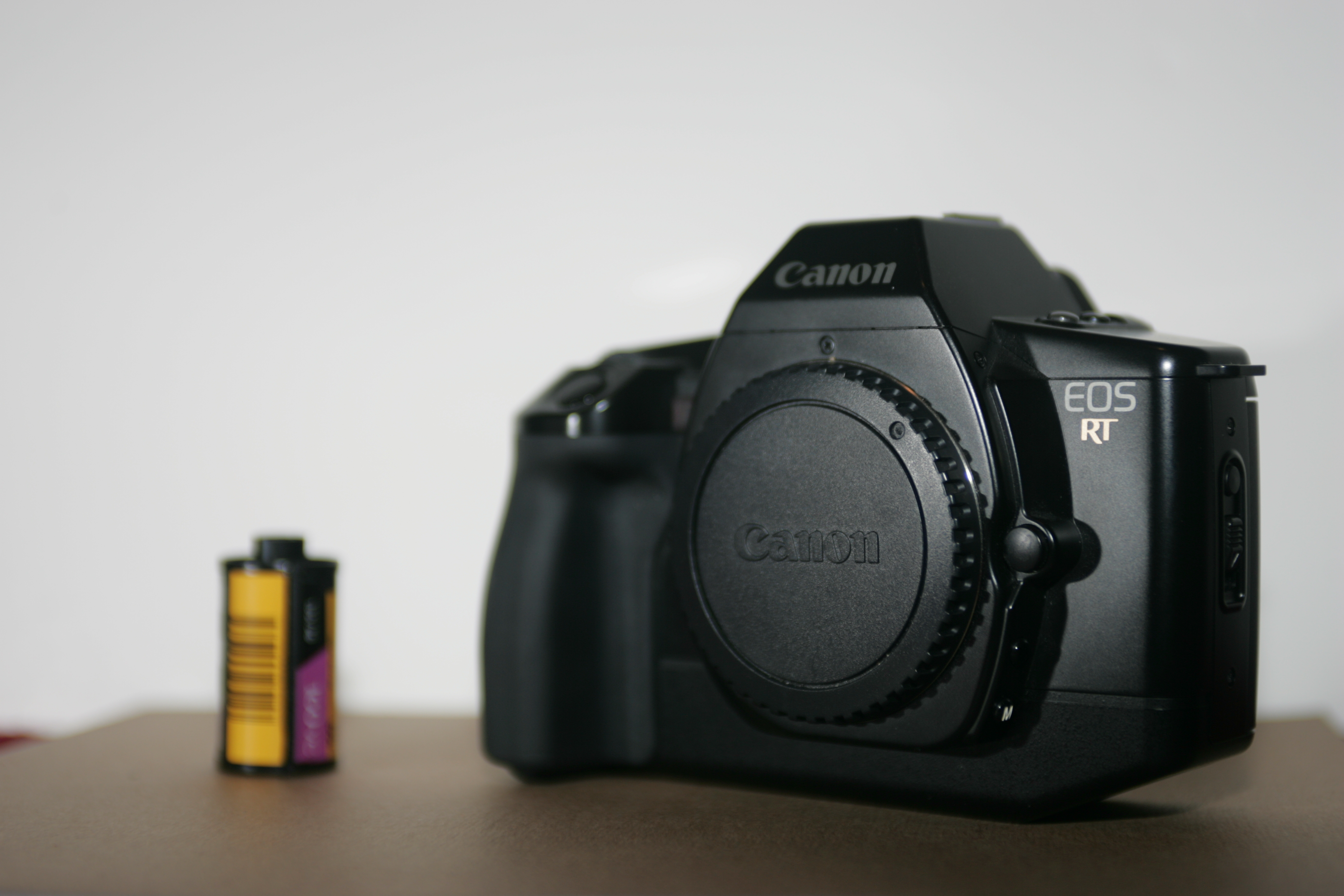
Front view

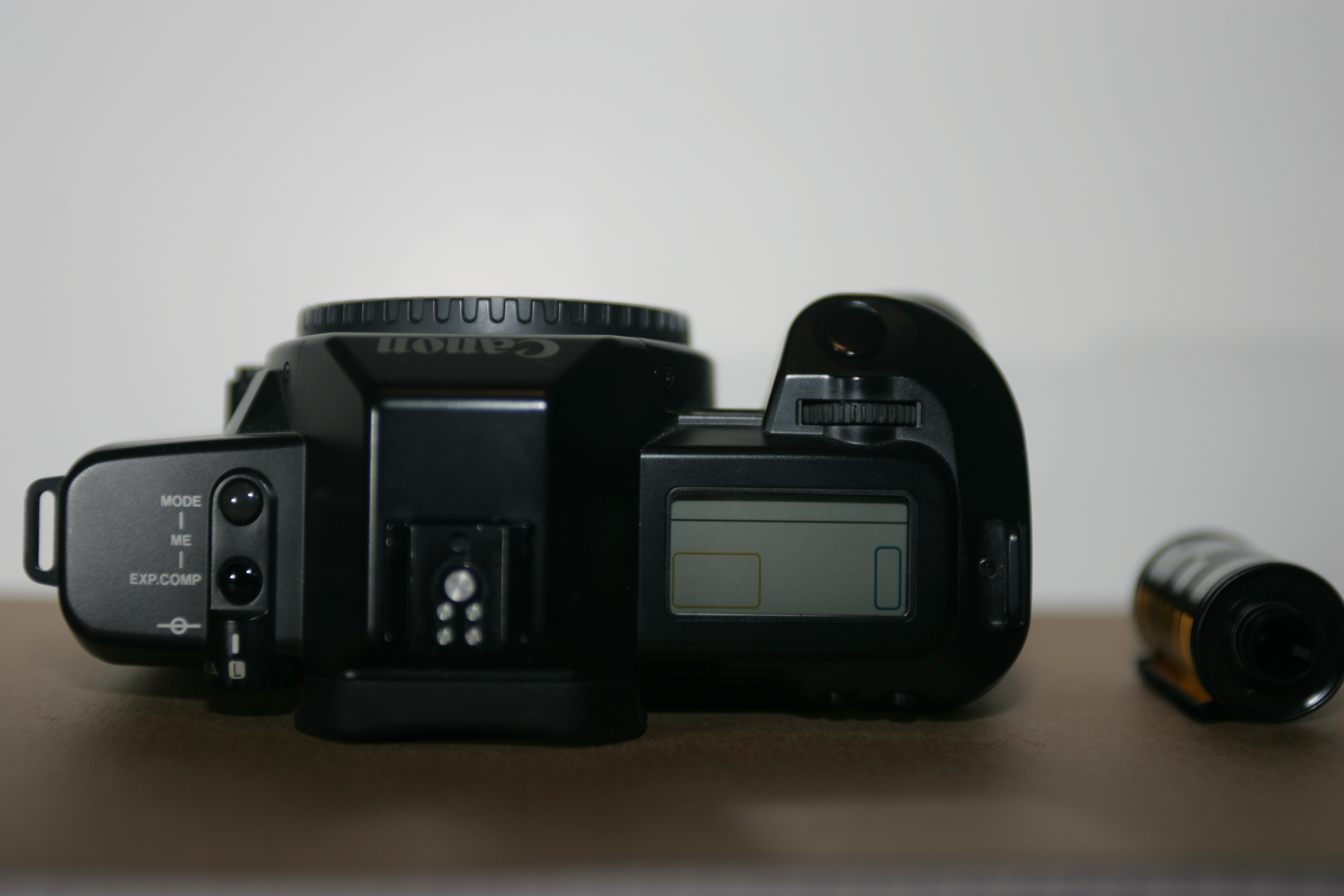
Top view

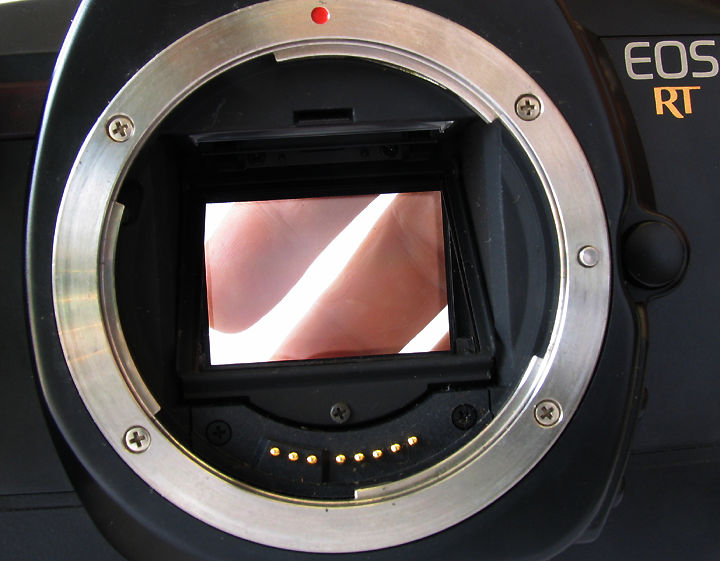
The pellicle mirror

The Canon EOS RT is a 35mm single-lens reflex camera produced by Canon and sold from 1989 to 1992. The camera is essentially an EOS 630/EOS 600 with a pellicle mirror. Only 25,000 were manufactured at the end of the EOS 630 production run, so the EOS RT was technically "out of production" before it ever went on sale.

The EOS RT was the first autofocus camera to feature a pellicle mirror, followed by the EOS 1N RS five years later. Canon had made a few manual focus pellicle mirror SLR bodies previously, including the Pellix, Pellix QL, and special limited-production cameras made for professional photographers at the 1972 and 1984 Olympic Games (the F-1 and New F-1 High Speed Motor Drive models respectively).

Pellicle mirrors offer some of the advantages of a rangefinder camera in an SLR. When taking a picture with a typical SLR camera, the mirror must flip upwards to move out of the way to allow light to pass from the lens to the film plane (or digital image sensor). Moving the mirror produces noise, introduces vibration, and causes the viewfinder to "black out". The camera also must have a slight delay between when the shutter release button is pressed, and when the shutter actually opens to allow time for the mirror to move. Quiet operation, low vibration, absence of blackout, and fast response are features usually associated with rangefinder cameras, as these cameras have no mirror reflex system between the lens and the film. In its normal operating mode, the lag time between the shutter button press and the shutter release on the EOS RT is 8 ms. Note that the camera can be set to a more conventional shutter release delay of 40 ms, same as Canon's flagship FD-mount camera, the F-1. The 8 ms delay is nearly instantaneous, the primary selling feature for the camera, and a decided boon for shooting action photography such as sports. Canon however, somewhat undid the attractiveness of the camera by using the shutter from the EOS 630/EOS 600 which had a flash synchronization speed of 1/125 second, instead of the higher speed 1/250 second speed of the shutter used on the EOS 620, the other professional EOS camera at this time.

A pellicle mirror, such as the one in the EOS RT, always reflects some of the light up to the viewfinder, and allows the rest to pass to the film plane. Therefore, the mirror does not need to move when a picture is taken. Having an uninterrupted view through the finder is especially helpful when trying to pan the camera and keep moving objects in the viewfinder, or during sports photography. Although the viewfinder does not blackout, it can however go very dim as the lens stops down to the taking aperture, so this advantage is greater at wider apertures. In the RT mode the camera will stop down prior to shutter release. This acts as a full-time depth-of-field preview, allowing the photographer to scan the scene to see what the apparent depth-of-field will be in the image at the aperture set. This enabled fine tuning of the settings prior to taking the picture.

A disadvantage of a pellicle mirror is that the light diverted to the viewfinder means less light is available to expose the film — in the case of the EOS RT, the lens effectively loses 2/3 of a t-stop. A less reflective mirror might be used, but then the viewfinder would be darker and harder to use. The advantages of a stationary mirror are less important now that modern cameras can move the mirror back and forth very quickly, reducing the shutter release lag and increasing the amount of time the viewfinder is usable. Cameras such as the Canon EOS-1D and Canon EOS-1D Mark II are able to take 8+ frames per second while moving the mirror back and forth, which is very close to the 10 frame per second rate of the pellicle mirror-equipped 1N RS. The EOS-1V with PB-E2 power booster (2000 release) and the EOS-1D Mark III are capable of sustaining 10 frames per second burst rates without the use of a pellicle mirror. Finally, the pellicle mirror also degrades lens resolution. Early tests performed by Modern Photography magazine showed that Canon film cameras with conventional mirrors produce sharper images than Canon cameras with a pellicle mirror.

Nevertheless, Sony Implemented a very similar technology on its digital interchangeable-lens DSLR-like camera line, called SLT cameras. These cameras were discounted in 2021

| Class | 1987 | 1988 | 1989 | 1990 | 1991 | 1992 | 1993 | 1994 | 1995 | 1996 | 1997 | 1998 | 1999 | 2000 | 2001 | 2002 | 2003 | 2004 | 2005 | 2006 | 2007 | … | 2018 |
| Professional | | | | 1 | | | | | 1N | | | | | 1V | | | | | | | | | |
| Professional | | | | RT | | | | | 1N RS | | | | | | | | | | | | | | |
| High-end | | | | 10 | | | 5 | | | | | | 3 | | | | | | | | | | |
| Advanced | | 620 | | 600 | | 100 | | | | 50 | | | | | 30 | | | | 30V | | | | |
| Midrange | 650 | | | | 1000F | 1000F N | | 500 | | | 500N | | | 300 | | | 300V | | 300X | | | | |
| Entry-level | | 750 | 850 | 700 | | | | | 5000 | | | | 3000 | | | 3000N | | 3000V | | | | | |
| Entry-level | | | | | | | | | | | IX | | | | | | | | | | | | |
| Entry-level | | | | | | | | | | | | IX 7 | | | | | | | | | | | |
