= Nikon D3S =

2009 full-frame digital single-lens reflex camera

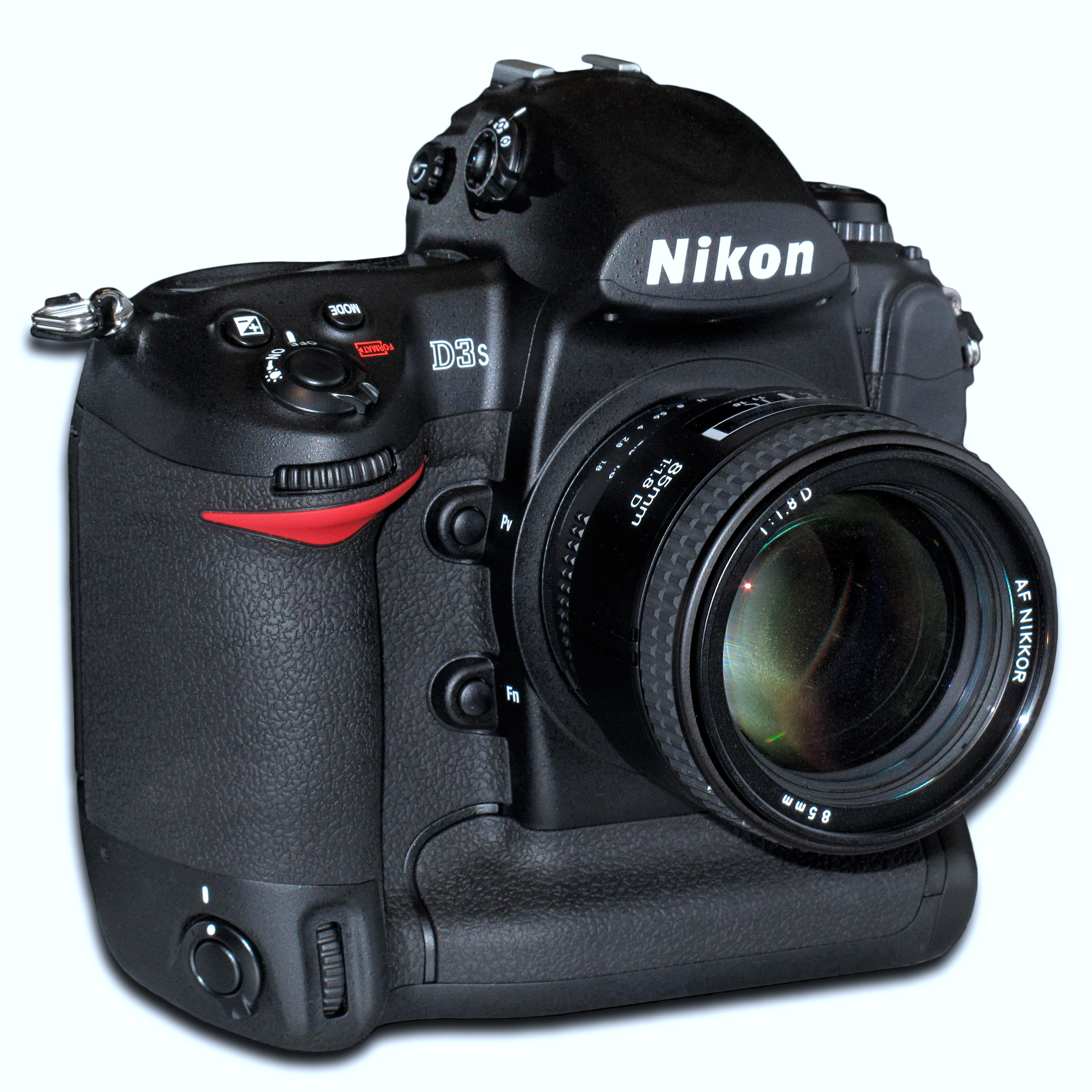

Overview
- Maker: Nikon
- Type: Digital single-lens reflex camera
- Released: 14 October 2009

Lens
- Lens mount: Nikon F
- Lens: Interchangeable

Sensor/medium
- Sensor: 36.0 mm × 23.9 mm CMOS, Nikon FX format|DX format
- Sensor maker: Nikon
- Maximum resolution: 12.1 effective megapixels (4,256 × 2,832 pixels)
- Film speed: ISO equivalency 200 to 12800 in 1/3, 1/2 or 1.0 EV steps, Boost: 100–102400 in 1/3, 1/2 or 1.0 EV steps
- Storage media: Two CompactFlash (Type I) card slots

Focusing
- Focus modes: Single-servo AF (S), Continuous-servo AF (C), Manual
- Focus areas: 51-area Nikon Multi-CAM 3500FX
- Focus bracketing: none

Exposure/metering
- Exposure modes: Programmed Auto [P], Shutter-Priority Auto [S], Aperture-Priority Auto [A], Manual [M]
- Exposure metering: TTL full aperture exposure metering system
- Metering modes: 1,005-pixel RGB 3D Color Matrix Metering II, Variable Center-Weighted, Spot AF

Flash
- Flash: n/a
- Flash bracketing: 2-9 frames in steps of 1/3, 1/2, 2/3 or 1 EV

Shutter
- Shutter: Electronically controlled vertical-travel focal-plane shutter
- Shutter speed range: 30 to 1/8000 second and bulb
- Continuous shooting: 9 frame/s (11 frame/s in DX crop mode)

Viewfinder
- Viewfinder: Optical-type fixed eye level pentaprism

Image processing
- White balance: Auto, Presets (5), Manual, and Color temperature in kelvins
- WB bracketing: 2 to 9 frames, 10,20,30 MIRED steps

General
- LCD screen: 3-inch diagonal, 307,000 pixels (920,000 dots), TFT VGA
- Battery: Li-ion EN-EL4a
- Optional battery packs: EH-6 AC Adapter
- Weight: 1,240 g (2.73 lb)
- Made in: Japan

Chronology
- Predecessor: Nikon D3
- Successor: Nikon D4

The Nikon D3S is a 12.1-megapixel professional-grade full frame (35mm) digital single-lens reflex camera (DSLR) announced by Nikon Corporation on 14 October 2009. The D3S is the fourth camera in Nikon's line to feature a full-frame sensor, following the D3, D700 and D3X. It is also Nikon's first full-frame camera to feature HD (720p/30) video recording. While it retains the same number of pixels as its predecessor, the imaging sensor has been completely redesigned. Nikon claims improved ultra-high image sensor sensitivity with up to ISO 102400, HD movie capability for extremely low-lit situations, image sensor cleaning, optimized workflow speed, improved autofocus and metering, enhanced built-in RAW processor, quiet shutter-release mode, up to 4,200 frames per battery charge and other changes compared with the D3. It was replaced by the D4 as Nikon's high speed flagship DSLR.

== Features ==
- Full-frame (36 mm × 24 mm) 12.1 megapixel sensor with ISO 200–12800 (ISO 100–102400 Boost) using reworked gapless microlenses
- 14-bit A/D conversion, 12 channel readout
- Image sensor cleaning (dust removal with 4 frequencies)
- Nine to eleven frames per second in continuous and FX/DX mode
- Quiet shutter-release mode
- Faster operation workflow
- Automatic correction of lateral chromatic aberration for JPEGs. Correction-data is additionally stored in RAW-files and used by Nikon Capture NX, View NX and some other RAW tools.
- Larger buffer for 48 RAW frames in one burst
- Enhanced built-in RAW processing with extended Retouch menu for image processing without using a computer
- 720p/24 frames HD movie mode for extremely low-lit situations, 50/60 Hz flicker reduction, HDMI HD video output and stereo input (3.5-mm diameter) with optional manual sound level control. The Motion JPEG compression allows easy extraction of single frames afterwards as JPEG
- Supports DX lenses (5.1 megapixels), viewfinder automatically masks. Newly added 1.2x crop factor
- Multi-CAM3500FX Auto-focus sensor (51-point, 15 cross-type, more vertical coverage) with improved acquisition and tracking and Auto-focus calibration for up to 20 separate lens settings
- 1005-pixel AE sensor enables Auto-focus tracking by color, highlight analysis and Scene Recognition System
- Kevlar/carbon fibre composite shutter with a rating of 300,000 actuations
- Live View with either phase detect or improved contrast detect Auto Focus
- Virtual horizon indicates in Live View mode, also available during video capture
- "Active D-Lighting" with six settings and bracketing (adjusts metering and D-Lighting curve)
- Dual Compact Flash UDMA card slots (mirror, overflow, back-up, RAW on 1/JPEG on 2, Stills on 1/Movies on 2, copy)
- Expeed 2 image processor with power management for up to 4,200 frames per battery charge
- Dual battery charger as standard
- Fully weather sealing with series of O-rings and other specialized seals available
- GPS interface for direct geotagging, supported by Nikon GP-1

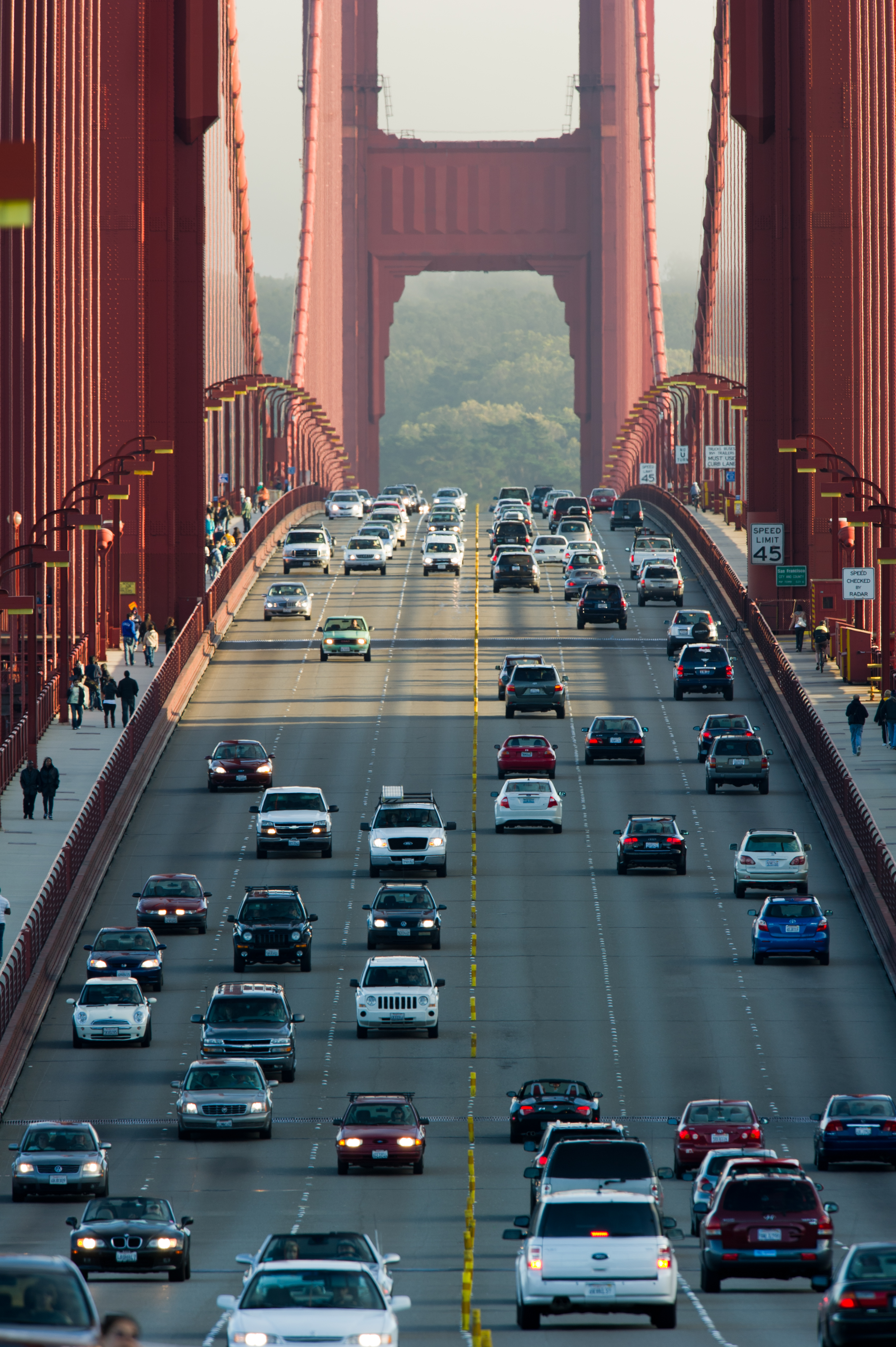
Taken With Nikon D3S

== Reception ==
Many independent reviews and comparisons show that image noise was improved up to 2 stops compared to the Nikon D3 or D700. Other functions, especially autofocus and speed, support this, causing PhotographyBlog to conclude: "hand-held photography anytime, anywhere, without flash". There are comparisons with the Canon EOS-1D Mark IV, which is rated 1.3 stops lower by DxOMark on their low-light ISO score (1320 ISO vs. 3253 ISO for the D3s).

Low-noise videos are valuated useful. While not officially documented in user's manual, D3s indeed features the full manual control in D-Movie mode, including aperture, shutter speed and ISO. This feature was reported and posted by various users and eventually confirmed officially.

On 21 December 2009, Nikon announced that NASA had purchased 11 D3s bodies and assorted lenses for use in the United States space program, including on the International Space Station. The D3s cameras are identical to the model sold to terrestrial users and will be used unmodified.

In April 2010, the D3S received a Technical Image Press Association (TIPA) 2010 Award in the category of "Best Digital SLR Professional". In August 2010, the European Imaging and Sound Association (EISA) presented the D3S with the European Professional Camera 2010-2011 award, citing high ISO sensitivity combined with low noise and a high level of detail.

Sensor	Class	'99	'00	'01	'02	'03	'04	'05	'06	'07	'08	'09	'10	'11	'12	'13	'14	'15	'16	'17	'18	'19	'20	'21	'22	'23	'24	'25	'26
FX (Full-frame)	Flagship											D3X ^{−P}																	
FX (Full-frame)	Flagship										D3 ^{−P}		D3S ^{−P}		D4		D4S		D5^{T}					D6^{T}					
FX (Full-frame)	Professional											D700 ^{−P}			D800/D800E			D810/D810A			D850 ^{AT}								
FX (Full-frame)	Enthusiast																Df												
FX (Full-frame)	Enthusiast																	D750 ^{A}					D780 ^{AT}						
FX (Full-frame)	Enthusiast															D600	D610												
DX (APS-C)	Flagship		D1^{−E}	D1X^{−E}				D2X^{−E}		D2Xs^{−E}																			
DX (APS-C)	Flagship		D1^{−E}	D1H ^{−E}			D2H^{−E}	D2Hs^{−E}																					
DX (APS-C)	Professional				D100^{−E}				D200^{−E}		D300^{−P}		D300S^{−P}						D500 ^{AT}										
DX (APS-C)	Enthusiast						D70^{−E}		D70s^{−E}	D80^{−E}		D90^{−E}		D7000 ^{−P}			D7100	D7200			D7500 ^{AT}								
DX (APS-C)	Upper-entry								D50^{−E}	D40X^{−E*}	D60^{−E*}		D5000^{A−P*}		D5100^{A−P*}	D5200^{A−P*}	D5300^{A*}	D5500^{AT*}		D5600 ^{AT*}									
DX (APS-C)	Entry-level									D40^{−E*}			D3000^{−E*}	D3100^{−P*}		D3200^{−P*}	D3300^{*}			D3400^{*}		D3500^{*}							
Early models		SVC (prototype; 1986); QV-1000C (1988); NASA F4 (1991); E2/E2S (1995); E2N/E2NS (1996); E3/E3S (1998)																											
Sensor	Class																												
Sensor	Class	'99	'00	'01	'02	'03	'04	'05	'06	'07	'08	'09	'10	'11	'12	'13	'14	'15	'16	'17	'18	'19	'20	'21	'22	'23	'24	'25	'26
