= Nikon D3X =

Digital single-lens reflex camera

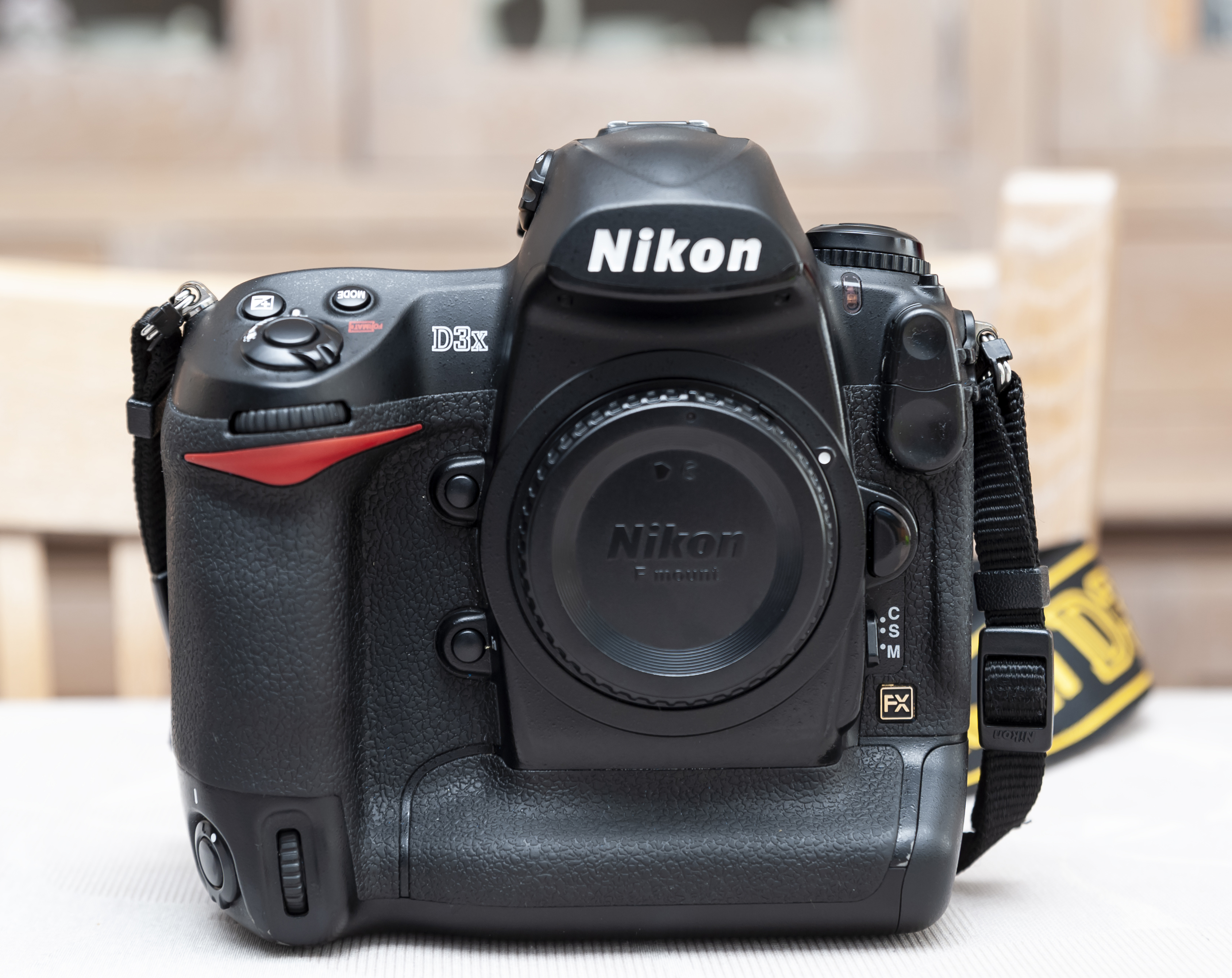

Overview
- Maker: Nikon
- Type: Digital single-lens reflex camera
- Released: 1 December 2008
- Intro price: $7,999.95

Lens
- Lens: Interchangeable, Nikon F-mount

Sensor/medium
- Sensor: 35.9 mm × 24 mm CMOS, Nikon FX format, 5.95µm pixel size
- Maximum resolution: 6048 × 4032 pixels (24.4 megapixels)
- Film speed: ISO equivalency 100 to 1600 in 1/3, 1/2 or 1.0 EV steps, Boost: 50–6400 in 1/3, 1/2 or 1.0 EV steps
- Recording medium: Two CompactFlash (Type I or Type II) & MicroDrive card slots

Focusing
- Focus modes: Single-servo AF (S), Continuous-servo AF (C), Manual
- Focus areas: 51-area Nikon Multi-CAM 3500FX
- Focus bracketing: none

Exposure/metering
- Exposure modes: Programmed Auto [P], Shutter-Priority Auto [S], Aperture-Priority Auto [A], Manual [M]
- Exposure metering: TTL full aperture exposure metering system
- Metering modes: 1,005-pixel RGB 3D Color Matrix Metering II, Variable Center-Weighted, Spot AF

Flash
- Flash: n/a
- Flash bracketing: n/a

Shutter
- Shutter: Electronically controlled vertical-travel focal-plane shutter
- Shutter speed range: 30 to 1/8000 second and bulb
- Continuous shooting: 5 frame/s (7 frame/s in DX crop mode)

Viewfinder
- Viewfinder: Optical-type fixed eye level pentaprism

Image processing
- White balance: Auto, Presets (5), Manual, and Color temperature in kelvins
- WB bracketing: 2 to 9 frames, 10,20,30 MIRED steps

General
- LCD screen: 3-inch diagonal, 307,000 pixels (920,000 dots), TFT VGA
- Battery: Li-ion EN-EL4a
- Optional battery packs: EH-6 AC Adapter
- Weight: 1,220 g (2.69 lb)
- Made in: Japan

The Nikon D3X is a 24.4-megapixel professional-grade full-frame digital single-lens reflex camera (DSLR) announced by the Nikon Corporation on 1 December 2008. The D3X is the third camera in Nikon's line to offer a full-frame sensor, following the D3 and D700. As Nikon's new flagship model at the time of its introduction, it augmented the Nikon D3S, Nikon's high-speed professional model While the D3S retained advantages in terms of high ISO performance and higher frame rate, the D3X offered a dramatic increase in resolution and image detail.

The D3S and D3X followed the earlier Nikon D1, Nikon D2H, Nikon D2Hs, Nikon D2X, Nikon D2Xs, and Nikon D3 as the company's top-of-the-line DSLRs intended for professional photographers, which in turn shared a lineage with the Nikon F through Nikon F6 series of film SLRs.

== Features ==
It otherwise offers nearly all the features of the D3S, including robust weather-sealed alloy-body construction and a built-in vertical grip. Its Nikon EXPEED image processor features automatic correction of lateral chromatic aberration, and vignetting ("vignette control") and lens distortion ("distortion"), as well as image rotation ("straighten") via playback ("retouch") menu and in camera 5:4 aspect ratio cropping.

== Reception ==
The combination of very high resolution with the option of 14-bit per channel recording and a very sharp anti-aliasing filter (which Nikon claimed to be a unique design) provides extremely high image quality, with superior dynamic range and color accuracy compared with that of other, contemporary full-frame digital cameras.

Initial reception of the Nikon D3X by independent reviewers was very positive, with reservations centered on just a few disadvantages, especially its high price. Imaging Resource concluded that the D3X produces the highest image quality of any camera they had tested. Digital Photography Review likewise concluded that the resolution and image detail is stunning, probably the best of any digital SLR camera then on the market, including the closest competitor from Canon, the EOS-1Ds Mark III. Nikon went so far as to compare the D3X's performance with that of medium-format digital backs, which was supported both by testing and by many D3X users who report on their experiences online. Consistent with the feature-set of the D2X vs. the D2H, reviewers noted that the D3X has a lower frame rate and high ISO performance than the D3S. The most obvious disadvantage of the D3X at the time of its introduction was that it listed for $8000, though the present market price could be much lower.

The Nikon D3X has been tested by many independent reviewers. Sample images with many cameras at all ISO speeds can be compared. In May 2009, the D3X won the TIPA European Photo & Imaging Award, in the "Best D-SLR Professional" category.

Sensor	Class	'01	'02	'03	'04	'05	'06	'07	'08	'09	'10	'11	'12	'13	'14	'15	'16	'17	'18	'19	'20	'21	'22	'23	'24	'25
FX (Full-frame)	Flagship									D3X ^{−P}																
FX (Full-frame)	Flagship								D3 ^{−P}		D3S ^{−P}		D4		D4S		D5^{T}					D6^{T}				
FX (Full-frame)	Professional									D700 ^{−P}			D800/D800E			D810/D810A			D850 ^{AT}							
FX (Full-frame)	Enthusiast														Df											
FX (Full-frame)	Enthusiast															D750 ^{A}					D780 ^{AT}					
FX (Full-frame)	Enthusiast													D600	D610											
DX (APS-C)	Flagship	D1X^{−E}				D2X^{−E}		D2Xs^{−E}																		
DX (APS-C)	Flagship	D1H ^{−E}			D2H^{−E}	D2Hs^{−E}																				
DX (APS-C)	Professional		D100^{−E}				D200^{−E}		D300^{−P}		D300S^{−P}						D500 ^{AT}									
DX (APS-C)	Enthusiast				D70^{−E}		D70s^{−E}	D80^{−E}		D90^{−E}		D7000 ^{−P}			D7100	D7200			D7500 ^{AT}							
DX (APS-C)	Upper-entry						D50^{−E}	D40X^{−E*}	D60^{−E*}		D5000^{A−P*}		D5100^{A−P*}	D5200^{A−P*}	D5300^{A*}	D5500^{AT*}		D5600 ^{AT*}								
DX (APS-C)	Entry-level							D40^{−E*}			D3000^{−E*}	D3100^{−P*}		D3200^{−P*}	D3300^{*}			D3400^{*}		D3500^{*}						
Early models		Nikon SVC (prototype; 1986); Nikon QV-1000C (1988); Nikon NASA F4 (1991); Nikon E2/E2S (1995); Nikon E2N/E2NS (1996); Nikon E3/E3S (1998); D1 (1999)																								
Sensor	Class																									
Sensor	Class	'01	'02	'03	'04	'05	'06	'07	'08	'09	'10	'11	'12	'13	'14	'15	'16	'17	'18	'19	'20	'21	'22	'23	'24	'25
