= Zou Jing =

Zou Jing, may refer to:

- Zou Jing (Eastern Han), Chinese military officer in the Eastern Han.
- Zou Jing (engineer), Chinese engineer, member of the Chinese Academy of Engineering.
