= Roll film =

Film roll with paper backing

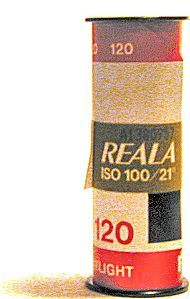
A spool of Fujifilm-brand type 120 negative roll film

Roll film or rollfilm is any type of spool-wound photographic film protected from white light exposure by a paper backing. The term originated in contrast to sheet film. Roll film was originally often referred to as "cartridge" film because of its resemblance to a shotgun cartridge.

The opaque backing paper allows roll film to be loaded in daylight. It is typically printed with frame number markings that can be viewed through a small red window at the rear of the camera. A spool of roll film is usually loaded on one side of the camera and pulled across to an identical take-up spool on the other side of the shutter as exposures are made. When the roll is fully exposed, the take-up spool is removed for processing and the empty spool on which the film was originally wound is moved to the other side, becoming the take-up spool for the next roll of film.

== History ==
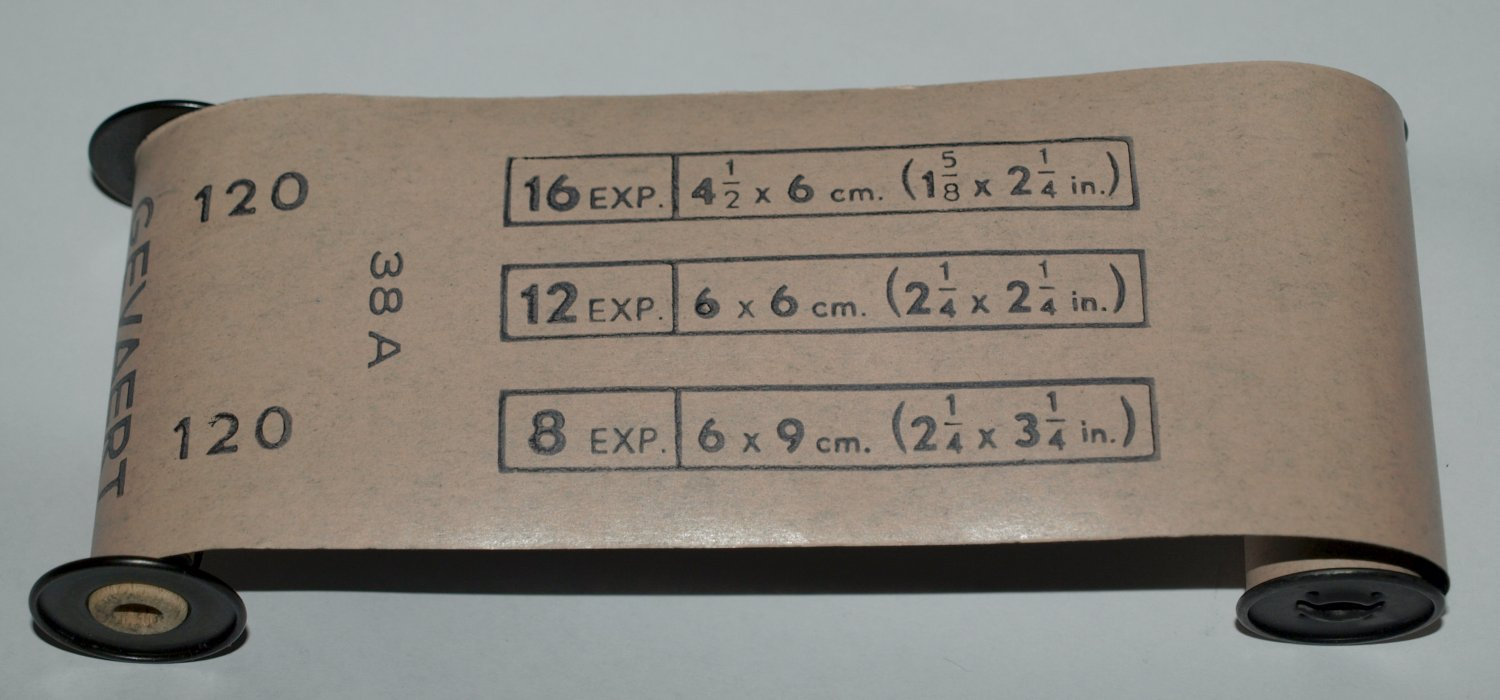
Classic 120 negative roll film, manufactured by Agfa-Gevaert, with backing paper indicating total exposures available for 4.5×6, 6×6 and 6×9 cm camera film-frame sizes

In 1881, a farmer in Cambria, Wisconsin, Peter Houston, invented the first roll film camera. His younger brother, David, filed the patents for various components of Peter's camera. David Henderson Houston (born June 14, 1841; died May 6, 1906), originally from Cambria, Wisconsin, patented the first holders for flexible roll film. Houston moved to Hunter in Dakota Territory in 1880. He was issued an 1881 patent for a roll film holder that he licensed to George Eastman and was used in Eastman's Kodak 1888 box camera. Houston sold the patent and an 1886 revision outright to Eastman for $5000 in 1889. Houston continued developing the camera, creating 21 patents for cameras or camera parts between 1881 and 1902. In 1912, his estate transferred the remainder of his patents to Eastman.

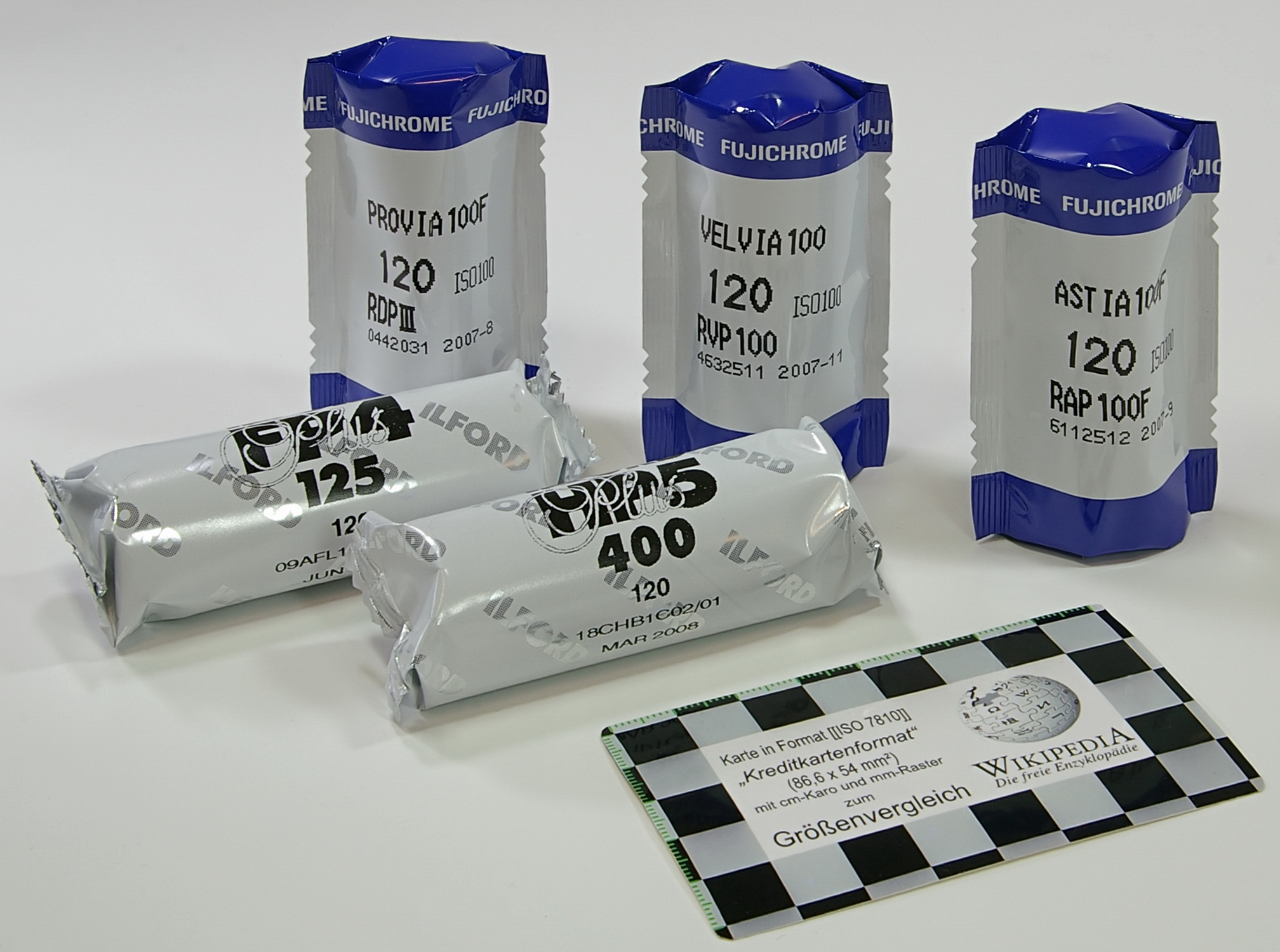
Various brands of sealed 120 negative and transparency roll films

The most popular roll film format is 120 film, which is used in most medium format cameras and roll film magazines for large-format cameras. Until the 1950s, 120 roll film was, with the smaller 127 film, also used in the simplest of box cameras and other snapshot cameras. The use of roll film in consumer cameras was largely superseded by 135 and 126 cartridges, but 120 and 220 (double length) film are still commonly used in medium format cameras.

== Automatic film speed sensing ==
In 1998, Fujifilm introduced a film identification system for 120 and 220 format roll film called Barcode System (with logo "|||B"). The barcode encoding the film format and length as well as the film speed and type is located on the sticker between the emulsion carrying film and the backing paper. This 13-bit barcode is optically scanned by newer medium format cameras like the Fujifilm GA645i Professional, GA645Wi Professional, GA645Zi Professional, GX645AF Professional, GX680III Professional and GX680IIIS Professional, the Hasselblad H1, H2, H2F and H3D Model I with HM 16-32, and the Contax 645 AF.

== See also ==
- Film stock
- Brownie (camera)
- Film format
- List of color film systems
- List of film formats
