= DX number =

Unique identifier of a film emulsion

DX I2/5 barcode on a 135 film cartridge; this is a 24-exposure roll of Fujicolor Superia Venus 400

The DX number is a number which uniquely identifies the type and manufacturer (sensitizer) of a film emulsion. These DX numbers were assigned by the International Imaging Industry Association (I3A), which published and sold a proprietary list of DX numbers for APS and 135 film yearly or as needed. The last edition of the list, entitled DX Codes for 135-Size Film, was published in January 2009.

== DX number composition ==
A DX number has two parts separated by a dash: CCC-SS

1. CCC is the "combination code", also known as "DX Number Part 1", which identifies the manufacturer and emulsion type
2. SS is the "specifier number", or "DX Number Part 2", which distinguishes between different varieties within the same family of emulsions

For example, Agfa Perutz 3-color ISO 200/24° film is assigned 115-4, while the equivalent Perutz 3-color ISO 100/21° film is assigned 115-3.

DX Part 1 numbers, from the 2008 DX Codes document:

No.	Assignee	Product(s)
0	—N/a	
1	Agfa-Gevaert	Agfapan, Scala
2	Konica Minolta	?
3	Agfa-Gevaert	Agfachrome
4	Eastman Kodak	Technical Pan
5	Agfa-Gevaert	Agfachrome
6	Eastman Kodak	Infrared (HS & Ektachrome)
7	Agfa-Gevaert	?
8	Fujifilm	Superia, Reala
9	Svema	DS-100
10	Fujifilm	Fujicolor Pro
11	Eastman Kodak	Traffic Surveillance
12	Fujifilm	Superia
13	Eastman Kodak	?
14	Eastman Kodak	?
15	Ferrania	?

No.	Assignee	Product(s)
16	Konica Minolta	Chrome
17	Agfa-Gevaert	Agfacolor
18	Ferrania	Scotch Color
19	Eastman Kodak	?
20	Eastman Kodak	Ektachrome
21	—N/a (was Tudor)	
22	—N/a (was Tudor)	
23	Eastman Kodak	Ektachrome, Elite Chrome
24	Ferrania	Imation Chrome
25	Konica Minolta	?
26	Konica Minolta	Centuria
27	—N/a	
28	Konica Minolta	VX
29	—N/a	
30	Konica Minolta	?
31	Agfa-Gevaert	Perutz Primera

No.	Assignee	Product(s)
32	Fujifilm	Sensia, Astia, Velvia, Provia
33	Fujifilm (APS)	?
34	Fujifilm	Sensia, Astia, Provia
35	Fujifilm	Superia
36	Fujifilm	NPH, Super G, Superia, Reala
37	Fujifilm (APS)	?
38	Fujifilm (APS)	?
39	Fujifilm	Superia
40	Konica Minolta	Impresa
41	—N/a	
42	Fujifilm	Fujichrome RSP
43	Eastman Kodak	MAX / Supra 800
44	Agfa-Gevaert (APS)	Agfacolor Futura
45	Agfa-Gevaert (APS)	Perutz Primera
46	Agfa-Gevaert	Agfacolor, Polaroid Plus
47	Agfa-Gevaert	Perutz Primera, Agfacolor

No.	Assignee	Product(s)
48	Konica Minolta	?
49	Agfa-Gevaert	Agfacolor Optima
50	Konica Minolta	Monochrome, Centuria, XG, LV, VX, JX
51	Agfa-Gevaert	?
52	Eastman Kodak	Ektachrome
53	Eastman Kodak	Ektachrome
54	—N/a	
55	—N/a	
56	—N/a	
57	—N/a	
58	—N/a	
59	—N/a	
60	China Lucky Film	Color Chrome
61	—N/a	
62	—N/a	
63	—N/a	

No.	Assignee	Product(s)
64	Eastman Kodak	Plus-X, Tri-X
65	—N/a (was 3M)	
66	Ferrania	?
67	Eastman Kodak	T-MAX
68	Era Photo	Era Color
69	—N/a	
70	Eastman Kodak	?
71	—N/a	
72	Konica Minolta (APS)	?
73	—N/a	
74	—N/a	
75	—N/a	
76	—N/a	
77	Konica Minolta	?
78	Eastman Kodak	B&W+, Gold, Proimage, Profoto
79	Eastman Kodak	BW400CN, Kodacolor, Portra

No.	Assignee	Product(s)
80	Eastman Kodak	?
81	Eastman Kodak	?
82	Eastman Kodak	Max, Gold, Ultima
83	Eastman Kodak	?
84	Eastman Kodak	Kodachrome
85	Ferrania	Imation Color
86	Ferrania (APS)	?
87	Ferrania	Color FG
88	Shanghai General	Shenguang, Shanghai, Seagull, Rainbow
89	—N/a	
90	China Lucky Film	B/W SHD
91	Eastman Kodak (APS)	?
92	Eastman Kodak	?
93	Eastman Kodak	Plus Digital
94	Eastman Kodak (APS)	?
95	Eastman Kodak	Professional, High Definition, Traffic

No.	Assignee	Product(s)
96	Eastman Kodak	MAX, Portra, Gold, Kodacolor
97	Eastman Kodak	B&W, Color Negative
98	Xiamen Fuda	Pan, GA
99	—N/a	
100	China Lucky Film	Color Super
101	—N/a	
102	—N/a	
103	—N/a	
104	—N/a	
105	Ilford Photo	?
106	Ilford Photo	?
107	Ilford Photo	?
108	Ilford Photo	Universal, Delta
109	Ilford Photo	Pan, Delta, HP5, FP4
110	Ilford Photo	XP1, XP2
111	—N/a	

No.	Assignee	Product(s)
112	Eastman Kodak	Portra
113	Agfa-Gevaert	Agfacolor HDC / Vista
114	—N/a	
115	Agfa-Gevaert	Perutz SC / Primera
116	Eastman Kodak	Kodachrome
117	—N/a	
118	—N/a	
119	—N/a (was ORWO)	
120	ORWO Media	Color CNS
121	ORWO Media	Color CNS
122	ORWO Media	Color CNN / OCN
123	ORWO Media	Orwopan
124	—N/a	
125	—N/a	
126	—N/a	
127	—N/a	

== Encoding ==
=== DX film canister barcode ===
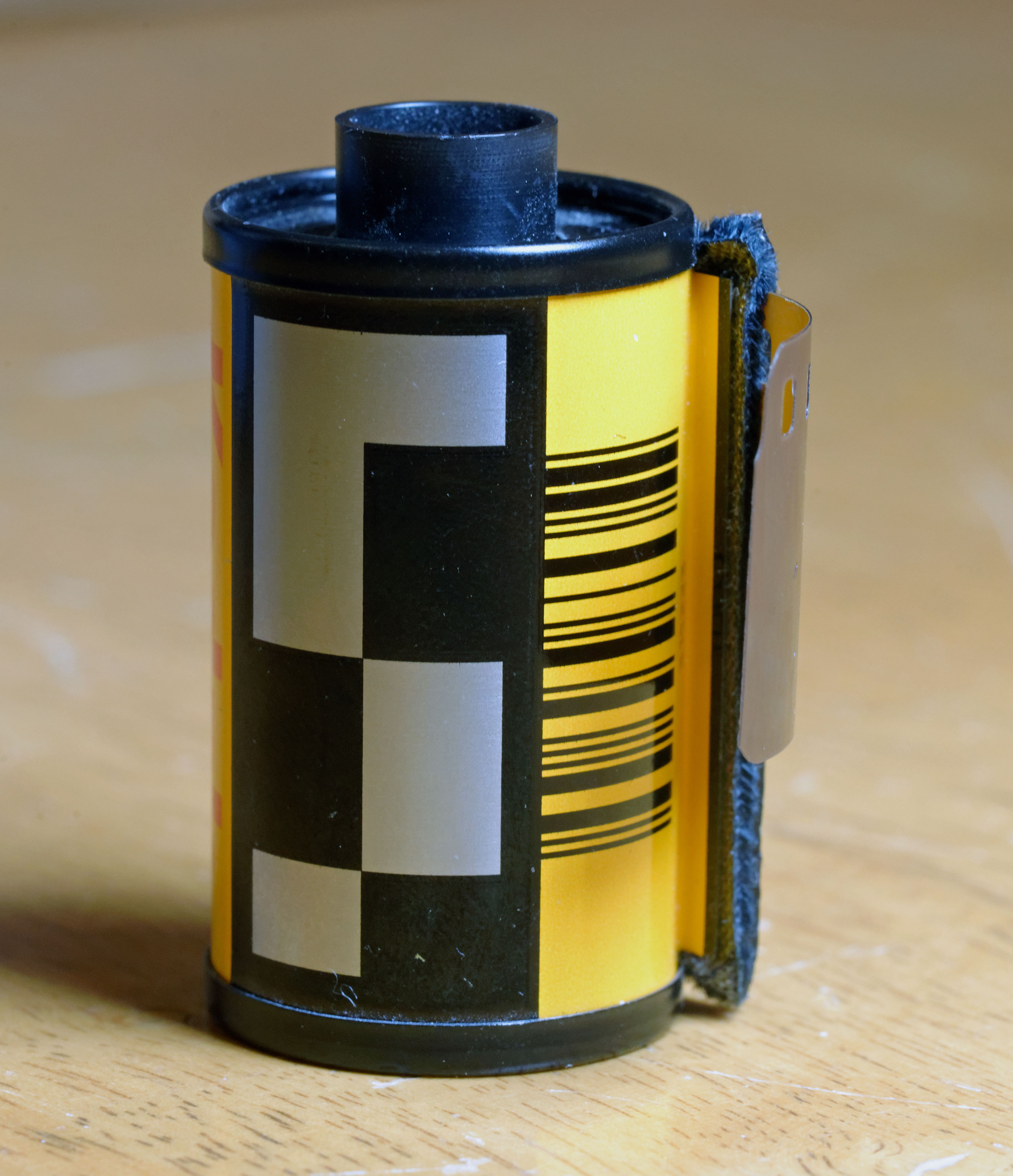
DX CAS and barcode (315223, corresponding to DX number 95-2) on this 24-exposure roll of Kodak High Definition ISO 400 color print film

The DX film canister barcode is printed in human-readable text and also represented as an Interleaved 2 of 5 barcode, located between the electrically read silver and black DX Camera Auto-Sensing Code and the film cartridge exit lip. The size and position conform to the ANSI/NAPM IT1.14:1994 standard. Some film-processing machines optically scan the barcode when the cartridge is inserted for developing.

This film canister barcode is a six-digit number in the format PHHHHE, where:

- P = proprietary prefix ranging from 0 to 9, assigned by the manufacturer
- HHHH = hashed DX number
- E = suffix identifying the number of exposures

For 135 film cartridges the DX number is hashed to produce the four-digit code HHHH. To generate this code, the combination code (a.k.a. DX Number Part 1) is multiplied by 16 and added to the specifier number (a.k.a. DX Number Part 2). The result is prefixed with zeroes, if necessary, to make four digits. For the Agfa film assigned DX number 115-4 above, the hashed 4-digit code would be 1844:

$16 \times 115+4 = 1844$

The DX number can be recovered from the hashed code by dividing by 16, which gives the Part 1 number as the largest whole integer and the Part 2 number as the remainder:

$\frac{1844}{16} = 115+\frac{4}{16}$

The suffix digit E is a code digit for the number of full-frame exposures: 1 is for 12 exposures, 2 for 20 exposures, 3 for 24, 4 for 36, 5 for 48, 6 for 60, 0 for 72 and 7 for non-standard lengths such as 24 + 3.

=== DX film edge barcode ===
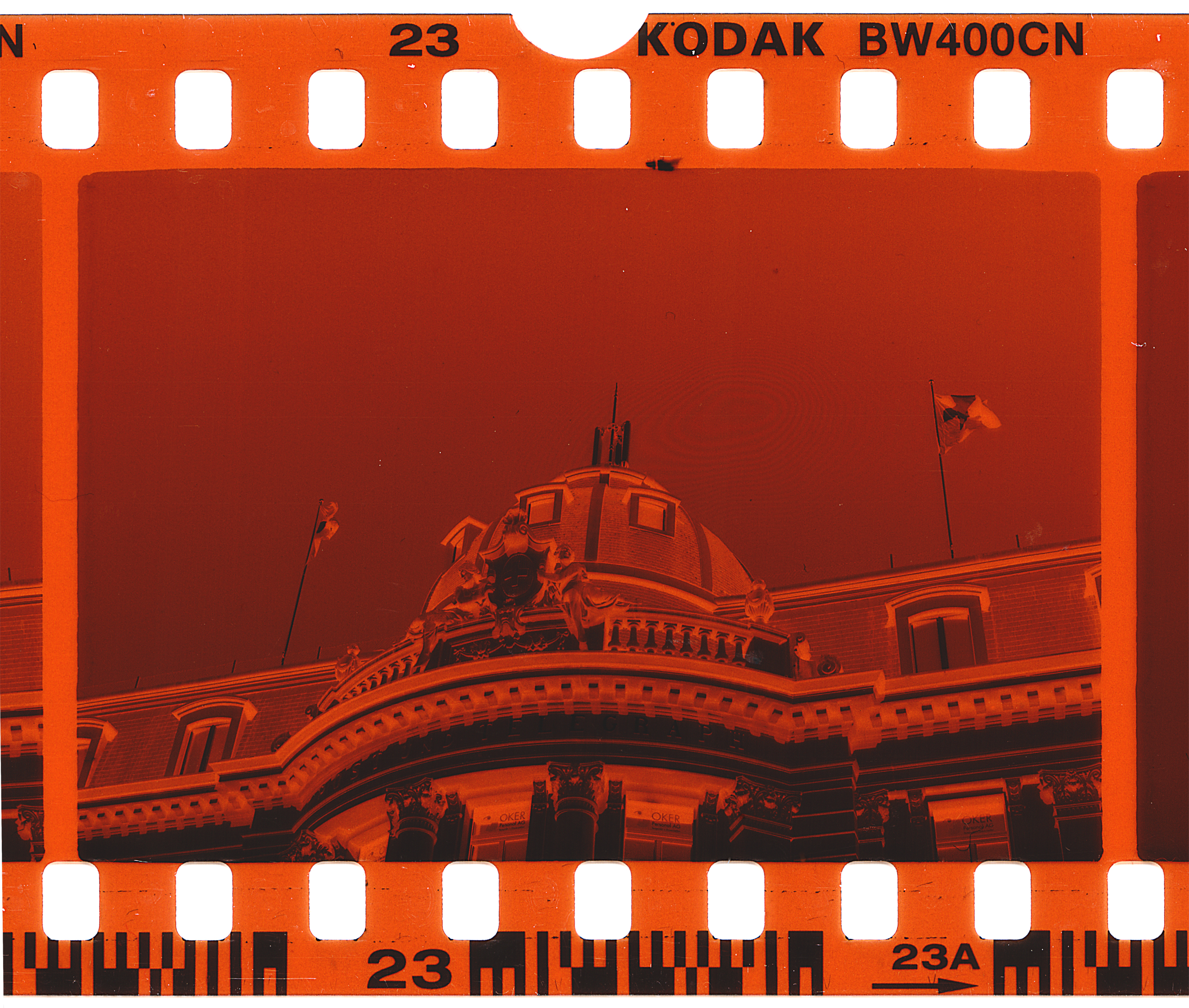
Film edge barcodes, below bottom sprocket holes; exposed Kodak BW400CN (black-and-white chromogenic) film, DX number 79-15

Most film produced since 1983 contains barcodes along the bottom edge of the film, recorded in two parallel tracks. The upper track (closer to the sprocket holes) is called the "clock track" and the lower track (along the edge of the film) is called the "data track"; the data track contains the unhashed DX number. However, unlike the film canister DX number bar code, each frame or half-frame's data track code does not provide information about the total number of frames available in the roll.

The data track consists of:

- A six-bit entry code
- A seven-bit film product class identification array (DX Number Part 1)
- One unassigned bit, left blank
- A four-bit film specifier array (DX Number Part 2)
- A six-bit frame number
- One bit to indicate if the position is a "half-frame"
- A second unassigned bit, left blank
- A parity bit
- A four-bit exit code

This information identifies manufacturers and chemistry associated with their various film types. If the manufacturer and type of film negative is unknown, the data track can be examined to identify this information. The frame number and half-frame indicator are extensions to the original data track, added by Kodak in 1990.

Sample data track code
Position:					1	2	3	4	5	6	7	8	—N/a	9	10	11	12	13	14	15	16	17	18	19	—N/a					
1	0	1	0	1	0	1	0	0	1	1	1	1	0	1	1	1	1	0	1	0	1	1	1	0	0	1	0	1	0	1
Entry code						Film product class (79 in this example)							—N/a	Film specifier (e.g., 15)				Frame no. (e.g., 23)						Half- frame	—N/a	Parity	Exit code			

For each of the three encoded numerals, the most significant digit is on the left and the least significant digit is on the right; for example, the film class is a seven-bit number encoded in positions 2 through 8; position 8 is the least significant digit, and position 2 is the most significant digit. In this example, the binary number encoded (1001111) for the film class is equal to 79 (base-10). The parity bit is set or left blank to ensure the total number of "1" bits in positions 1 through 12 plus the parity bit is even. In this example, there are nine "1" bits in positions 1 through 12, so the parity bit is set.

== See also ==
- DX encoding
