= Zou Jing (engineer) =

Chinese engineer (1936–2022)

- 邹竞
- Born: 9 February 1936; Shanghai, China
- Died: 9 June 2022 (aged 86); Tianjin, China
- Education: Saint Petersburg State Institute of Film and Television
- Scientific career
- Fields: Photosensitive materials
- Workplaces: Tianjin University; China Lucky Film; Beijing Institute of Graphic Communication

Chinese name
- Simplified Chinese: 邹竞
- Traditional Chinese: 鄒競
Transcriptions
Standard Mandarin
- Hanyu Pinyin: Zōu Jìng

Zou Jing (Chinese: 邹竞; 9 February 1936 – 9 June 2022) was a Chinese engineer specializing in photosensitive materials, and an academician of the Chinese Academy of Engineering. She was a delegate to the 8th National People's Congress and a member of the 9th National Committee of the Chinese People's Political Consultative Conference.

== Biography ==
Zou was born in Shanghai, on 9 February 1936, while her ancestral home is in Pinghu, Zhejiang. During the Second Sino-Japanese War, her family moved to Suzhou to escape from the war. She secondary studied at Suzhou High School. After studying a year of Russian language at Beijing Russian College in 1955, she was sent to study at the Saint Petersburg State Institute of Film and Television on government scholarships.

Zou returned to China in 1960 and that same year became an engineer at Baoding Film Factory (now China Lucky Film). She joined the Chinese Communist Party (CCP) in August 1987. In May 2010, she joined the faculty of School of Chemical Engineering, Tianjin University. On 15 March 2011, she was hired as director of the Printing Electronics Research Center of Beijing Institute of Graphic Communication.

On 9 June 2022, she died from an illness in Tianjin, at the age of 86.

== Contributions ==
In the 1960s, Zou successfully developed three kinds of special infrared films urgently needed by national defense and military industry, which filled the gap in China; Since the 1970s, she had presided over the development of three generations of lucky color films, which had achieved a great breakthrough in domestic color films from scratch and achieved remarkable economic and social benefits; Since the beginning of the 21st century, she had successively developed general-purpose medical green X-ray film, medical infrared laser image films, silver salt transparent conductive film, solar cell back film, and other functional film materials.

== Honours and awards ==
- 1988 State Science and Technology Progress Award (First Class)
- 1992 State Science and Technology Progress Award (Second Class)
- 1994 Member of the Chinese Academy of Engineering (CAE)
- 1996 Science and Technology Progress Award of the Ho Leung Ho Lee Foundation
