= Fuji GX680 =

Fujifilm GX680
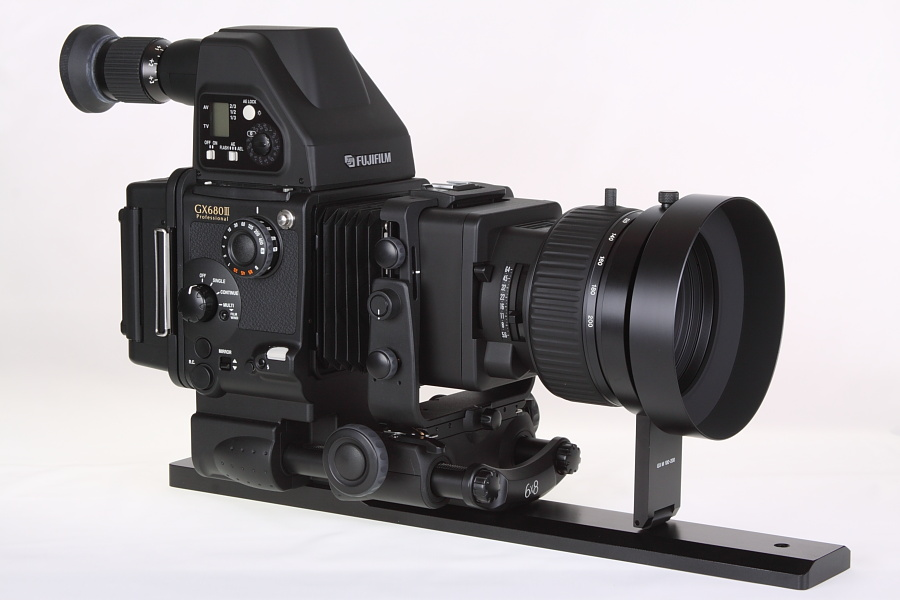
- Fuji GX680 (III pictured with 100-200mm zoom lens, support rail, and AE eye-level finder)

Overview
- Maker: Fujifilm
- Type: Interchangeable-lens SLR medium-format studio/field camera

Sensor/medium
- Sensor type: Film
- Sensor size: 56 mm × 76 mm 2.2 in × 3.0 in
- Film format: 120/220
- Film advance: Motor
- Film rewind: Motor

Focusing
- Focus: Manual

Exposure/metering
- Exposure: Manual; aperture-priority automatic

Shutter
- Shutter speed range: 1/400–8s + B

Viewfinder
- Viewfinder: waist-level
- Optional viewfinders: eye-level, autoexposure, and angle
- Frame coverage: 100%

General
- Made in: Japan

Chronology
- Successor: GX680 II, GX680 III

The Fuji GX680 is a series of single lens reflex system cameras for medium format film produced by Fujifilm with interchangeable camera lenses and interchangeable film holders for the unusual film format 6×8 cm (Note: 6×8cm are the nominal dimensions; actual image size is 56 mm × 76 mm (2.2 in × 3.0 in).) on 120 and 220 roll film. The distinguishing feature of the Fuji GX680 is the articulating front standard, which runs on a rail connecting lens and camera body by a bellows; each interchangeable lens is permanently mounted to a lens board.

In contrast to competing medium-format cameras, e.g. Mamiya RB67 and RZ67 and Rolleiflex SL66, for some models of the Fuji GX680 the front standard can be shifted right, left, up and down for perspective control, and the front standard can also be tilted on horizontal and vertical axes to control depth of field using the Scheimpflug principle. Therefore, the Fuji GX680 has many of the same camera movements of a large format view camera, only limited by restricted motions of the front standard and a fixed rear standard, making the camera also suitable for architectural photography. The Fuji GX680 has quite large physical dimensions for a medium-format camera, but compared to the typical monorail/studio large-format camera, the Fuji GX680 is more compact. Although the Fuji GX680 was designed for studio work due to its size and weight, a neck-strap was offered for mobile work.

== Camera models ==
The Fuji GX680 has been built in 3 model variants (numbers in parentheses are the production periods):

- Fuji GX680 (1987–1995)
- Fuji GX680 II (1995–1998)
- Fuji GX680 III (1998–2007)

The 3 models differ externally only by slight modifications on displays, controls and rechargeable battery versus battery. The GX680 was introduced in 1987, and shown at the Photographic Marketing Association convention with nine lenses, which was held in Chicago. The original GX680 and GX680 II are powered by a rechargeable nickel-cadmium battery, which provides sufficient power for approximately 1000 exposures and recharges in 1 hour. Alternatively, for studio use, an optional DC power supply is available. Externally, the original may be distinguished from model II by the focus locking mechanism. The focusing knob operated by the right hand has a "focus brake" lever coaxial with the focus knob on the original camera, while the same function is performed by a "focus lock lever" that is on the front standard carrier on the model II. The III/IIIS has the name prominently marked on the right side of the camera, above the shutter speed selector dial.

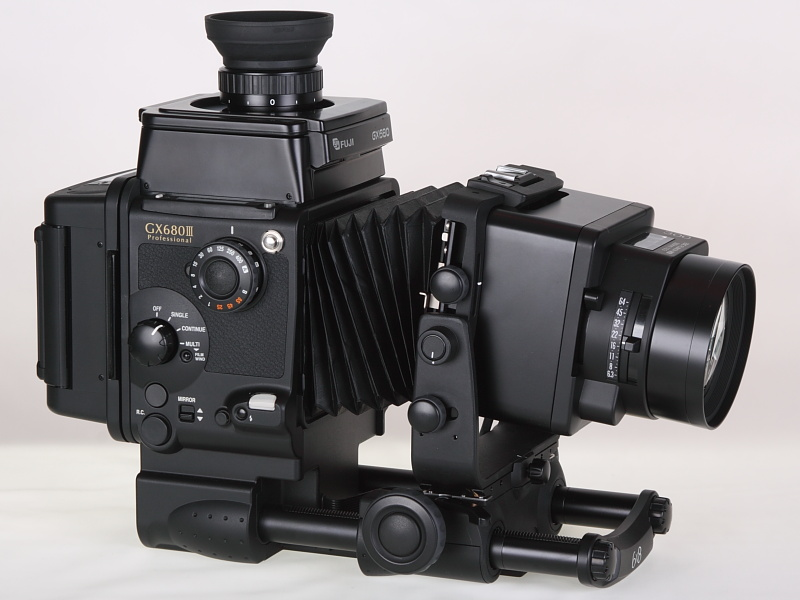
GX680 III demonstrating front standard rise and tilt movements

There is a second (Simplified) variant of the model III denoted with an "S" suffix (e.g., GX680 IIIS) which only allows linear extension of the front standard along the rails, and omits the tilt and shift movements of the standard model. In return, the IIIS is 12 oz (340 g) lighter than the regular model III.

The Fuji GX680 system features interchangeable camera lenses, viewfinders and focusing screens, film holders (also for instant film), batteries, and bellows including the standard bellows, bag bellows for wide angle lenses and extended long bellows for telephoto lenses over 150mm. Optional accessories include 50mm extension rail sets for close ups, a remote release, viewfinder correction lenses, neck strap, and bellows lens shades. Fuji produced a digital back for the GX680 but it was only available in Japan. In the US, Fuji partnered with the makers of the Luma digital back in the early 2000's.

The film holders for the GX680 and GX680 II feature a backup ER-3 lithium battery to retain data.

Comparison of key specifications
	GX680	GX680 II	GX680 III & IIIS	
Power Source	rechargeable battery (7.2V)		3× CR123A batteries (9V), optional battery holder	
Display	LEDs		LCD	
Error warnings	Yes, audible and visual			
Lenses	EBC Fujinon GX or EBC Fujinon GX M (Note: The GX M-Lenses were introduced with GX680 III. An electronic Picture-Counter was included in the lenses, allowing the Fuji GX680 III together with film-holder III to show the counter for the film-holder, the camera and the lens for maintenance purposes. GXM-Lenses can be used on models GX680 and GX680 II, but show no counter there.)			
Display Filmcounter	Counter for camera & filmholder		Counter for camera, filmholder & lens (Note: Counter for lens only with GX M-Lenses and film-holder III)	
Film advance	Yes, automatic to first frame & after last frame; motor-driven between each exposure via discrete film wind button			
Data recording	No		Yes, with film holder III	
Film	120/220 type 6 cm roll film (Note: 120 and 220 type roll-film used different film-holders on models GX680 and GX680 II; model GX680 III used different replaceable film-cassettes in the same film-holder)			
Formats	Portrait/Landscape by revolving the film holder, viewfinder mask coupled to the revolving film holder shows the actual orientation (Note: only viewable with 6x8 and 6x7 focusing screens on model GX680 III)			
Formats	6×8 cm (56×76mm)		6×8cm (56×76mm); 6×7cm (Note: needs adequate format-mask for film-holder III, adapt viewer by matching focusing screen with imprinted format border, changing of film-mask in the middle of a roll is not possible.) (56×69mm); 6×6cm (56×56mm); 6×4.5 cm (56×41.5mm)	
Lens-Shift, max. (Note: Maximum effective movement is reduced when using 50mm Lens or 100-200mm Zoom-Lens, also by combining different movements with any lens; model GX680 III S has no Lens-Shift or -Tilt)	15mm right, left, up; 13mm down			IIIS: No motions
Lens-Tilt, max.	±12° on horizontal and vertical axis			IIIS: No motions
Communications connector (Note: enables mounting of Fujifilm DBP Digital Back)	No		Yes	
Shutter Speed	1/400–8s, Bulb			
Exposure Frequency (Note: via motor-film-advance in film-holder)	ca. 1 frame/s			
ISO (Note: manual setting on film-holder or automatic setting via film bar code system)	25-1600		25-3200	
Mounting for neck-strap (Note: sidewise eyelets on body)	No, extra neck-strap-set available		Yes	
Flash	Yes, synchro-socket & test button provided on camera body; hotshoe on front standard			
Exposure-Programs	Manual (set Exposure-Time and Aperture manually), Auto Exposure AE (Aperture priority, set Aperture manually, automatic setting of Shutter Speed depending on ISO-setting on film-holder in combination with Exposuremeter in AE-Finder)			
OTF (Note: OTF is Off The Film, during the exposure a Silicon-Diode inside the camera-body measures the light reflected by the film in a central 25mm diameter circle, displays: over-/under- or correct-exposure after taking the picture; no Flash Control via OTF possible)-Exposure-Warning, -Display	Yes, displayed via LEDs		Yes, displayed via LCD	
OTF-Sensitivity	LW 4–18 at ISO 100		LW 5–19 at ISO 100	
TTL-Light- & -Flashlight-Measure	No, only via AE-Finder			
Weight	4146g (Note: Camera body with 135mm/1:5.6 lens, film holder and rechargeable battery)	4256g	III: 4070g, (Note: Camera body with 135mm/1:5.6 lens and film holder, without (rechargeable) batteries) 2690g (Note: Body only, without batteries)	IIIS: 3720g, 2350g
Dimensions	187 mm × 278 mm × 207 mm 7.4 in × 10.9 in × 8.1 in		III: 188 mm × 274 mm × 213 mm 7.4 in × 10.8 in × 8.4 in	IIIS: 188 mm × 274 mm × 187 mm 7.4 in × 10.8 in × 7.4 in

=== Parts and controls ===
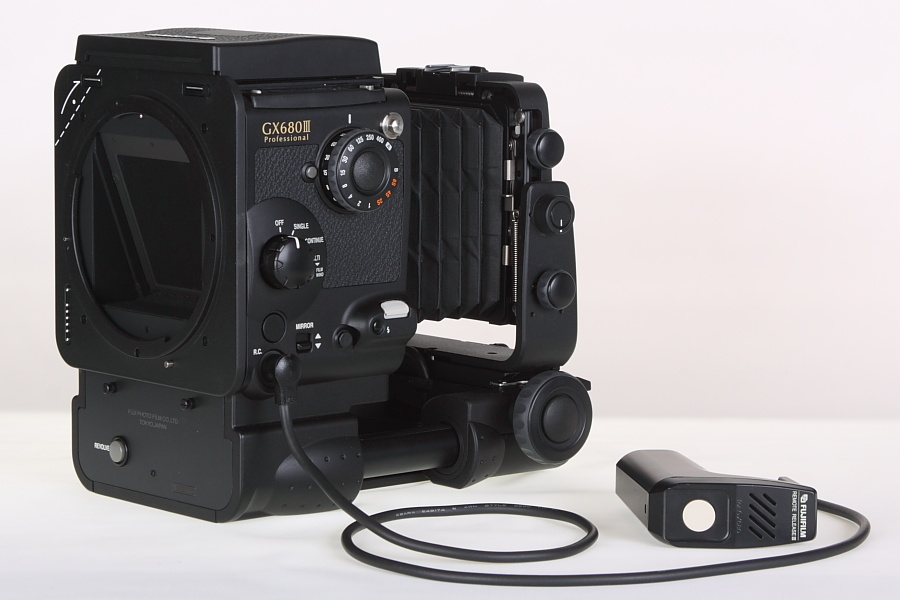
Most of the camera controls and a flash synchro socket are on the right side of the body, shown here with a 1m remote release. This is a bare body with bellows only; the revolving film holder would lock on to the prominent circular interface.

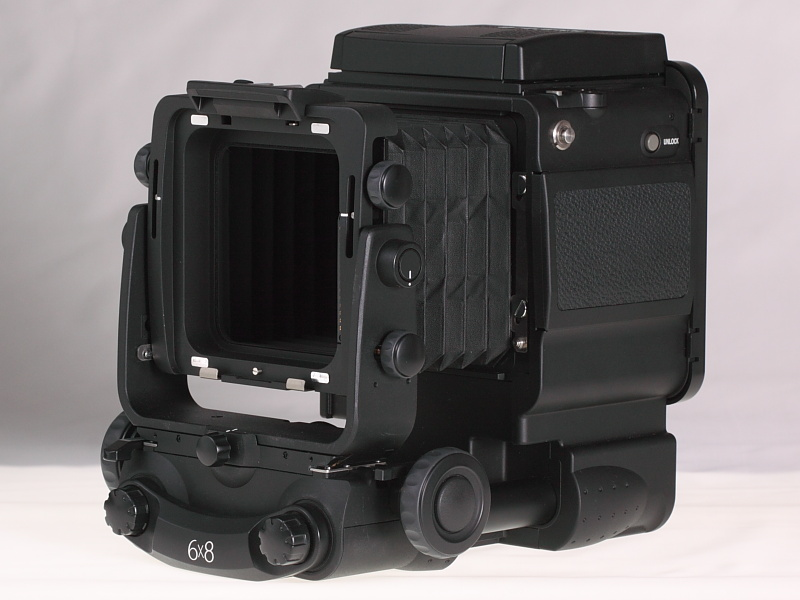
The left side of the body includes the interface for the camera battery. Again, a bare body is shown and the lens board interface can be seen in the front standard.

The listed controls and parts are available on the camera:

- Controls on the right-hand side of the camera body:
  - Shutter release button
  - Power off & film advance (Single/Continuous/Multi) mode selector
  - Film wind button (following a multi-exposure)
  - Mirror up/down switch
  - Shutter speed selector dial (including Bulb and Auto Exposure)
  - Flash synchro socket
  - Flash synchro test button
  - Remote control shutter release socket
  - Communications connector (only on model III)
- Controls on the left-hand side of the camera body:
  - Battery lock button (model I/II only)
  - Side Cover Lock Release button (model III only)
  - Battery interface (model I/II only)
  - Battery Holder III interface (model III only)
- Controls on the top of the body:
  - Spirit level
  - Viewfinder lock release lever
  - LEDs or LCD (post-exposure monitoring)
- Controls on the bottom of the body:
  - Battery compartment (model III only)
- Controls on the back of the body:
  - Revolving film-holder lock release button
- Controls on the lens:
  - Aperture selector lever
  - Aperture stop-down (depth-of-field preview) lever
- Controls on the front standard:
  - Focusing knobs and Focus lock lever
  - Tilt, Shift, and Swing knobs and locks
  - Hot shoe (on front standard)
  - Lens lock lever

== Lenses ==
All EBC Fujinon GX(M) Lenses have been equipped with a Central shutter (Flash synchronisation is possible at all shutter-speeds), the lenses have good reputations. Electric contacts on the lens board and the lenses are used to control the central shutter from the camera body. The shutter in all lenses is electronic and made by Seiko. Levers on the lens control the aperture.

Fujinon GX(M) lenses for GX680 cameras
EBC Fujinon Lens	35mm-equiv. FL & aperture	Aperture range	Filter (mm)	Mass	Dimensions (mm)	Elements/ groups	MSRP (×1000 ¥)	Notes
Wide-angle lenses
50mm f/5.6 GX (M)	23mm f/2.6	f/5.6–45	112	1,250 g (2.76 lb)	115×115×125 mm (4.5×4.5×4.9 in)	12/9	267	cannot be used with full movements due to smaller image circle
65mm f/5.6 GX (M)	30mm f/2.6	f/5.6–45	95	1,190 g (2.62 lb)	107×107×116 mm (4.2×4.2×4.6 in)	10/9	225	
80mm f/5.6 GX (M)	37mm f/2.6	f/5.6–45	95	1,100 g (2.4 lb)	101×107×113 mm (4.0×4.2×4.4 in)	8/8	190	
Normal lenses
100mm f/4.0 GX (M)	46mm f/1.8	f/4–45	82	910 g (32 oz)	101×107×101 mm (4.0×4.2×4.0 in)	8/8	147	
115mm f/3.2 GX MD	53mm f/1.5	f/3.2–32	95	870 g (31 oz)	101×107×95 mm (4.0×4.2×3.7 in)	8/6	183	
125mm f/3.2 GX MD	57mm f/1.5	f/3.2–32	95	895 g (31.6 oz)	101×107×96 mm (4.0×4.2×3.8 in)	8/6	178	
125mm f/5.6 GX (M)	57mm f/2.6	f/5.6–45	82	545 g (19.2 oz)	101×107×80 mm (4.0×4.2×3.1 in)	6/5	142	
135mm f/5.6 GX (M)	62mm f/2.6	f/5.6–45	82	565 g (19.9 oz)	101×107×79 mm (4.0×4.2×3.1 in)	6/6	122	the most common "kit lens" for this system
150mm f/4.5 GX (M)	69mm f/2.1	f/4.5–45	82	705 g (24.9 oz)	101×107×91 mm (4.0×4.2×3.6 in)	6/4	153	
Portrait lenses
180mm f/3.2 GX MD	82mm f/1.5	f/3.2–32	95	1,030 g (2.27 lb)	101×107×105 mm (4.0×4.2×4.1 in)	7/5	160	
180mm f/5.6 GX (M)	82mm f/2.6	f/5.6–45	82	800 g (28 oz)	101×107×104 mm (4.0×4.2×4.1 in)	6/6	195	
190mm f/8.0 GX SF	87mm f/3.7	f/8–64	82	690 g (24 oz)	101×107×104 mm (4.0×4.2×4.1 in)	3/3	156	unique aperture design for soft focus effect
210mm f/5.6 GX (M)	96mm f/2.6	f/5.6–64	82	835 g (29.5 oz)	101×107×103 mm (4.0×4.2×4.1 in)	5/5	160	
250mm f/5.6 GX (M)	115mm f/2.6	f/5.6–64	82	925 g (32.6 oz)	101×107×105 mm (4.0×4.2×4.1 in)	5/4	164	
300mm f/6.3 GX (M)	137mm f/2.9	f/6.3–64	82	1,100 g (2.4 lb)	101×107×139 mm (4.0×4.2×5.5 in)	5/5	229	
Telephoto lenses
500mm f/8.0 GX (M)	229mm f/3.7	f/8–64	82	1,660 g (3.66 lb)	101×107×245 mm (4.0×4.2×9.6 in)	6/6	395	Supplied with an optional mounting rail, which stabilises the lens but prevents camera movements entirely. Tilt functions not usable. Introduced in 1999.
Zoom lenses
100–200mm f/5.6 GX (M)	46–92mm f/2.6	f/5.6–64	105	2,150 g (4.74 lb)	118×118.5×176 mm (4.6×4.7×6.9 in)	14/11	398	optional (not supplied) mount of support rail under the camera and a support ring on the lens is necessary, tilt functions not usable, 80mm rail extension cannot be used

A Lens Board Adapter accessory permits the use of large-format camera lenses fitting Linhof Technika type lens boards, but the shutter of these lenses is not controlled by the Fuji GX680, so they must be pre-focussed and then manually triggered after the mirror is locked up. The adapter is intended for use with Fujinon-W 180, 210, 250mm; Fujinon-SF 180mm; Fujinon-A 180, 240; and Fujinon-T 300mm lenses.

== Accessories ==
As the Fuji GX680 series are system cameras there is a wide range of accessories:

- Viewfinders:
  - Folding waist level viewfinder (default), including a pop-up 2.5× magnifier with -1 diopter lens
    - Alternative 2.5× magnifier lenses were available for the waist level finder with different diopter powers: -4, -3, 0, +1, +2, +3
  - "Magnifying Hood" (waist level, equipped with a 4× loupe that can be moved over the focusing screen area)
  - Angle Finder (eye-level viewing, adjustable diopter)
  - AE viewfinders - each equipped with centre-weighted Exposure Meter (including flash), enabling aperture priority autoexposure:
    - "AE Finder FL" (waist level, view from above)
    - "AE Finder III" (eye-level, adjustable diopter)
  - Focusing Screens (especially for different formats on model III)
- Carrying:
  - Neck-strap (model III default accessory) & Neck-strap-set
  - Carrying Case
- Backs/Image capture:
  - Instant film-holder
  - 120/220 Roll Film Holder
  - Film Holder III (introduced with GX680 III) adds interchangeable masks for 6×4.5, 6×6, and 6×7 formats (along with default 6×8 format with no mask) and adjusts the film advance accordingly; the masks must be installed prior to mounting the back on the body, and the format cannot be changed mid-roll. Single model of film holder used with two different interchangeable film-cassettes for 120 and 220 type film.
  - Digital Back Fujifilm DBP for GX680
  - Mosaic Engineering Luma / Luma II (digital backs with a 36 mm × 24 mm (1.42 in × 0.94 in) sensor; resolution is 3072×2048 (Luma) or 4008×2672 (Luma II); requires host computer)
  - Film-Holder Adaptors for Hasselblad 6×6, Contax 645 and Mamiya 645 backs (other makers digital backs can also be mounted to Fuji GX680 by interchangeable mounts, most digital backs have smaller formats than 6×4.5 format)
- Miscellaneous:
  - Extension Rail Sets to extend the standard (65mm) Focus-Rail
    - 40mm
    - 80mm (introduced with GX680 II)
  - Bellows for long focus-movement or wide angle-lenses
  - 1m and 5m Remote Release
  - Bellows-Lens-Shades, Lens-Hoods
  - Rechargeable Battery, Charger, Battery Holder

== Gallery ==
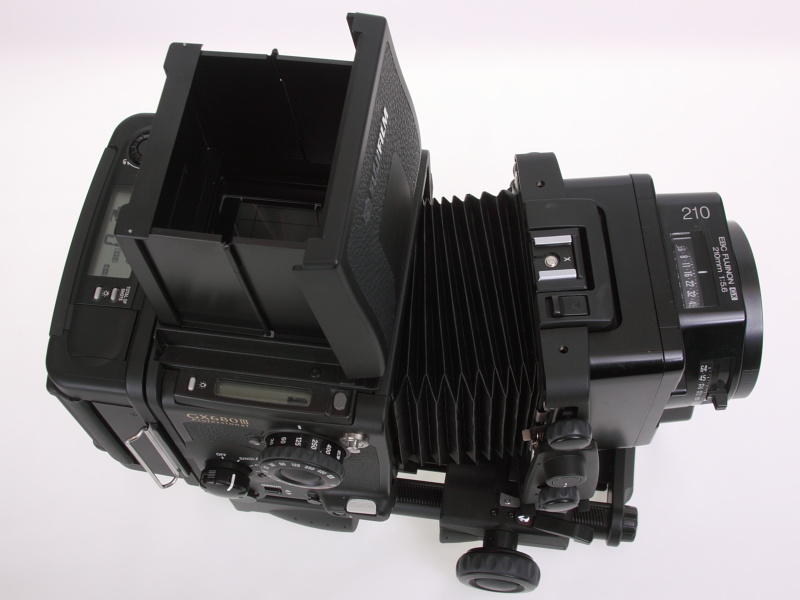
Fuji GX680III Professional Body with Long-Bellows, Folding Waist-level Finder, Roll Film Holder IIIN (landscape orientation) and EBC Fujinon Lens GX 210mm 1:5.6 (Tilt left, Shift left)

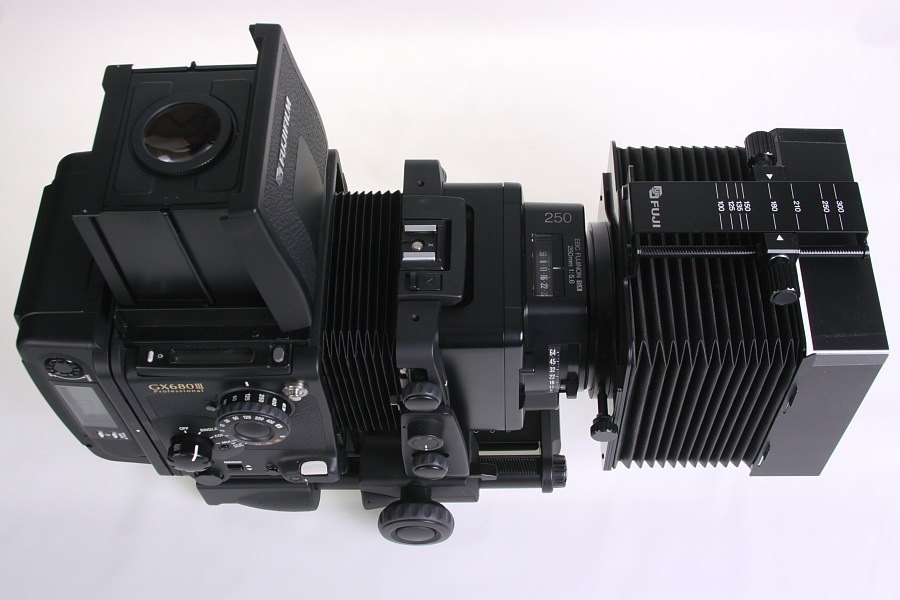
Fuji GX680III Professional Body with Long-Bellows, Folding Waist-level Finder with flipped up Magnifier, Roll Film Holder IIIN (portrait orientation) and EBC Fujinon Lens GX 250mm 1:5.6 with mounted Bellows Lens Shade II

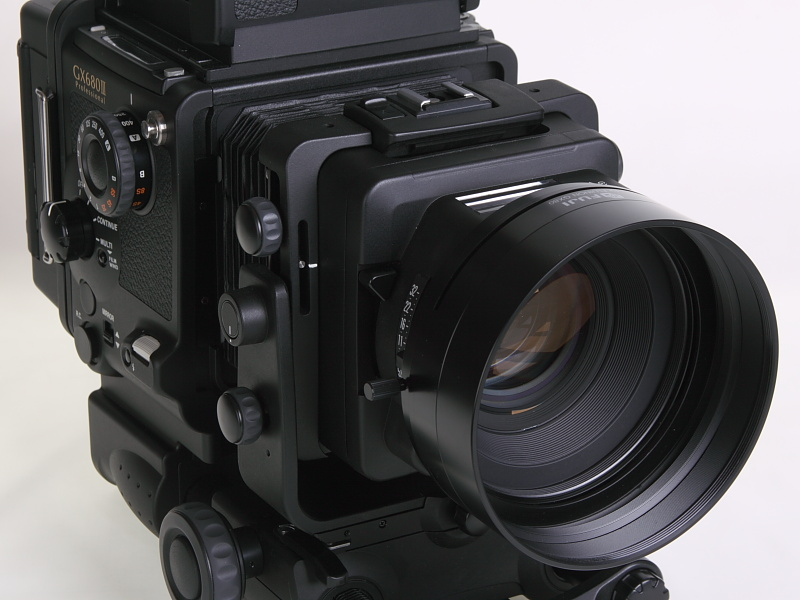
Fuji GX680III Professional Body with Standard-Belows, Folding Waist-level Finder, Roll Film Holder IIIN (landscape orientation) and EBC Fujinon Lens GX MD 125mm 1:3.2 with mounted Lens Hood GX80mm

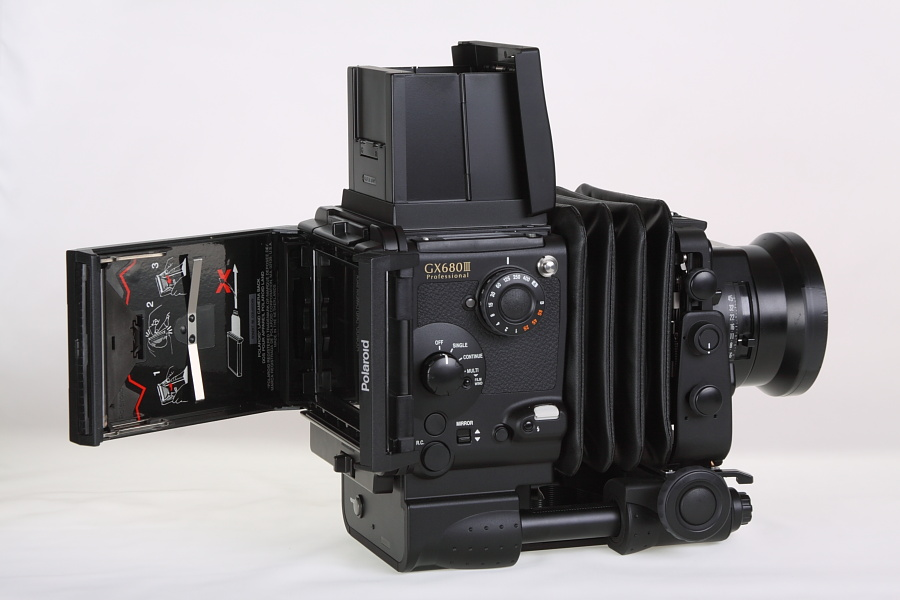
Fuji GX680III Professional Body with Extended Wideangle Bellows, Folding Waist-level Finder, EBC Fujinon Lens GX 65mm 1:5.6 and opened Instant Film Holder II

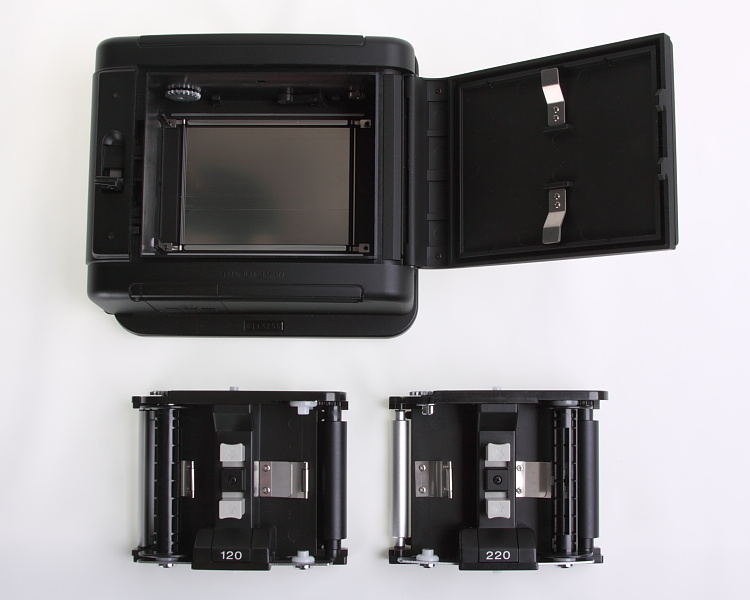
back-view of opened Roll Film Holder IIIN with replaceable Film-Cassettes III 120 and 220 for Fuji GX680III Professional

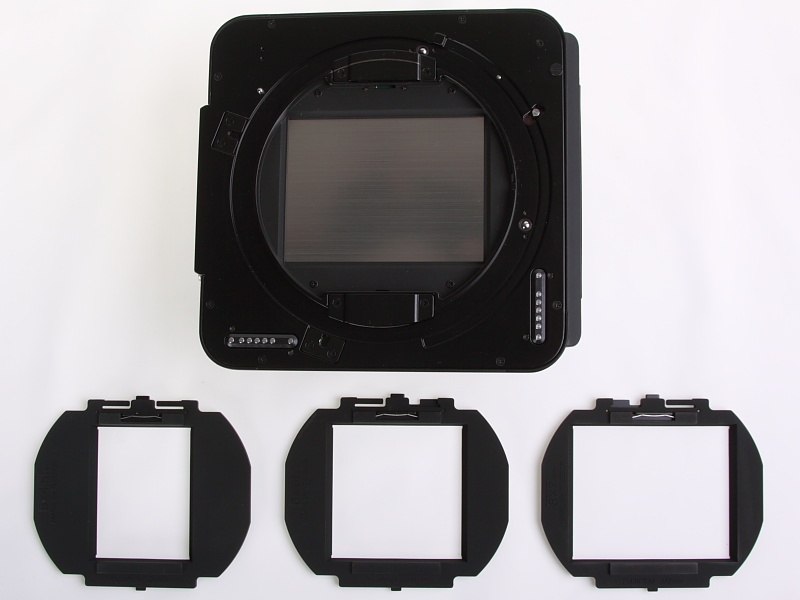
filmside-view of Roll Film Holder IIIN (without Format-Mask in the format 6x8cm) with depicted Format-Masks 6x4.5 cm, 6x6cm, 6x7cm for Fuji GX680III Professional

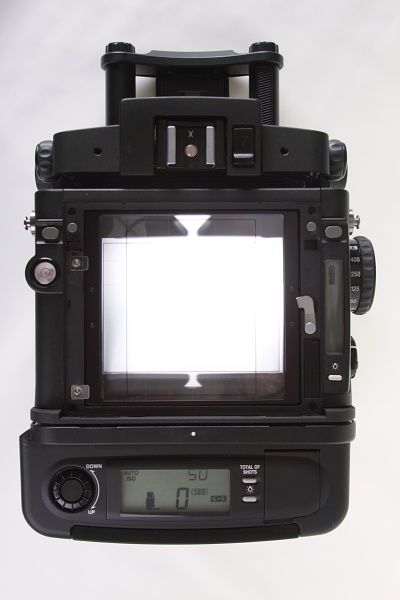
Fuji GX680III Professional viewfinder-mask in landscape-position with Focusing-Screen B

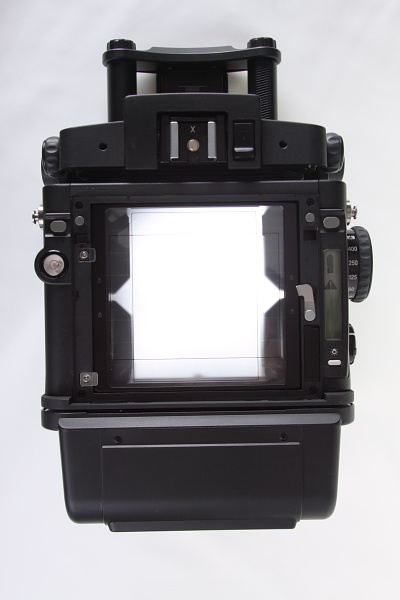
Fuji GX680III Professional viewfinder-mask in portrait-position with Focusing-Screen B

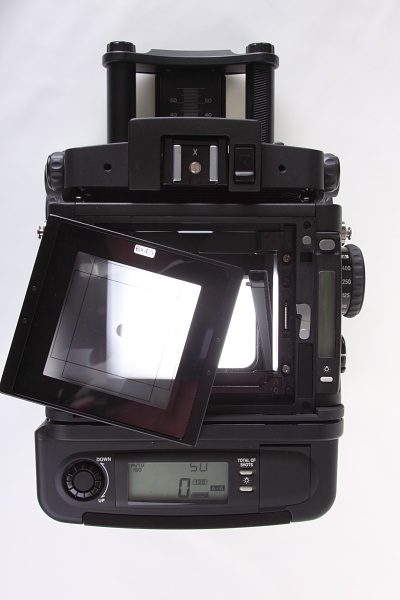
Fuji GX680III Professional with interchangeable Focusing-Screen 6x4.5 cm

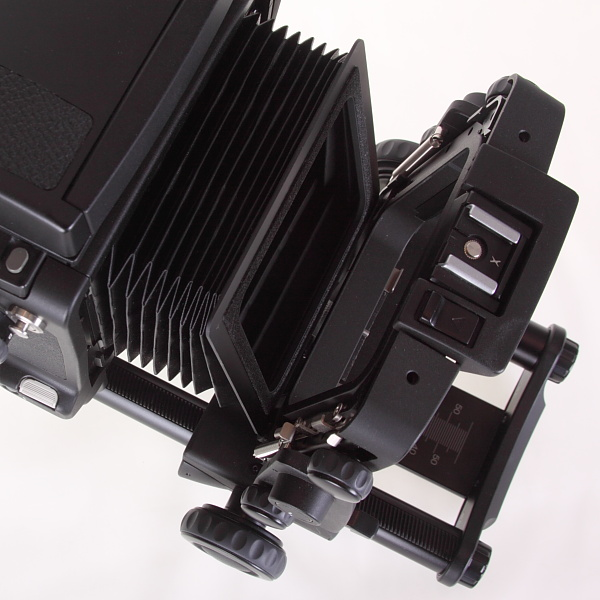
Mounting the Long-Bellows on Fuji GX680III Professional

== See also ==
- Fujifilm Barcode System
