= 135 film =

35 mm photographic film format

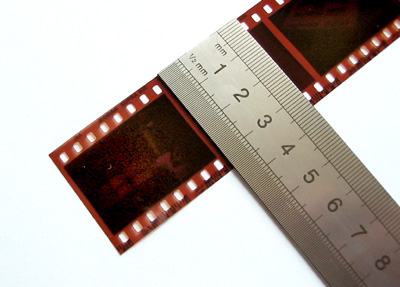
135 film. The film is 35 mm (1.4 in) wide. Each image is 24×36 mm in the most common "small film" format (sometimes called "double-frame" for its relationship to the "single-frame" 35 mm movie format or full frame after the introduction of 135 sized digital sensors; confusingly, "full frame" was also used to describe the full gate of the movie format half the size).

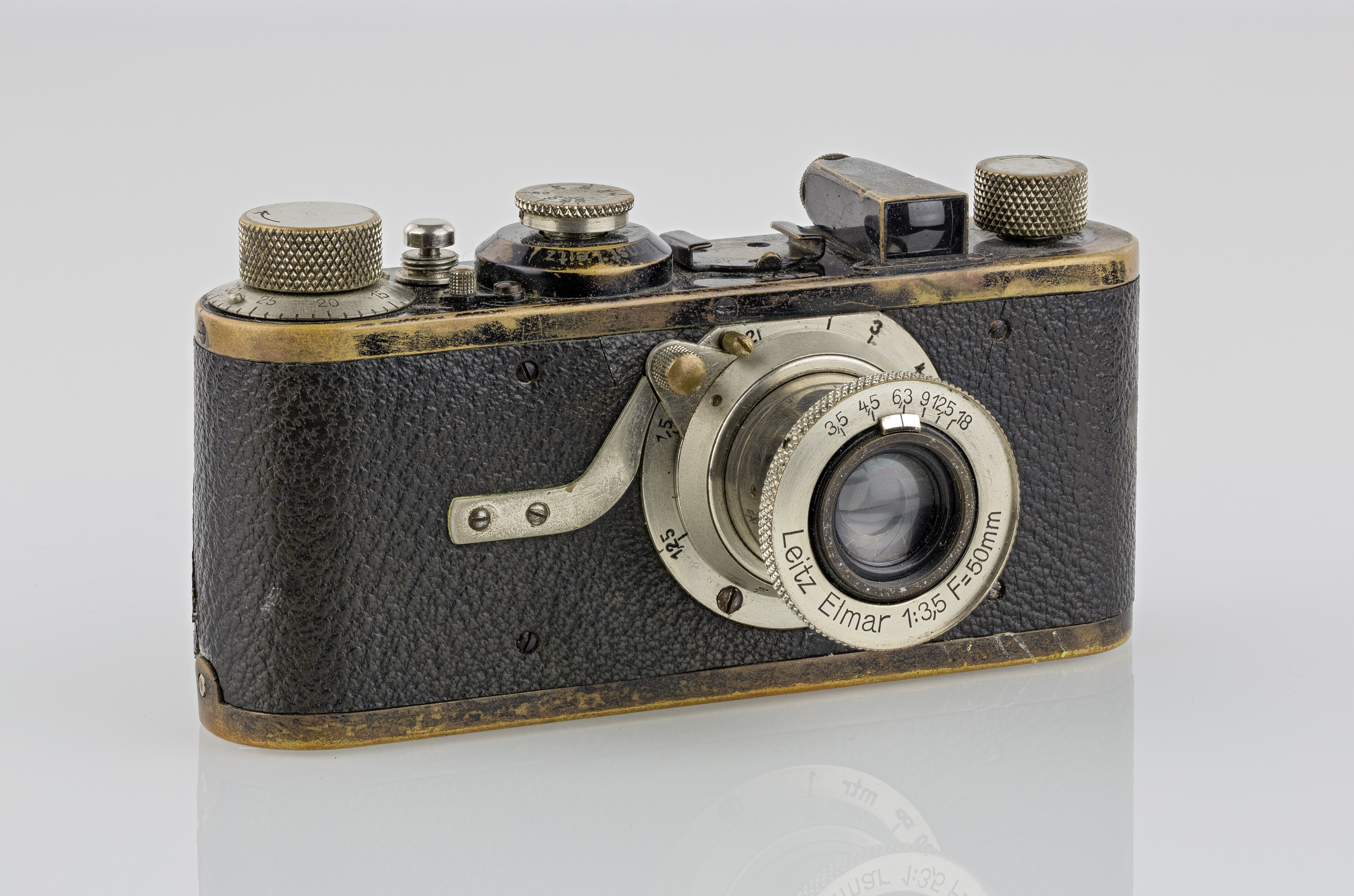
Leica I, 1927, the first successful camera worldwide for 35 cine film

135 film, more popularly referred to as 35 mm film or 35 mm, is a format of photographic film with a film gauge of 35 millimeters (1.4 inches) loaded into a standardized type of magazine (also referred to as a cassette or cartridge) for use in 135 film cameras.

The term 135 was introduced by Kodak in 1934 as a designation for 35 mm film specifically for still photography, perforated with Kodak Standard perforations. It quickly grew in popularity, surpassing 120 film by the late 1960s to become the most popular photographic film size. Despite competition from formats such as 120, 828, 126, 110, Disc and APS, it remains the most popular film size today.

The size of the 135 film frame with its frame's aspect ratio of 2:3 has been adopted by many high-end digital single-lens reflex and digital mirrorless cameras, commonly referred to as "full frame". Even though the format is much smaller than historical medium format and large format film, being historically referred to as miniature format or small format, it is much larger than image sensors in most compact cameras and smartphone cameras.

The engineering standard for this film is controlled by ISO 1007 titled '135-size film and magazine'.

== History ==
=== 35 mm still cameras ===
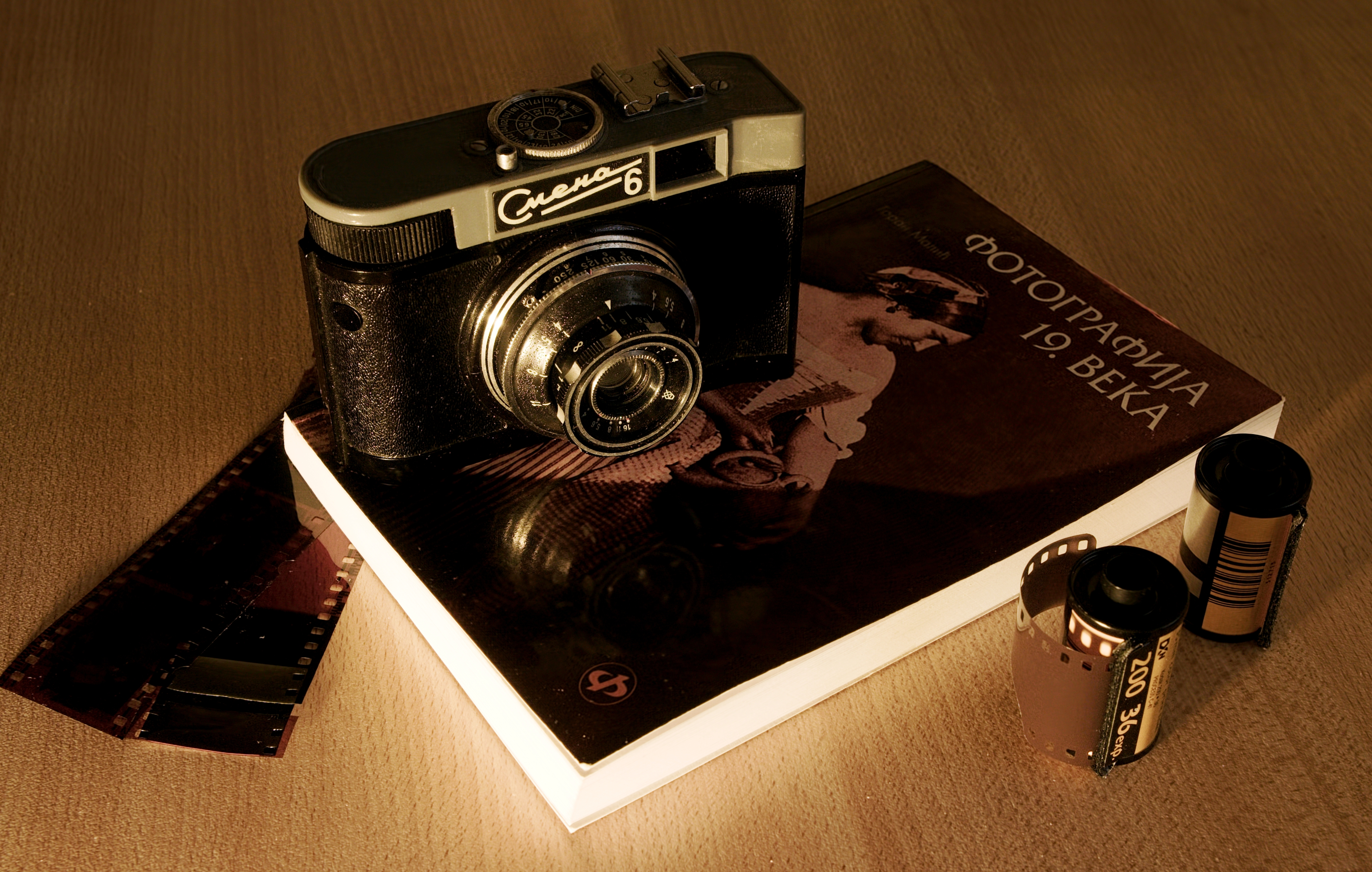
Soviet camera Smena 6 with 35 mm films

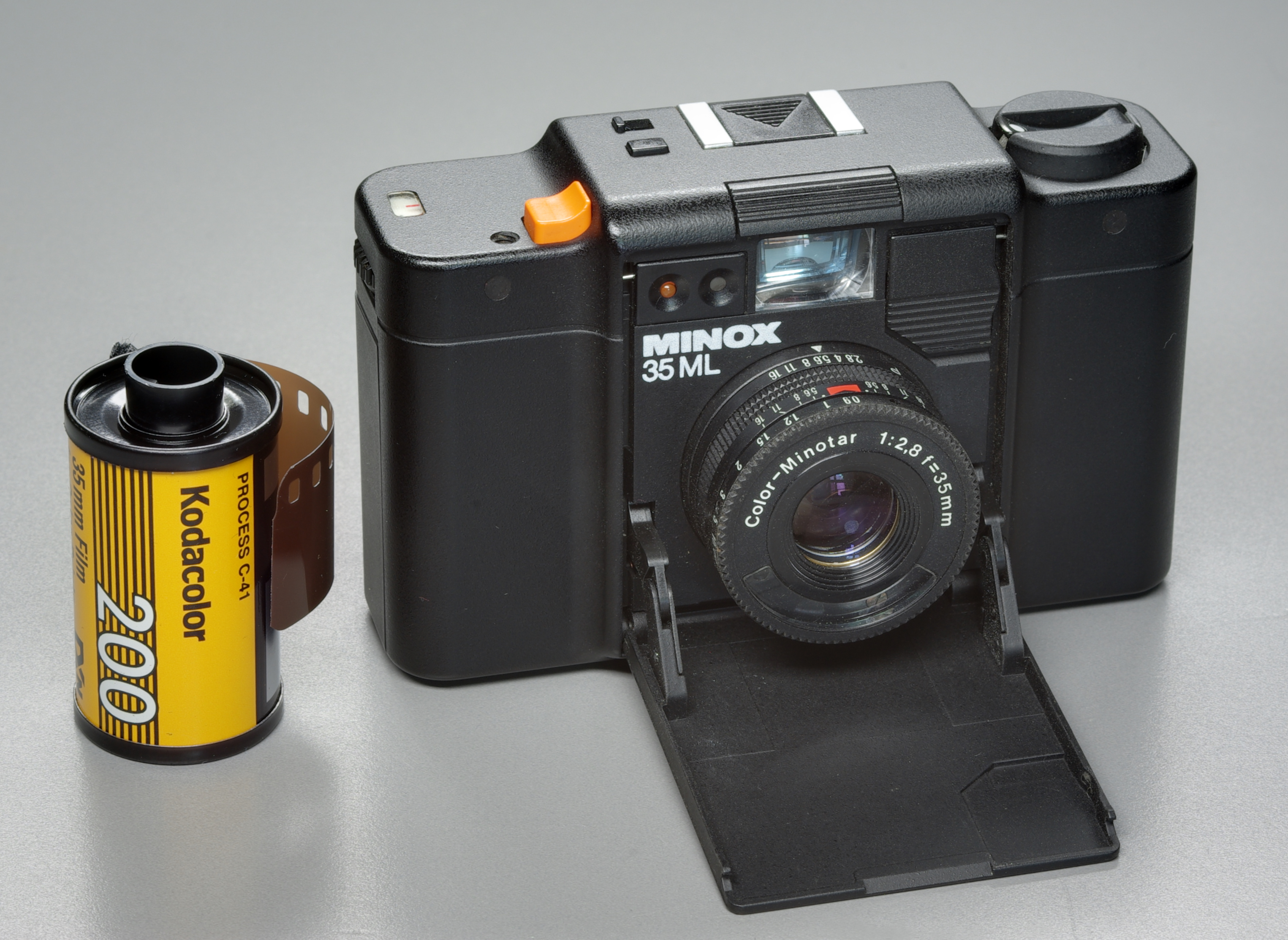
Minox 35 ML, one of the smallest cameras built for the 135 film

The 135 film size is derived from earlier still cameras using lengths of 35 mm movie film, which had the same size but with different perforations. The 35 mm film standard for motion picture film was established in Thomas Edison's lab by William Kennedy Laurie Dickson. Dickson took 70 mm film stock supplied by George Eastman's Eastman Kodak Company. The 70 mm film was cut lengthwise into two equal width (35 mm) strips, spliced together end to end, and then perforated along both edges. The original picture size was 18×24 mm (half the full frame size later used in still photography). There were four perforations on each side of a motion picture frame.

While the Leica camera popularized the format, several 35 mm still cameras used perforated movie film before the Leica was introduced in the 1920s. The first patent for one was issued to Leo, Audobard, and Baradat in England in 1908. The first full-scale production camera was the Homéos, a stereo camera produced by Jules Richard in 1913 and sold until 1920. It took 18x24 mm stereo pairs and used two Tessar lenses.

In 1909, the French Étienne Mollier designed a device for small-format photography, the "Cent-Vues", which used the 35 mm perforated film to take consecutive hundred views in 18×24 mm. He manufactured it, won the gold medal in the Concours Lépine, and in 1910 sold at a small scale and without much success.

The first big-selling 35 mm still camera was the American Tourist Multiple, which also appeared in 1913, at a cost of $175 (~5,600 US Dollars in 2024) The first camera to take full-frame 24×36 mm exposures seems to be the Simplex, introduced in the U.S. in 1914. It took either 800 half-frame or 400 full-frame shots on 50 ft (15.2 m) rolls.

The Minigraph, by Levy-Roth of Berlin, another half-frame small camera was sold in Germany in 1915. The patent for the Debrie Sept camera, a combination 35 mm still and movie camera was issued in 1918; the camera sold from 1922.

The Furet camera made and sold in France in 1923 took full-frame 24x36 mm negatives, and was the first cheap small 35 mm camera of similar appearance to more modern models.

=== Leica ===
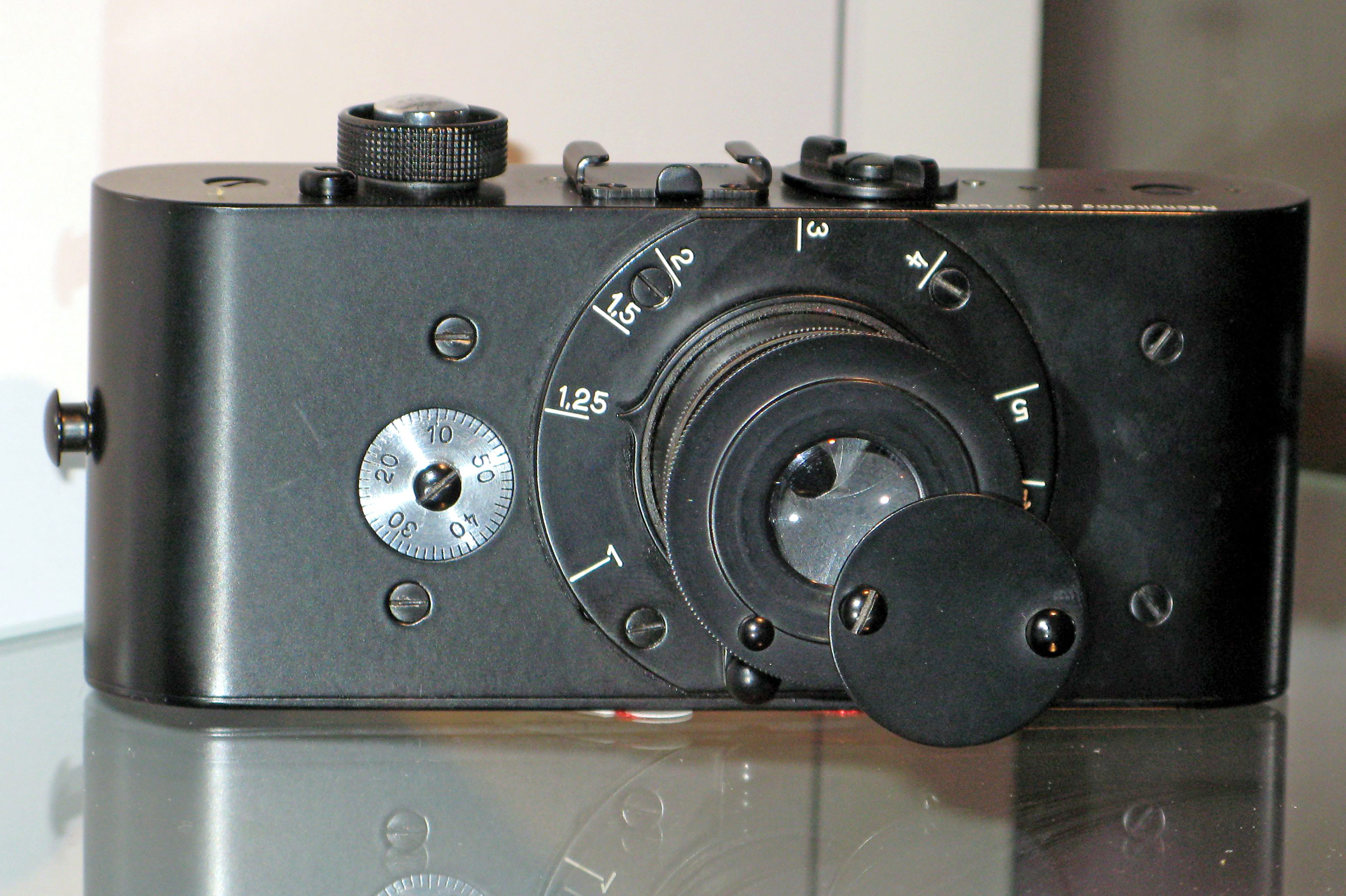
Replica of a Leica prototype, 1913

The Leica Camera designed by Oskar Barnack used 35 mm film, and proved that a format as small as 24 mm × 36 mm was suitable for professional photography.

Although Barnack designed his prototype camera around 1913, the first experimental production run of ur-Leicas (Serial No. 100 to 130) did not occur until 1923. Full-scale production of the Leica did not begin until 1925. While by that time, there were at least a dozen other 35 mm cameras available, the Leica was a success. It came to be associated with the format, mostly because of this 35 mm popularity, as well as the entire company legacy. Early Leica cameras are considered highly collectable items. The original Leica prototype holds the record as being the world's most expensive camera, selling for €2.16 million in 2012.

=== Pre-loaded cassettes and Kodak Retina cameras ===
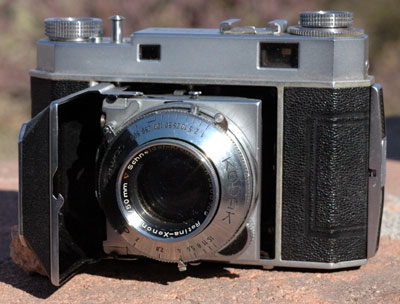
Kodak Retina II

In the earliest days, the photographer had to load the film into reusable cassettes and, at least for some cameras, cut the film leader. In 1934, Kodak introduced a 135 daylight-loading single-use cassette. This cassette was engineered so that it could be used in both Leica and Zeiss Ikon Contax cameras along with the camera for which it was invented, namely the Kodak Retina camera. The Retina camera and this daylight loading cassette were the invention of Dr. August Nagel of the Kodak AG Dr. Nagel Werk in Stuttgart. Kodak bought Dr. August Nagel's company in December, 1931, and began marketing the Kodak Retina in the summer of 1934. The first Kodak Retina camera was a Typ 117. The 35 mm Kodak Retina camera line remained in production until 1969. Kodak also introduced a line of American made cameras that were simpler and more economical than the Retina. Argus, too, made a long-lived range of 35 mm cameras; notably the Argus C3. Kodak launched 135-format Kodachrome color film in 1936. AGFA followed with the introduction of Agfacolor Neu later in the same year.

The designations 235 and 435 refer to 35 mm film in daylight-loading spools, that could be loaded into Contax or Leica style reusable cassettes, respectively, without need of a darkroom. The 335 was a daylight loading spool for the 24 × 23 mm stereo format.

=== Reflex cameras ===
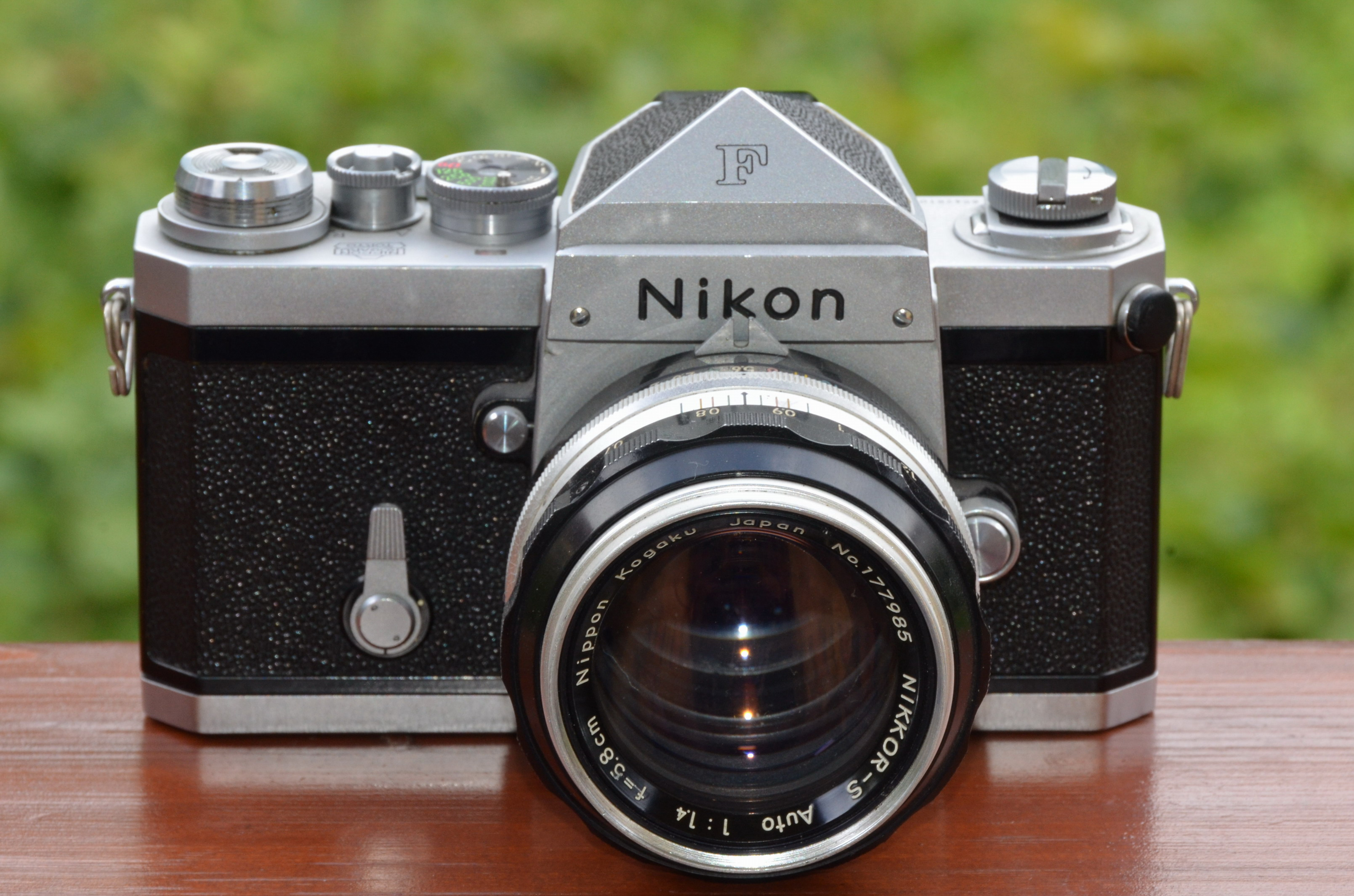
Nikon F chrome with eyelevel prism and NIKKOR-S Auto 1:1,4 f=5,8cm lens (1959) – an early SLR system camera

Reflex viewfinders, both twin-and single-lens, had been used with earlier cameras using plates and rollfilm.

The first 35 mm single-lens reflex (SLR) was the Kine Exakta, introduced in 1936. World War II interrupted development of the type. After the war, Exakta resumed development and the Contax S model with the now familiar pentaprism viewing feature was introduced in 1949. In the 1950s, the SLR also began to be produced in Japan by such companies as Asahi and Miranda. Asahi's Pentax introduced the instant-return mirror, important for the popularity of SLRs; until then, the viewfinder on an SLR camera blanked as the mirror sprang out of the optical path just before taking the picture, returning when the film was wound on. Nikon's F model, introduced in March 1959, was a system camera that greatly improved the quality and utility of 35 mm format cameras, encouraging professionals (especially photojournalists) to switch from larger format cameras to the versatile, rugged, and fast SLR design. Numerous other film formats waxed and waned in popularity, but by the 1970s, interchangeable-lens SLR cameras and smaller rangefinders, from expensive Leicas to "point-and-shoot" pocket cameras, were all using 35 mm film, and manufacturers had proliferated.

Color films improved, both for print negatives and reversal slides, while black-and-white films offered smoother grain and faster speeds than previously available. Since 35 mm was preferred by both amateur and professional photographers, makers of film stock have long offered the widest range of different film speeds and types in the format. The DX film-speed encoding system was introduced in the 1980s, as were single-use cameras pre-loaded with 35 mm film and using plastic lenses of reasonable enough quality to produce acceptable snapshots. Automated all-in-one processing and printing machines made 35 mm developing easier and less expensive, so that quality color prints became available not only from photographic specialty stores, but also from supermarkets, drugstores, and big box retailers, often in less than an hour.

=== From 1996 to the present ===
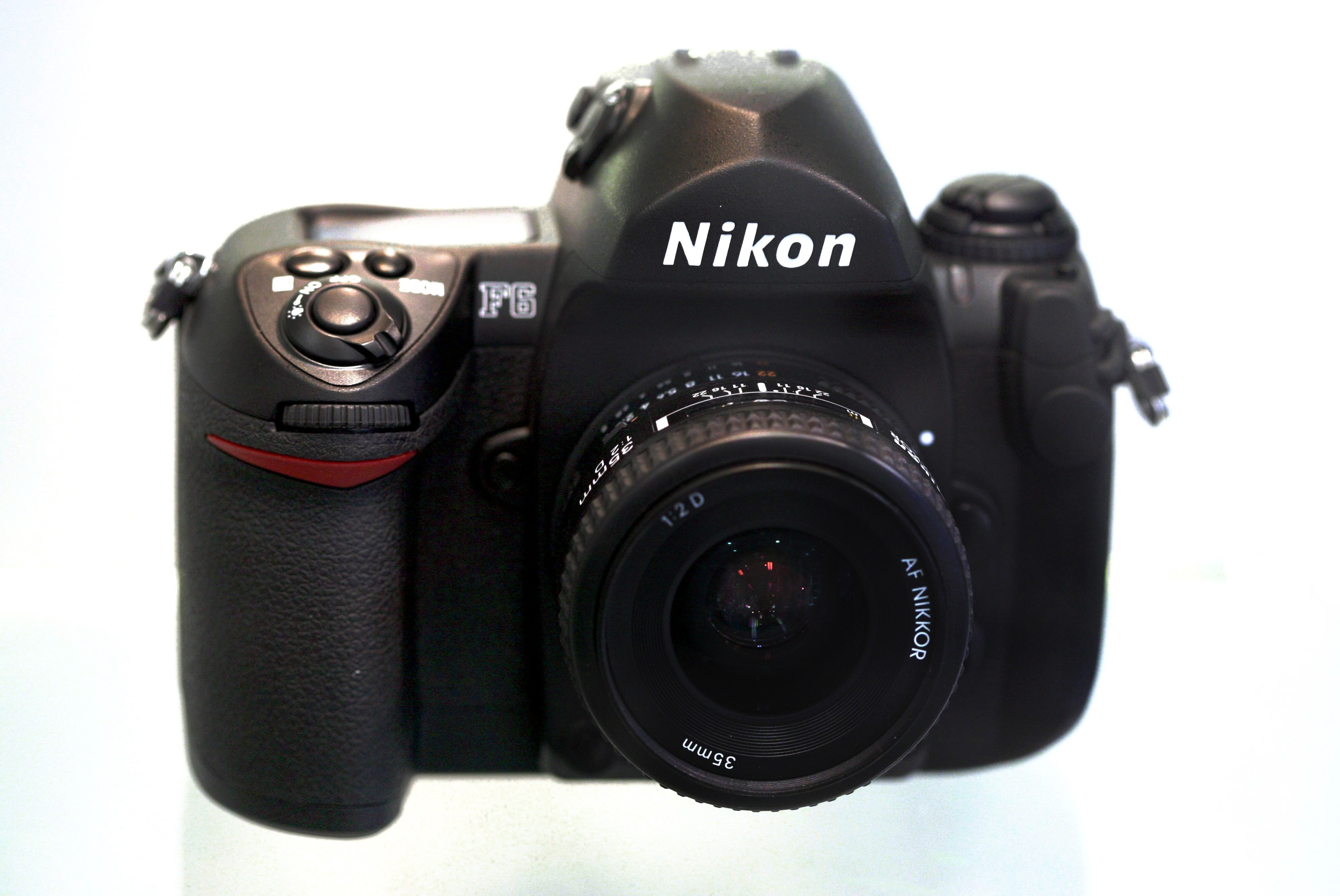
Nikon F6 – The last Nikon F series 35mm SLR introduced in 2004, which remained in production until October 2020

In 1996, a smaller format called Advanced Photo System (APS) was introduced by a consortium of photographic companies in an attempt to supersede 135 film. Due in part to its small negative size, APS was not taken seriously as a professional format, despite the production of APS SLRs. In the point-and-shoot markets at which the format was primarily aimed, it enjoyed moderate initial success, but still never rivalled the market penetration of 135. Within five years of its launch, cheap digital compact cameras started becoming widely available, and APS sales plummeted.

While they have shifted the vast majority of their product lines to digital, major camera manufacturers such as Canon and Nikon continued to make expensive professional-grade 35 mm film SLRs until relatively recently (such as the Canon EOS-1V (discontinued in 2018) and the Nikon F6 (discontinued in 2020).

Introductory 35 mm SLRs, compact film point-and-shoot cameras, and single-use cameras continue to be built and sold by a number of makers. Leica introduced the digital Leica M8 rangefinder in 2007, but continues to make its M series rangefinder film cameras and lenses. A digital camera back for the Leica R9 SLR camera was discontinued in 2007. On March 25, 2009, Leica discontinued the R9 SLR and R-series lenses.

By the early 2020s, film photography, particularly 35 mm photography, was experiencing a resurgence in popularity. In a 2021 PetaPixel survey, 75% of respondents expressed interest in newly manufactured analog cameras. Kodak reported in 2022 that it was having trouble keeping up with demand for 35 mm film.

In 2024, the Pentax 17 and the Aflie TYCH+ 35 mm cameras were released, both using the half-frame format to conserve film. Retrospekt and Mattel put out the Malibu Barbie FC-11 35 mm camera. In September 2024, MiNT Camera took pre-orders for the Rollei 35AF, an update of the Rollei 35. Kodak offered six 35 mm film cameras for sale as of October 2024, including the Ektar H35N, another half-frame camera.

== Characteristics ==
=== Cassette ===
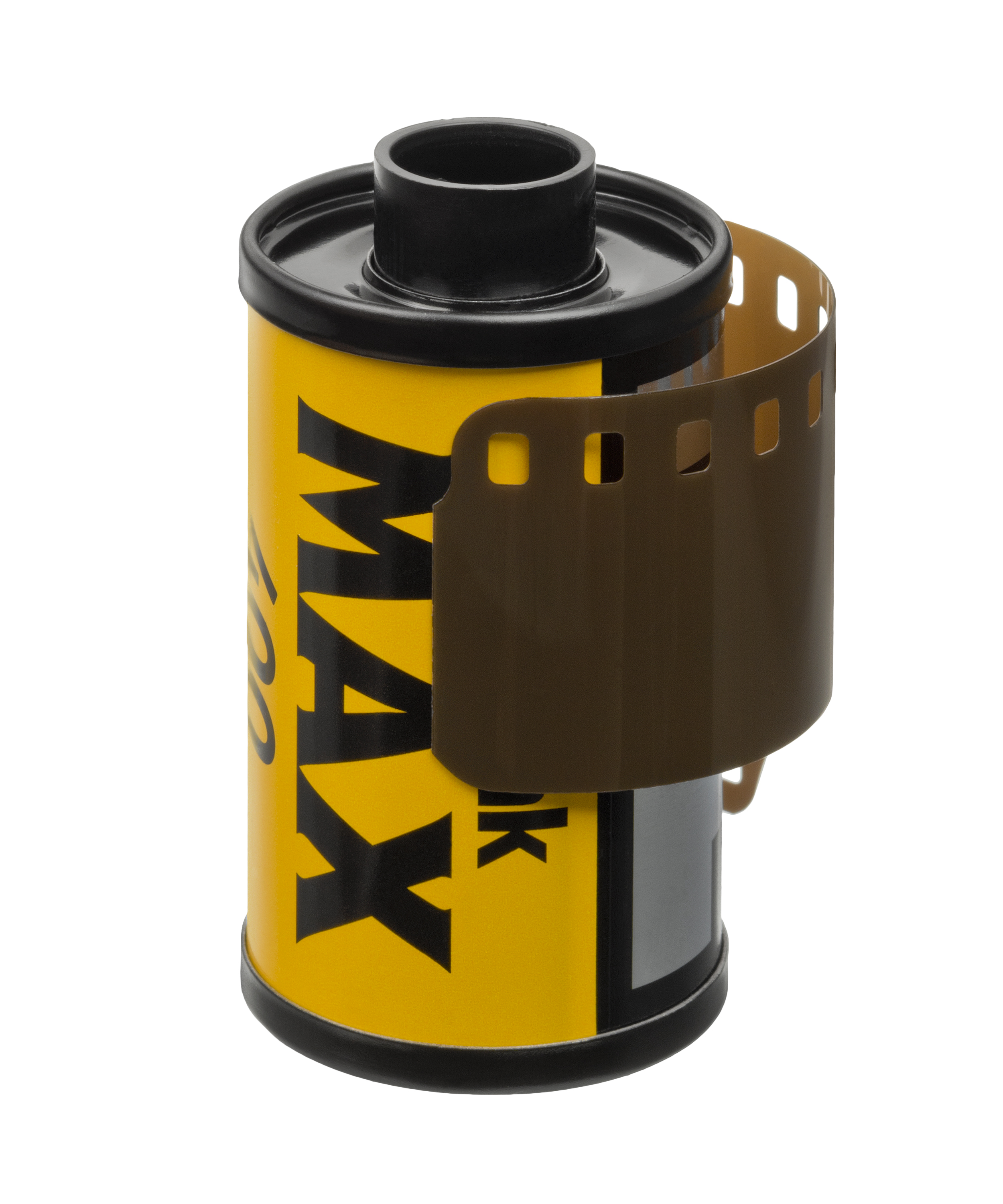
A roll of Kodak 135 film for cameras

Individual rolls of 135 film are enclosed in single-spool, light-tight, metal cassettes, also known as film canisters, to allow cameras to be loaded in daylight. The film is clipped or taped to a spool and exits via a slot lined with flocking. The end of the film is cut on one side to form a leader. It has the same dimensions and perforation pitch as 35 mm movie print film (also called "long pitch", KS-1870, whereas 35 mm professional motion picture camera films are always "short pitch", BH-1866).

Most cameras require the film to be rewound before the camera is opened. Some motorized cameras unwind the film fully upon loading and then expose the images in reverse order, returning the film to the cassette; this protects all exposed frames (except the last one or two), should the camera back be accidentally opened; unexposed film gets spoiled, however. Disposable cameras use the same technique so that the user does not have to rewind.

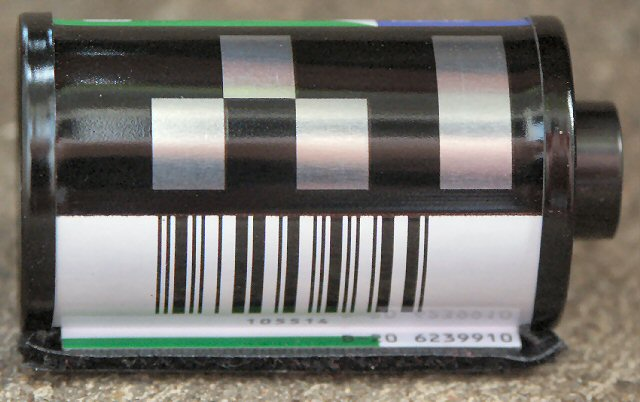
This modern film canister uses DX encoding; it is marked with a six-digit barcode which embeds the DX number below a silver-and-black conductive DX Camera Auto Sensing pattern.

Since 1983, most film cassettes have been marked with a DX encoding six-digit barcode pattern, which uses a DX number to identify the manufacturer and film type (and thus processing method), and the number of exposures, for the use of photofinishing laboratories. The cassettes are also manufactured with a Camera Auto Sensing code constructed as two rows of six rectangular areas on the metal cassette surface which are either conductive or insulating, representing 32 possible film speeds, eight possible film lengths, and four possible values of exposure tolerance or latitude. Conforming cameras detect at least some of these areas; only three contacts are needed to set a light meter for the four most popular film speeds.

=== Film type and speed ===
The 135 film has been made in several emulsion types and sensitivities (film speeds) described by ISO standards. Since the introduction of digital cameras the most usual films have color emulsions of ISO 100/21° to ISO 800/30°. Films of lower sensitivity (and better picture quality) and higher sensitivity (for low light) are for more specialist purposes. There are color and monochrome films, negative and positive. Monochrome film is usually panchromatic; orthochromatic has fallen out of use. Film designed to be sensitive to infrared radiation can be obtained, both monochrome and with false-color (or pseudocolor) rendition. More exotic emulsions have been available in 135 than other roll-film sizes.

=== Image format ===
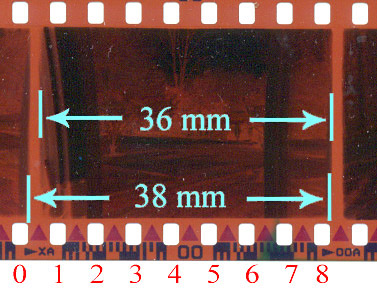
135 frame and perforations

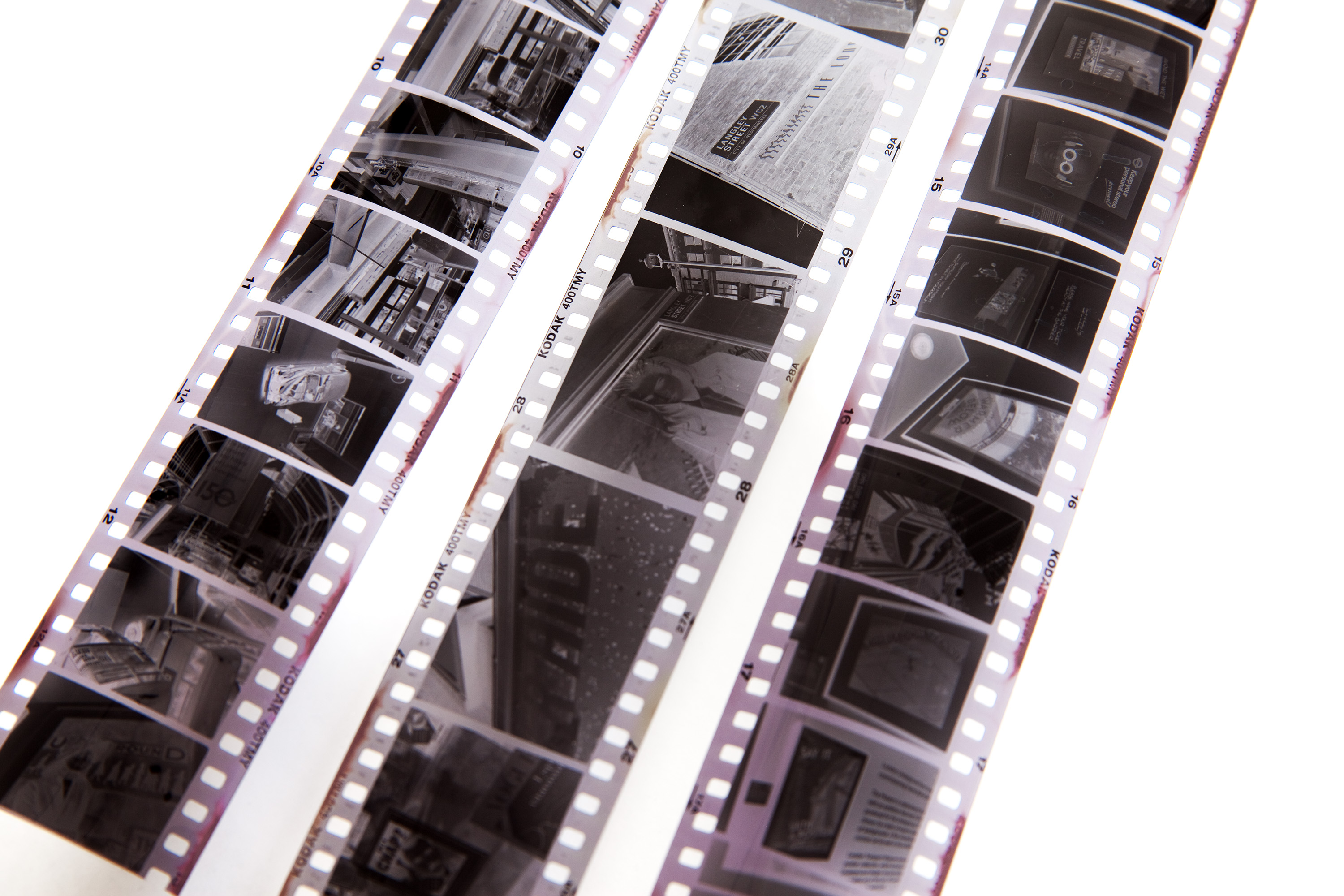
Half-frame negatives (left and right) with standard 35 mm (center)

The term 135 format usually refers to a 24×36 mm film format, commonly known as 35 mm format. The 24×36 mm format is common to higher-end digital image sensors, where it is typically referred to as full-frame format.

On 135 film, the typical cameras produce a frame where the longer dimension of the 24×36 mm frame runs parallel to the length of the film. The perforation size and pitch are according to the standard specification KS-1870. For each frame, the film advances 8 perforations. This is specified as 38.00 mm. This allows for 2 mm gaps between frames. Camera models typically have different locations for the sprocket which advances the film. Therefore, each camera model's frame may vary in position relative to the perforations. The film is approximately 0.14 mm thick.

Other image formats have been applied to 135 film, such as the half-frame format of 18×24 mm which earned some popularity in the 1960s, and the 24×24 mm of the Robot cameras. The successful range of Olympus Pen F cameras utilized the smaller half-frame size, allowing the design of a very compact SLR camera. Unusual formats include the 24×32 mm and 24×34 mm on the early Nikon rangefinders, and 24×23 mm for use with some stereo cameras. In 1967, the Soviet KMZ factory introduced a 24×58 mm panoramic format with its Horizont camera (descendants of which are called, in the Roman alphabet, Horizon). In 1998, Hasselblad and Fuji introduced a 24×65 mm panoramic format with their XPan/TX-1 camera. There is also a 21×14 mm format used by Tessina subminiature camera.

=== Length ===
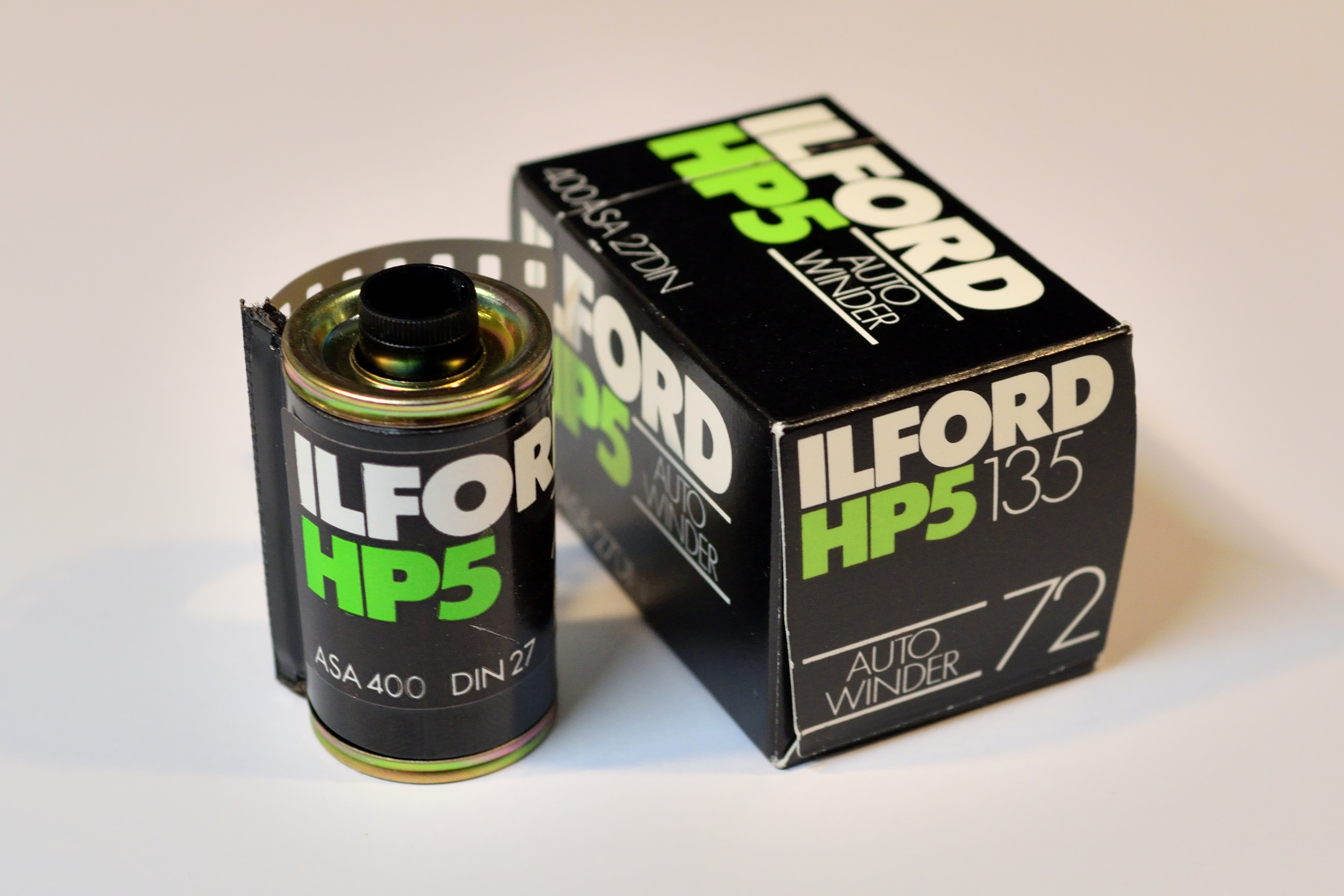
A 72 exposure cartridge of Ilford HP5 film

The film is available in lengths for varying numbers of exposures. The standard full-length roll has always been 36 exposures (assuming a standard 24×36 frame size). Through about 1980, 20 exposure rolls were the only shorter length with widespread availability. Since then, 20 exposure rolls have been largely discontinued in favour of 24- and 12-exposure rolls. The length of the film provided includes the length required for the indicated number of exposures plus sufficient additional length for the film spoiled by being exposed to ambient light when it is drawn out of the canister, across the back of the camera, and securely engaged with the film advancing spool before the camera back is closed. A camera that uses less than the maximum distance between the spools may be able to make one additional exposure. Self-loading cameras that load the film after being closed don't spoil the additional length provided for conventional loading and can make that additional length available for two or three additional exposures. The same length can be available for exposure in any camera if it is loaded without exposing the film to light, e.g. in a dark room or a dark bag. A 27-exposure disposable camera uses a standard 24-exposure cassette loaded in the dark.

Other, mostly shorter, lengths have been manufactured. There have been some 6-, 8-, 10-, and 15-exposure rolls given away as samples, sometimes in disposable cameras, or used by insurance adjusters to document damage claims. Twelve-exposure rolls have been used widely in the daily press. Photographers who load their own cassettes can use any length of film – with a thinner film base, up to 45 exposures will fit.

The Ilford HP black-and-white film, on a thin polyester base, allowed 72 exposures in a single cassette. They produced special reels and tanks to allow this to be processed.

== Use in digital cameras ==
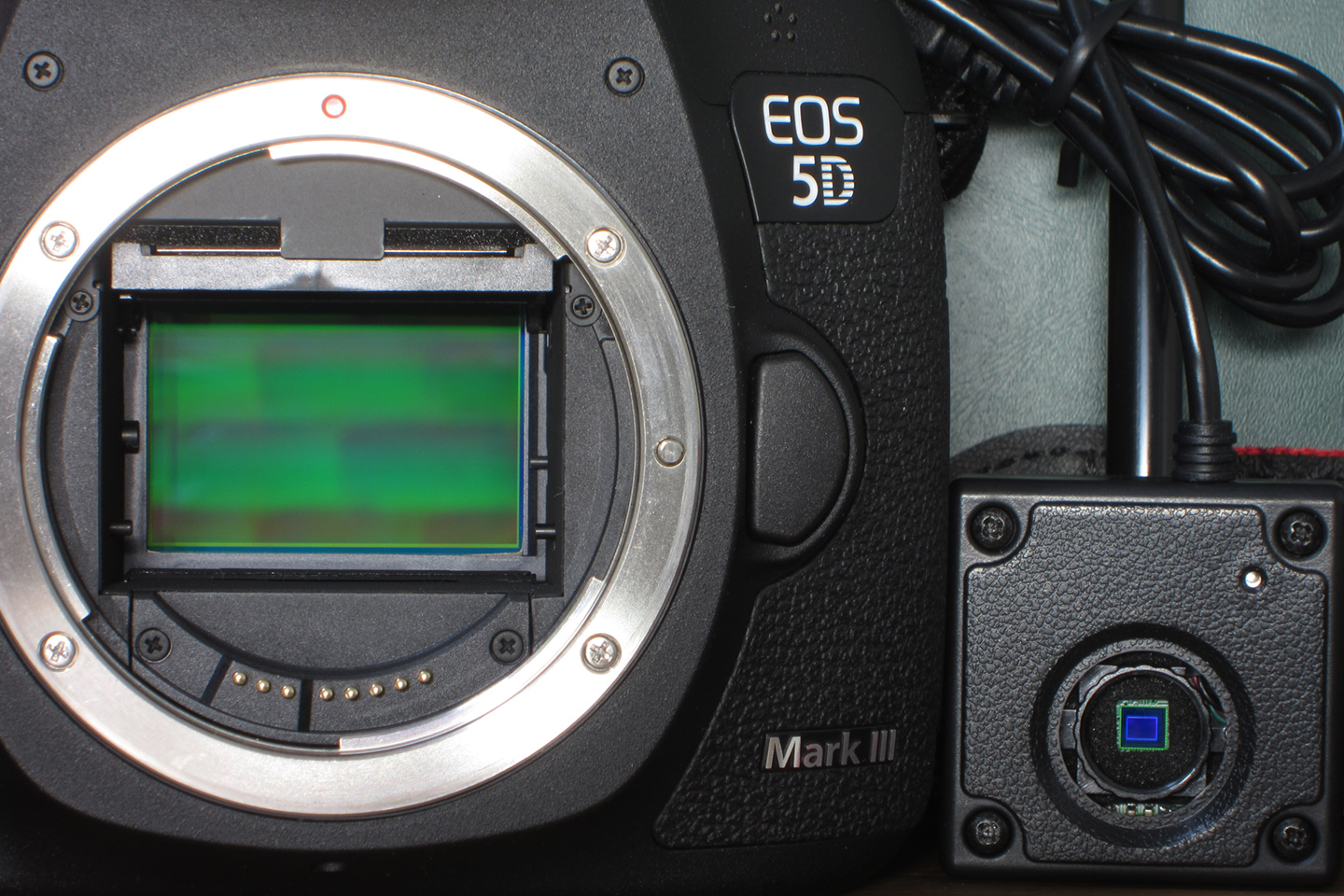
A 35 mm format "full frame" digital image sensor (left, in green) is revealed inside the mirror box of a Canon EOS 5D Mark III DSLR camera.

Digital sensors are available in various sizes. Professional DSLR cameras usually use digital image sensors which approximate the dimensions of the 35 mm format, sometimes differing by fractions of a millimeter on one or both dimensions. Since 2007, Nikon has referred to their 35 mm format by the trademark FX. Other makers of 35 mm format digital cameras, including Leica, Sony, and Canon, refer to their 35 mm sensors simply as full frame.

Most consumer DSLR cameras and many MILCs use smaller sensors, with the most popular size being APS-C which measures around 23×15 mm (giving it a crop factor of 1.5–1.6). Compact cameras have smaller sensors with a crop factor of around 3 to 6.

=== Use in smartphones ===
Most smartphones (as of 2024) have a default aspect ratio of 4:3 (1.33). Mimicking 35mm film in a smartphone requires cropping to a 3:2 (1.5) aspect ratio. For an authentic homage, one can apply creative digital filters like the ones commonly used in Instagram that map the color profile to a characteristic look. Different brands of 35mm film would achieve the creative color profile through a chemical process. For example, Fuji Velvia film gave the photo a characteristic of saturated colors under daylight, high contrast, and exceptional sharpness.

== Lenses ==
A true normal lens for 35 mm format would have a focal length of 43 mm, the diagonal measurement of the format. However, lenses of 43 mm to 60 mm are commonly considered normal lenses for the format, in mass production and popular use. Common focal lengths of lenses made for the format include 24, 28, 35, 50, 85, 105, and 135 mm. Most commonly, a 50 mm lens is the one considered normal; any lens shorter than this is considered a wide angle lens and anything above is considered a telephoto lens. Even then, wide angles shorter than 24 mm is called an extreme wide angle. Lenses above 50 mm but up to about 100 mm are called short telephoto or sometimes, as portrait telephotos, from 100 mm to about 200 mm are called medium telephotos, and above 300 mm are called long telephotos.

With many smaller formats now common (such as APS-C), lenses are often advertised or marked with their "35 mm equivalent" or "full-frame equivalent" focal length as a mnemonic, due to the historic prevalence of the 35 mm format. This 'equivalent' is computed by multiplying (a) the true focal length of the lens by (b) the ratio of the diagonal measurement of the native format to that of the 35 mm format.

As a result, a lens for an APS-C (18×24 mm) format camera body with a focal length of 40 mm, might be described as "60 mm (35 mm equivalent)". Although its true focal length remains 40 mm, its angle of view is equivalent to that of a 60 mm lens on a 35 mm format (24×36 mm) camera. Another example is the lens of the 2/3 inch format Fujifilm X10, which is marked with its true zoom range "7.1–28.4 mm" but has a 35 mm-equivalent zoom range of "28–112 mm".

== See also ==
- List of color film systems
- List of photographic film formats
