= China Lucky Film =

Chinese film equipment company

China Lucky Film Corporation
- Trade name: Lucky Film Co., Ltd.
- Native name: 乐凯胶片
- Traded as: SSE: 600135
- Products: Photographic materials

China Lucky Film Corporation (Chinese: 中国乐凯胶片集团公司) is the largest photosensitive materials and magnetic recording media manufacturer in Baoding, Hebei province, China.

== History ==
Founded in 1958, Lucky Film markets consumer and industrial chemicals and photosensitive products including color, black and white and X-ray film, magnetic audio and video tape and magnetic tape for credit cards and other electronic devices.

Baoding Lucky Digital Imaging Co, a subsidiary of China Lucky Films, produces inkjet photo paper, clear film, and PVC cards with laminating film as well as compatible inks for desktop and large format printers.

Lucky's major competitors in China are America's Eastman Kodak and Japan's FujiFilm. Kodak is the largest supplier in the market holding over 60% market share, but Lucky is extremely strong in the Chinese rural market.

In 2003, Eastman Kodak and China Lucky Film signed a 20-year co-operation agreement. In the agreement, contributed US$45 million in cash and provided an emulsion making line for color products for a 20 per cent stake in Lucky Film. Kodak also provided US$54.5 million and technical support to assist Lucky in upgrading its existing triacetate film base production and coating lines.

In 2007, Kodak retracted from the deal, citing the growth of digital cameras in the Chinese market, having hoped that market would remain with film in the short term.
