= Nikon Small World =

Photo contest

Nikon Small World (Nikon's Small World) is a photographic contest run by Nikon Instruments and a forum for showcasing the beauty and complexity of life as seen through the light microscope. It serves as a window into a world that can only be seen through the lens of an optical microscope. The contest comprises two separate competitions:

- The annual Nikon Small World Photomicrography Competition is open to anyone with an interest in microscopy and photography from the widest array of scientific disciplines. The competition first began in 1975 as a means to recognize the efforts of those involved with photography through the light microscope. Any type of camera equipment and light microscopy technique is acceptable, including phase contrast, polarized light, fluorescence, interference contrast, dark-field, confocal, deconvolution, and mixed techniques.
- The annual Nikon Small World In Motion Competition encompasses any movie or digital time-lapse photography taken through the microscope. The competition was first announced in 2011 as a new category of the Nikon Small World Photomicrography Competition.

All competition entries (in 2021, almost 1,900 images from 88 countries and over 350 movies from 43 countries) are judged each year by an independent panel of four to five experts who are chosen by Nikon as recognized authorities in the area of photomicrography and photography as well as in imaging, science and scientific communications. The entries are assessed based on the originality, informational content, technical proficiency, and visual impact. The judges are not given any brand information.

Winners have included both professionals and amateurs. The prize-winners of each year (top winners and memorable mentions) are exhibited at museums and science centers throughout the United States and Canada. Many winning images are also featured in newspapers and on the covers of scientific and other journals. Nikon does not own the copyright and only requests an image or video release from those who have won for unrestricted permission with relation to the competition.

In 2023, the winning image was of the back of a rat’s eye and of its immune cells. Composed of multiple snapshots captured with a confocal microscope, the photo was taken by neuroscientist Hassanain Qambari of the Lions Eye Institute’s Centre for Ophthalmology and Visual Science in Perth, Australia.

In 2026, a video by Ning Xu of a cilia in the airways of a child with primary ciliary dyskinesia was awarded first prize. The prize was rescinded after Nikon determined use of generative AI by Xu; the first prize was then awarded to Nguyen Nam Nhat for his video of a roundworm and a Dileptus.

== See also ==
- List of photography awards
- List of image-sharing websites
- Nikon
