= Nikon Instruments =

Corporate division

Nikon Instruments is a division of Nikon Corporation, which is headquartered in Tokyo. Its US operations are based in Melville, New York and its European operations in Amstelveen, Netherlands. Nikon Instruments is a specialist in optical instrumentation.

== History ==
The company, Nippon Kōgaku Kōgyō Kabushikigaisha (日本光学工業株式会社 "Japan Optical Industries Co., Ltd."), was formed in 1917 with the merger of three Japanese optical manufacturers to produce precision optical glass. In 1925, the brand expanded to produce the first microscope with a revolving nosepiece and interchangeable objectives – the Joico microscope. Over the next few decades, the microscopy division introduced new polarising and stereomicroscopes, and metrology products for measuring and inspection.

Nikon launched the Optiphot and Labophot microscopes in the 1970's and established the CF Optical system. In the 1980's, they released 80 new products, including the inverted Diaphot microscope, which was used in IVF techniques. The introduction of the Eclipse range of infinity optics in the 1990's was a departure from traditional microscope design. CFI60 optics have high numerical apertures (N.A.s) and long working distances, increased resolution and light-gathering capability and high performance in confocal imaging. The infinity optical system also has the benefit that the distance between the objective and the eyepiece tube is not fixed, allowing a variety of imaging modules to be inserted into the light path without any compromise in optical quality. This has allowed microscopes to be used as versatile imaging workstations that provide users with instant access to several imaging methods. Using a Nikon Diaphot microscope, in 1996, Dolly the sheep was the first mammal to be successfully cloned from an adult cell. Nikon has introduced a series of digital camera systems optimized for microscopy-based applications enabling the digital transfer of images.

== Products ==
Alongside developments in inter-disciplinary, clinical and confocal microscope solutions, Nikon's digital imaging technologies and software solutions support all microscopy and imaging functions, image management and analysis. The Eclipse Ti series of inverted microscopes allow the simultaneous mounting of confocal, TIRF module and multiple stacked epi-fluorescence filter turrets to make this microscope function as a live cell imaging platform. Long term timelapse imaging of living cells is possible in the BioStation series. Nikon partnered with OptraSCAN for accelerating adoption of digital pathology systems and solutions in North America.

Nikon has developed two advanced microscopy systems that can produce significantly higher resolution than conventional optical microscopes. The N-SIM microscopy system combines Structured Illumination Microscopy technology, licensed from UCSF, with Nikon's Eclipse Ti research inverted microscope to produce images with twice the resolution of conventional microscopes. The N-STORM super-resolution microscope system combines “Stochastic Optical Reconstruction Microscopy” technology, licensed from Harvard University, with Nikon's Eclipse Ti to provide a resolution that is 10 times greater than that of conventional optical microscopes. that is 10 times greater than that of conventional optical microscopes.

== Controversies ==
=== 2026 Small World in Motion Competition ===
Since 2011 Nikon Instruments hosts an annual competition for videos taken with microscopes as part of Nikon Small World. The first prize of the 2026 competition was initially awarded to a video claiming to show cilia in motion from a child with primary ciliary dyskinesia. Soon after the announcement of the winner, the authenticity of the video was questioned by microscopy experts, alleging that the video was biologically implausible and that it might have been hallucinated by an AI tool. The creator of the video, Dr. Ning Xu from the Tsinghua University, responded to the accusations with the claim that the video was "enhanced" with AI. He denied that it was entirely artificially generated and did not share an unprocessed version of the video. Nikon Instruments started an investigation and eventually disqualified the video, several weeks after the concerns were initially raised.
