= Nikon =

Japanese multinational corporation

Nikon Corporation
- Logo since 2003

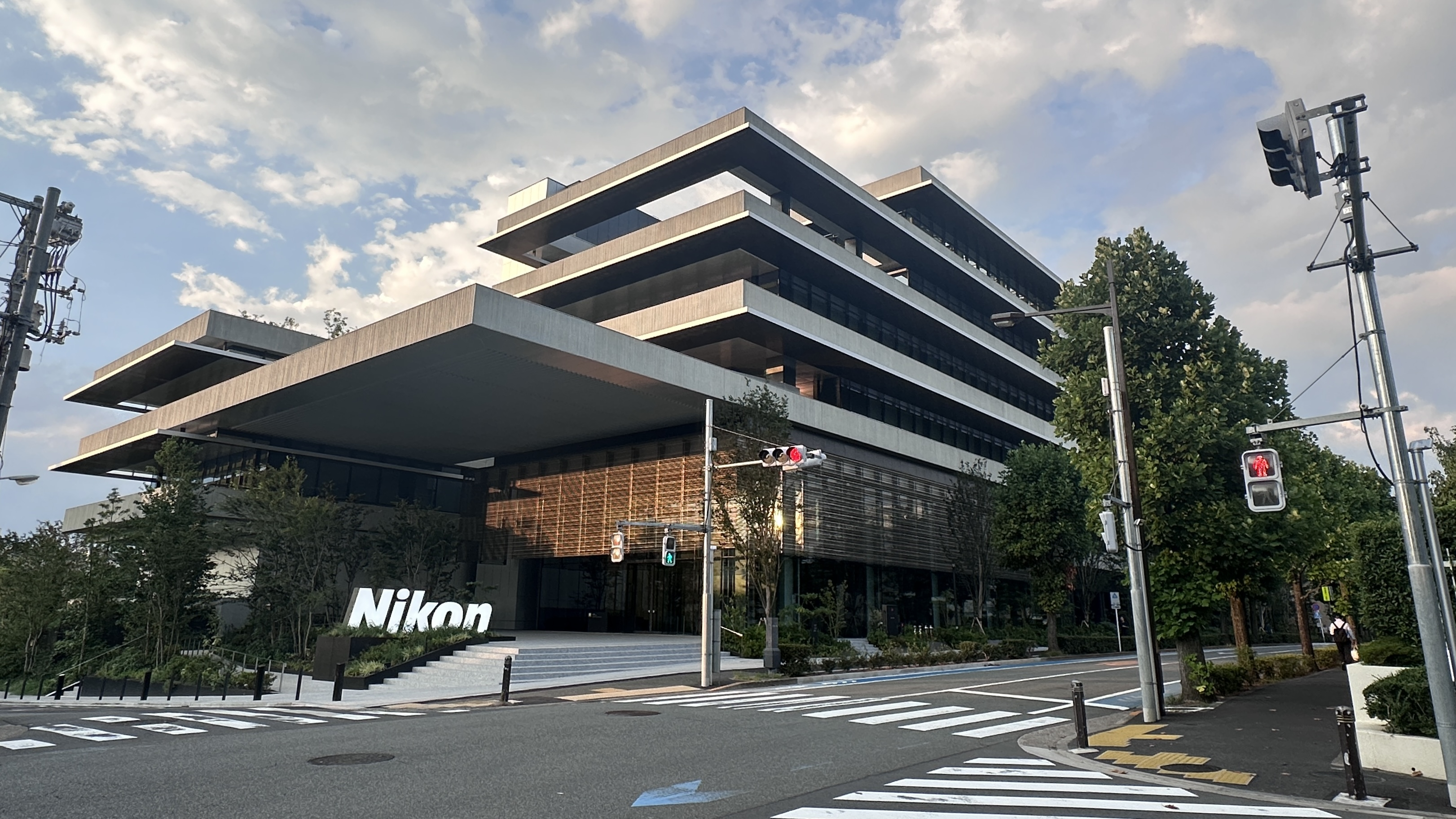
- Nikon headquarters in Shinagawa, Tokyo
- Native name: 株式会社ニコン
- Romanized name: Kabushiki-gaisha Nikon
- Formerly: Nippon Kōgaku Kōgyō Kabushikigaisha (日本光学工業株式会社) (1917–1988)
- Type: Public
- Traded as: TYO: 7731
- Industry: Optics, precision equipment, imaging, healthcare, industrial technology
- Founded: July 26, 1917; 109 years ago Tokyo City
- Headquarters: Nishi-Ōi, Shinagawa, Tokyo, Japan
- Area served: Worldwide
- Key people: Muneaki Tokunari (Chairman); Yasuhiro Ohmura (President, CEO)
- Products: Still cameras, SLR cameras, DSLR cameras, digital cinema cameras, binoculars / monoculars, binocular telescope, laser rangefinder, field microscopy, precision equipment, microscopes, surveying equipment, regenerative medicine solutions, material processing equipment, ophthalmic lenses and many instrumental products
- Brands: Nikon Z; Nikkor; RED Digital Cinema; CineBot
- Revenue: ¥677.163 billion (FY2026)
- Operating income: −¥112.448 billion (FY2026)
- Net income: −¥86.088 billion (FY2026)
- Number of employees: 19,928 (consolidated, March 31, 2026)
- Subsidiaries: Red Digital Cinema; Nikon SLM Solutions AG; Optos plc
- Website: www.nikon.com

Nikon Corporation (株式会社ニコン, Kabushiki-gaisha Nikon) (Japanese: [ɲiꜜkoɴ]; UK: /ˈnɪkɒn/; US: /ˈnaɪkɒn/) is a Japanese manufacturer of optical and precision equipment headquartered in Nishi-Ōi, Shinagawa, Tokyo. Its businesses include cameras and lenses, semiconductor and flat-panel-display lithography systems, microscopes and ophthalmic imaging systems, industrial measurement and inspection equipment, optical components, and metal additive-manufacturing systems.

Founded on July 25, 1917 as Nippon Kōgaku Kōgyō Kabushikigaisha (日本光学工業株式会社; "Japan Optical Industries Co., Ltd."), Nikon initially manufactured optical instruments and later became internationally known for its cameras and Nikkor lenses. It introduced Japan's first commercial LSI stepper in 1980 and changed its corporate name to Nikon Corporation in 1988. Among its notable product lines are the Nikon F-series of 35 mm film SLR cameras, the Nikon D-series of digital SLR cameras, the Nikon Z-series of mirrorless cameras, the Coolpix series of compact digital cameras, and the Nikonos series of underwater film cameras.

Since the 2010s, Nikon has expanded beyond its traditional imaging and precision-equipment businesses into healthcare, industrial technologies and digital manufacturing. It acquired British retinal-imaging company Optos in 2015, German metal additive-manufacturing company SLM Solutions in 2023, and American cinema-camera manufacturer Red Digital Cinema in 2024. For the fiscal year ended March 31, 2026, Nikon reported revenue of ¥677.2 billion, an operating loss of ¥112.4 billion and a loss attributable to owners of the parent of ¥86.1 billion, with the Digital Manufacturing business recording substantial impairment losses.

Nikon is a member of the Mitsubishi group of companies (keiretsu). Its main competitors in camera and lens manufacturing include Canon, Sony, Fujifilm, Panasonic, Pentax, and Olympus.

== History ==
The Nikon Corporation was established on 25 July 1917 when three leading optical manufacturers merged to form a comprehensive, fully integrated optical company known as Nippon Kōgaku Kōgyō K.K. Over the next sixty years, this growing company became a manufacturer of optical lenses (including those for the first Canon cameras) and equipment used in cameras, binoculars, microscopes and inspection equipment.

During World War II, the company expanded its military-optics production, manufacturing binoculars, lenses, bomb sights, and periscopes for the Japanese military.

=== Reception outside Japan ===
After the war, Nippon Kōgaku reverted to producing its civilian product range in a single factory. In 1948, the first Nikon-branded camera was released, the Nikon I. Nikon lenses were popularized by the American photojournalist David Douglas Duncan.

Duncan was working in Tokyo when the Korean War began. Duncan had met a young Japanese photographer, Jun Miki, who introduced Duncan to Nikon lenses. From July 1950 to January 1951, Duncan covered the Korean War. Fitting Nikon optics (especially the NIKKOR-P.C 1:2 f=8.5 cm) to his Leica rangefinder cameras allowed him to produce high contrast negatives with very sharp resolution at the centre field.

=== Names and brands ===
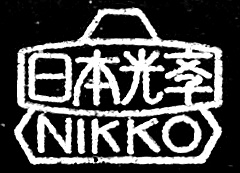
Nikko parent company brand, from which the Nikkor brand evolved

Founded in 1917 as Nippon Kōgaku Kōgyō Kabushikigaisha (日本光学工業株式会社 "Japan Optical Industries Corporation"), the company was renamed Nikon Corporation, after its cameras, in 1988. The name Nikon, which dates from 1946, was originally intended only for its small-camera line, spelled as "Nikkon", with an addition of the "n" to the "Nikko" brand name. The similarity to the Carl Zeiss AG brand "ikon", would cause some early problems in Germany as Zeiss complained that Nikon violated its trademarked camera. From 1963 to 1968 the Nikon F in particular was therefore labeled 'Nikkor'.

The Nikkor brand was introduced in 1932, a westernised rendering of an earlier version Nikkō (日光), an abbreviation of the company's original full name (Nikkō also means "sunlight" and is the name of a famous Japanese onsen town.). Nikkor is the Nikon brand name for its lenses.

Another early brand used on microscopes was Joico, an abbreviation of "Japan Optical Industries Co".

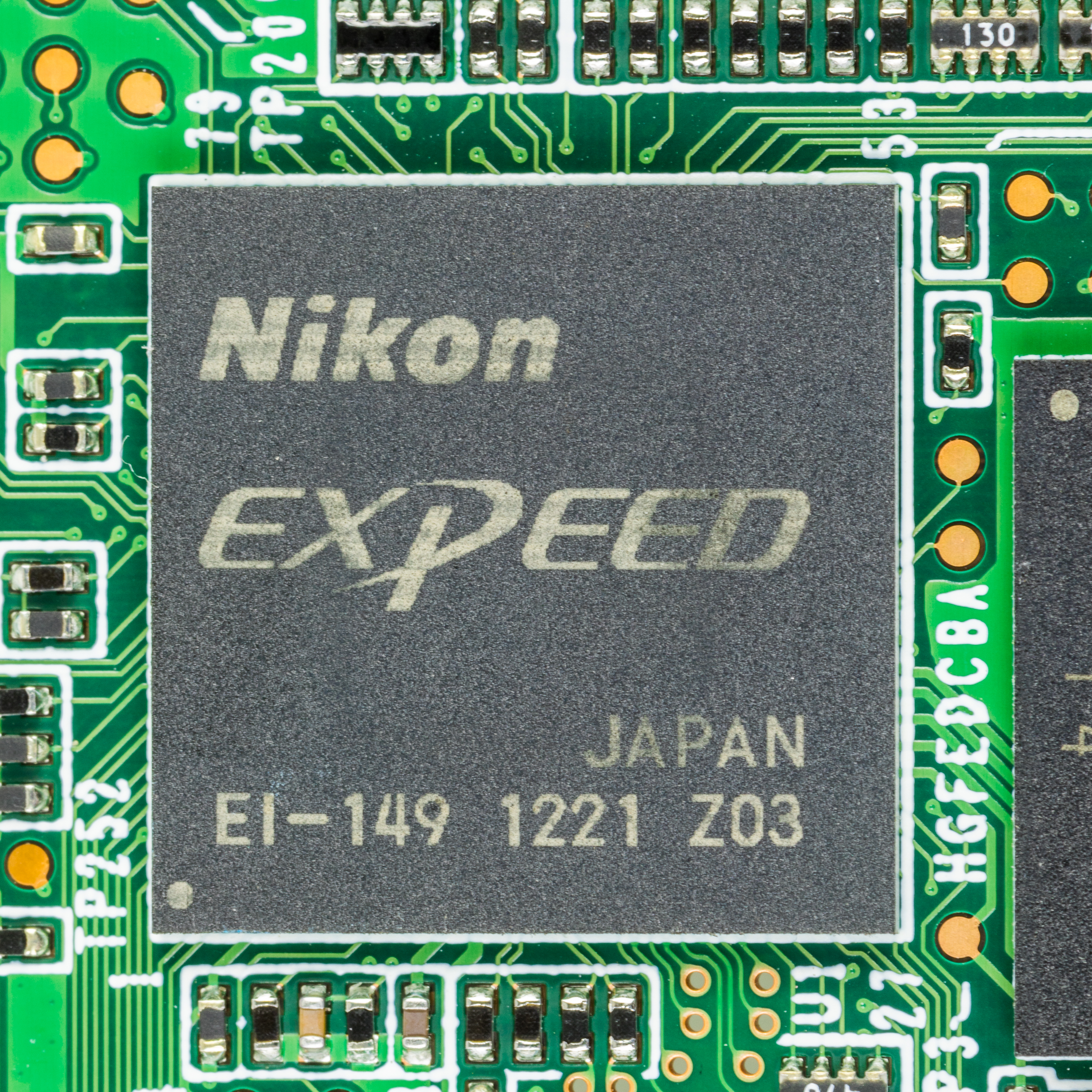
Nikon Expeed chip

Expeed is the brand Nikon uses for its image processors. It is a system on a chip used as the image processor in all Nikon DSLRs and MILCs since 2007, along with being used in some digital compact cameras.

=== Rise of the Nikon F series ===
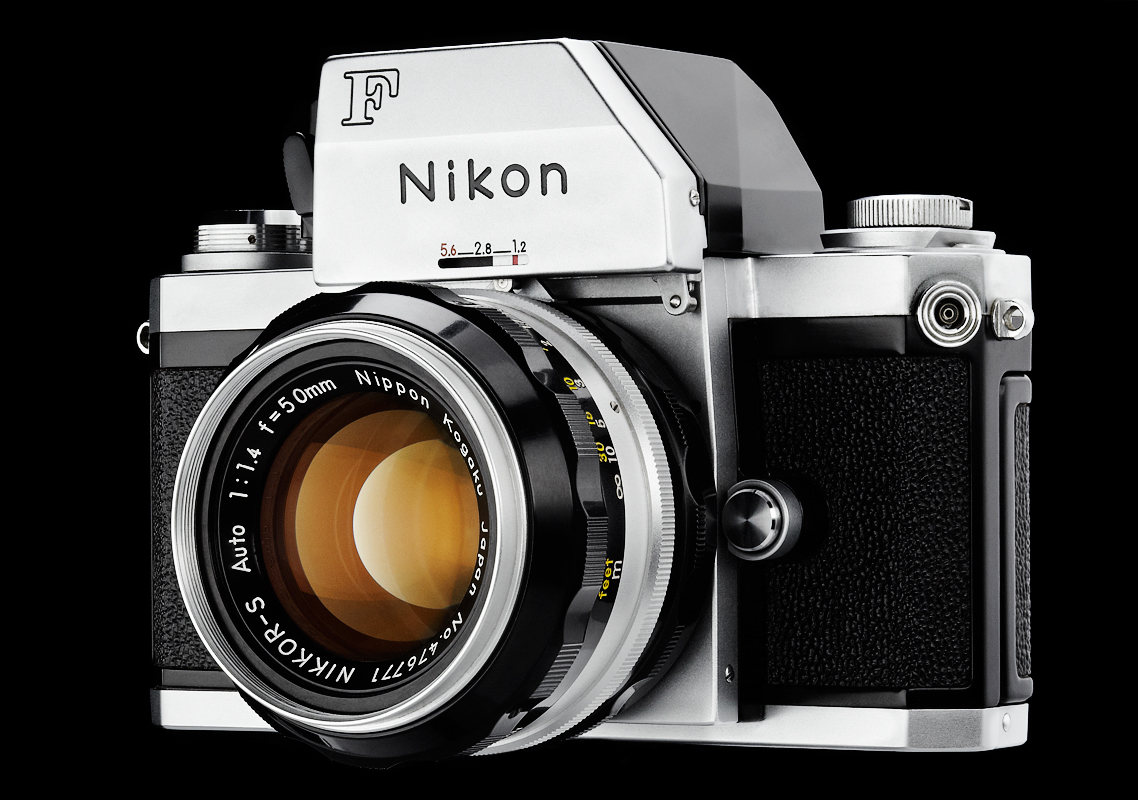
Nikon F FTN Camera

Nikon's rangefinder cameras, starting with the Nikon I in 1948, marked the entry of Nippon Kogaku K.K. into the photographic market, following its focus on optical instruments such as lenses and microscopes. These models, including the Nikon I, M, S, and subsequent series, utilized the S-Mount bayonet, inspired by the Contax RF system, and featured a compact design with a rangefinder viewfinder. They helped establish Nikon as a leading brand in professional photography until the shift to reflex cameras in the 1960s.

The Nikon SP and other 1950s and 1960s rangefinder cameras competed directly with models from Leica and Zeiss. However, the company quickly ceased developing its rangefinder line to focus its efforts on the Nikon F single-lens reflex line of cameras, which was successful upon its introduction in 1959.

For nearly 30 years, Nikon's F-series SLRs were the most widely used small-format cameras among professional photographers, as well as by some U.S. space programs, the first in 1971 on Apollo 15 (as a lighter and smaller alternative to the Hasselblad, used in the Mercury, Gemini and Apollo programs, 12 of which are still on the Moon) and later once in 1973 on the Skylab and later again on it in 1981.

Nikon popularized many features in professional SLR photography, such as the modular camera system with interchangeable lenses, viewfinders, motor drives, and data backs; integrated light metering and lens indexing; electronic strobe flashguns instead of expendable flashbulbs; electronic shutter control; evaluative multi-zone "matrix" metering; and built-in motorized film advance. However, as autofocus SLRs became available from Minolta and others in the mid-1980s, Nikon's line of manual-focus cameras began to seem out of date.

Despite introducing one of the first autofocus models, the slow and bulky F3AF, the company's determination to maintain lens compatibility with its F-mount prevented rapid advances in autofocus technology. Canon introduced a new type of lens-camera interface with its entirely electronic Canon EOS cameras and Canon EF lens mount in 1987.

The much faster lens performance permitted by Canon's electronic focusing and aperture control prompted many professional photographers (especially in sports and news) to switch to the Canon system through the 1990s.

==== Post-millennium film camera production ====
Once Nikon introduced affordable consumer-level DSLRs such as the Nikon D70 in the mid-2000s, sales of its consumer and professional film cameras fell rapidly, following the general trend in the industry. In January 2006, Nikon announced it would stop making most of its film camera models and all of its large format lenses, and focus on digital models.

Nikon continued to offer the high-end Nikon F6 and the entry-level FM10 after the 2006 restructuring. Both models still appeared in Nikon's film-camera lineup in 2019.

=== Digital photography ===
==== Digital single-lens reflex and point and shoot cameras ====
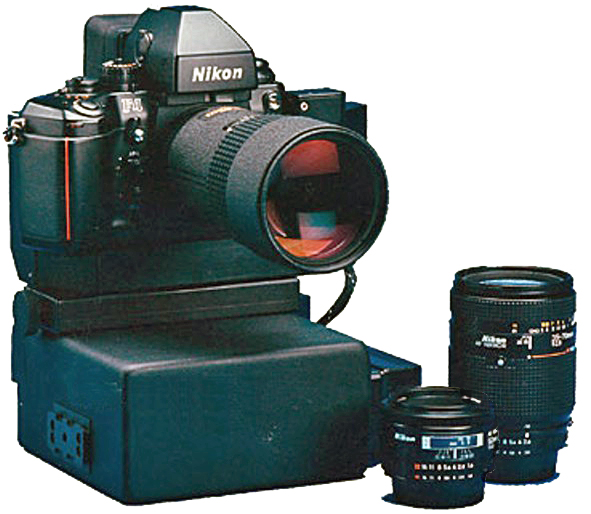
Nikon NASA F4 front view with DA-20 action finder, electronics box, and lenses. Launched September 1991 on board the Space Shuttle Discovery, mission STS-48

Nikon created some of the first digital SLRs (DSLRs) for NASA; the Nikon NASA F4 was used in the Space Shuttle since 1991. After a 1990s partnership with Kodak to produce digital SLR cameras based on existing Nikon film bodies, Nikon released the Nikon D1 SLR under its own name in 1999. Although it used an APS-C-size light sensor only 2/3 the size of a 35 mm film frame (later called a "DX sensor"), the D1 was among the first digital cameras to have sufficient image quality and a low enough price for some professionals (particularly photojournalists and sports photographers) to use it as a replacement for a film SLR. The company also has a Coolpix line which grew as consumer digital photography became increasingly prevalent through the early 2000s.

Through the mid-2000s, Nikon's line of professional and enthusiast DSLRs and lenses, including its backwards compatible AF-S lens line, remained in second place behind Canon in SLR camera sales, and Canon had several years' lead in producing professional DSLRs with light sensors as large as traditional 35 mm film frames. All Nikon DSLRs from 1999 to 2007, by contrast, used the smaller DX size sensor.

Then, 2005 management changes at Nikon led to new camera designs such as the full-frame Nikon D3 in late 2007, the Nikon D700 a few months later, and mid-range SLRs. Nikon regained much of its reputation among professional and amateur enthusiast photographers as a leading innovator in the field, especially because of the speed, ergonomics, and low-light performance of its latest models. The mid-range Nikon D90, introduced in 2008, was the first SLR camera to record video. Since the D90, video mode has been introduced to many more of the Nikon and non-Nikon DSLR cameras, including the Nikon D3S, Nikon D3100, Nikon D3200, Nikon D5100, and Nikon D7000.

In 2008, Nikon released a photograph and video editing suite called ViewNX to browse, edit, merge and share images and videos. Despite the market growth of mirrorless cameras, Nikon did not neglect its F-mount SLR cameras and continued to release some professional DSLRs, such as the D780 and the D6 in 2020.

==== Mirrorless interchangeable-lens cameras ====
logo of a Nikon international ad campaign, "I AM Nikon"

In reaction to the growing market for mirrorless cameras, Nikon released its first Mirrorless Interchangeable Lens Cameras and also a new lens mount in 2011. The lens mount was the Nikon 1, and the first bodies for it were the Nikon 1 J1 and the V1. The system was built around a 1-inch (CX format) image sensor with a 2.7× crop factor. In 2018, Nikon officially discontinued the 1 series, after three years without a new camera body, the last one being the Nikon 1 J5.

Immediately following the demise of the Nikon 1, Nikon introduced a new mirrorless system in its lineup: the Nikon Z system. The first cameras in the series were the Z6 and the Z7, both with a Full Frame (FX) sensor format, In-Body Image Stabilization and a built-in electronic viewfinder. The Z-mount is not only for FX cameras though, as in 2019 Nikon introduced the Z50 with a DX format sensor, without IBIS but with the compatibility to every Z-mount lens.

In 2020, Nikon updated both the Z6 and the Z7 with the Z6II and the Z7II. The improvements over the original models include the use of dual EXPEED 6 processors, an added card slot, improved video and AF features, higher burst rates, battery grip support, and USB-C power delivery.

In 2021, Nikon released two mirrorless cameras, the Zfc and the Z9. The Nikon Zfc is the second Z-series APS-C (DX) mirrorless camera in the lineup, designed to evoke the company's famous FM2 SLR from the 1980s. It offers manual controls, including dedicated dials for shutter speed, exposure compensation and ISO. The Z9 became Nikon's flagship mirrorless camera, succeeding the D6 at the top of the company's professional camera range. It uses a 45.7-megapixel Full Frame (FX) format stacked CMOS sensor and omits a mechanical shutter. Its specifications include 20 fps continuous shooting at full resolution in raw format, 30 fps continuous shooting for full-resolution JPEGs, 4K 120p video and 8K internal recording.

==== Mirrorless fixed-lens cameras, the cancelled release of DL series ====
Before the introduction of the Z-series, on February 23, 2016 Nikon announced its DL line of fixed-lens compact cameras. The series would have comprised three 20 megapixel 1"-type CMOS sensor cameras with Expeed 6A image processing engines: DL18-50 f/1.8-2.8, DL24-85 f/1.8-2.8 black and silver and DL24-500 f/2.8-5.6. Nikon described the range as a premium line of compact cameras, which combines the high performance of Nikkor lenses with always-on smart device connectivity. All three cameras were showcased at CP+ 2016. One year after the initial announcement, on February 13, 2017, Nikon officially cancelled the release and sale of the DL-series, which was originally planned for a June 2016 release. They cited design issues (with the integrated circuit for image processing) and profitability as main issues causing the cancellation.

=== Movie camera production ===
Although few models were introduced, Nikon made movie cameras as well. The R10 and R8 SUPER ZOOM Super 8 models (introduced in 1973) were the top of the line and last attempt for the amateur movie field. The cameras had a special gate and claw system to improve image steadiness and overcome a major drawback of Super 8 cartridge design. The R10 model has a high speed 10X macro zoom lens.

Contrary to other brands, Nikon never attempted to offer projectors or their accessories.

=== Thai operations ===
Nikon has shifted much of its manufacturing facilities to Thailand, with some production (especially of Coolpix cameras and some low-end lenses) in Indonesia. The company constructed a factory in Ayuthaya north of Bangkok in Thailand in 1991. By 2000, it had 2,000 employees. Steady growth over the next few years and an increase of floor space from the original 19,400 square meters (209,000 square feet) to 46,200 square meters (497,000 square feet) enabled the factory to produce a wider range of Nikon products. By 2004, it had more than 8,000 workers.

The range of the products produced at Nikon Thailand include plastic molding, optical parts, painting, printing, metal processing, plating, spherical lens process, aspherical lens process, prism process, electrical and electronic mounting process, silent wave motor and autofocus unit production.

By the early 2010s, Nikon's Thai facility produced DX-format DSLRs and models including the D600, while several professional and semi-professional FX-format cameras—including the D700, D3 series, D4, D800 and Df—were produced in Sendai, Japan. The Thai facility also produced many DX zoom lenses and other lenses in the Nikkor line.

=== Nikon-Essilor Co. Ltd. ===
In 1999, Nikon and Essilor signed a memorandum of understanding to form a global strategic alliance in corrective lenses by forming a 50/50 joint venture in Japan to be called Nikon-Essilor Co. Ltd.

The main purpose of the joint venture was to strengthen the corrective lens business of both companies by integrating Nikon's brand and optical technology and sales network in the Japanese market with the global marketing and sales network of Essilor.

Nikon-Essilor Co. Ltd. started its business in January 2000, responsible for research, development, production and sales mainly for ophthalmic optics.

In October 2024, EssilorLuxottica disclosed a 5.1% stake in Nikon, deepening the relationship between the two companies.

In October 2025, EssilorLuxottica became Nikon's largest shareholder after its voting-rights ratio reached 10.75%. Nikon also stated that EssilorLuxottica had obtained regulatory clearance to increase its holding to up to 20%. As of March 31, 2026, Nikon's shareholder register listed "SG/ESSILOR LUXOTTICA" as the largest shareholder, with 18.53% of outstanding shares.

=== Recent developments ===
Beginning in the early 2010s, Nikon faced a contraction in the market for interchangeable-lens cameras. In 2013, the company forecast its first decline in interchangeable-lens camera sales since the introduction of the Nikon D1 in 1999.

In March 2014, the annual consumer-rights program "3.15" on China Central Television criticized Nikon over black specks appearing in photographs taken with some D600 cameras and the company's handling of customer complaints. Nikon said it would improve its after-sales service in China; Chinese authorities subsequently ordered sales of the D600 to stop on the mainland, and Nikon withdrew the model from sale there and offered free repairs.

Revenue from Nikon's camera business fell 30% in the three years prior to fiscal 2015, and in 2016 the company announced a restructuring that included the reassignment of more than 1,500 employees and a workforce reduction of about 1,000, mainly in its camera and semiconductor lithography businesses.

The restructuring was followed by a substantial recovery in profitability. For the fiscal year ended March 31, 2018, Nikon's operating profit increased to ¥56.2 billion from ¥0.8 billion in the previous year, largely reflecting lower restructuring costs. Operating profit in the Imaging Products business rose 76.2% to ¥30.2 billion as restructuring improved profitability and sales of the D850 were strong. Precision Equipment operating profit rose 296.6% to ¥53.4 billion, and Nikon reported that its Semiconductor Lithography Business had achieved break-even as planned.

At the same time, Nikon expanded into new business areas and reorganized its imaging business. In 2015, Optos plc became a wholly owned subsidiary of Nikon, adding retinal imaging to the company's healthcare operations. In August 2018, Nikon introduced the Z-mount system and announced the Z 7 and Z 6, its first full-frame mirrorless cameras. In September 2023, Nikon completed the acquisition of SLM Solutions, which became Nikon SLM Solutions AG, expanding the company's metal additive-manufacturing operations. In April 2024, Nikon completed its acquisition of Red Digital Cinema, extending its imaging business into professional digital cinema cameras.

On July 29, 2024, Nikon began operations at its relocated headquarters in Nishi-Ōi, Shinagawa, Tokyo. In October 2025, EssilorLuxottica became Nikon's largest shareholder after its voting-rights ratio reached 10.75%. On April 1, 2026, Nikon introduced a new management structure, with Muneaki Tokunari becoming representative director and chairman and Yasuhiro Ohmura becoming representative director, president and CEO.

For the fiscal year ended March 31, 2026, Nikon recorded an operating loss of ¥112.4 billion and a loss attributable to owners of the parent of ¥86.1 billion. The result included ¥90.6 billion in impairment losses in the Digital Manufacturing business.

== Business operations ==
Nikon organizes its activities into five principal business domains: Imaging Products, Precision Equipment, Healthcare, Industry and Digital Manufacturing. For the fiscal year ended March 31, 2026, segment revenue was ¥290.053 billion for Imaging Products, ¥167.258 billion for Precision Equipment, ¥111.922 billion for Healthcare, ¥76.176 billion for Components, and ¥28.090 billion for Digital Manufacturing. An additional ¥3.664 billion was reported as Other. The Components business was renamed the Industry business from April 2026.

== Imaging Products ==
The Imaging Products business includes interchangeable-lens cameras, Nikkor lenses, compact cameras and related imaging products. Nikon's principal current interchangeable-lens system is the Z-mount mirrorless system. The acquisition of Red Digital Cinema in 2024 expanded the business into professional digital cinema cameras.

=== Film cameras ===
In January 2006, Nikon announced the discontinuation of all but two models of its film cameras, focusing its efforts on the digital camera market. It continued to offer the fully manual FM10 and the high-end F6 after the restructuring; both models still appeared in Nikon's film-camera lineup in 2019. Nikon has also committed to service all the film cameras for a period of ten years after production ceases.

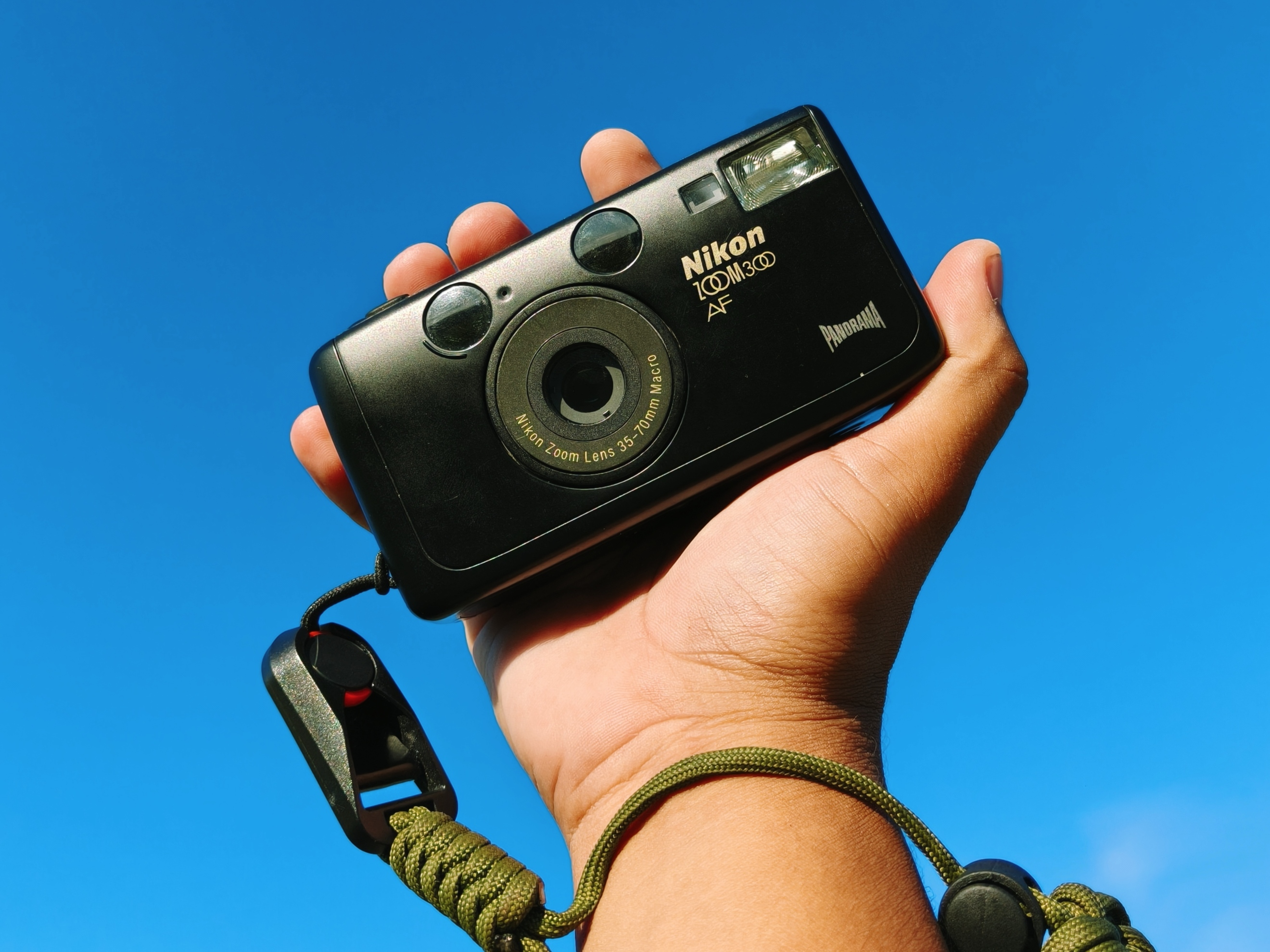
The Nikon Zoom 300 AF

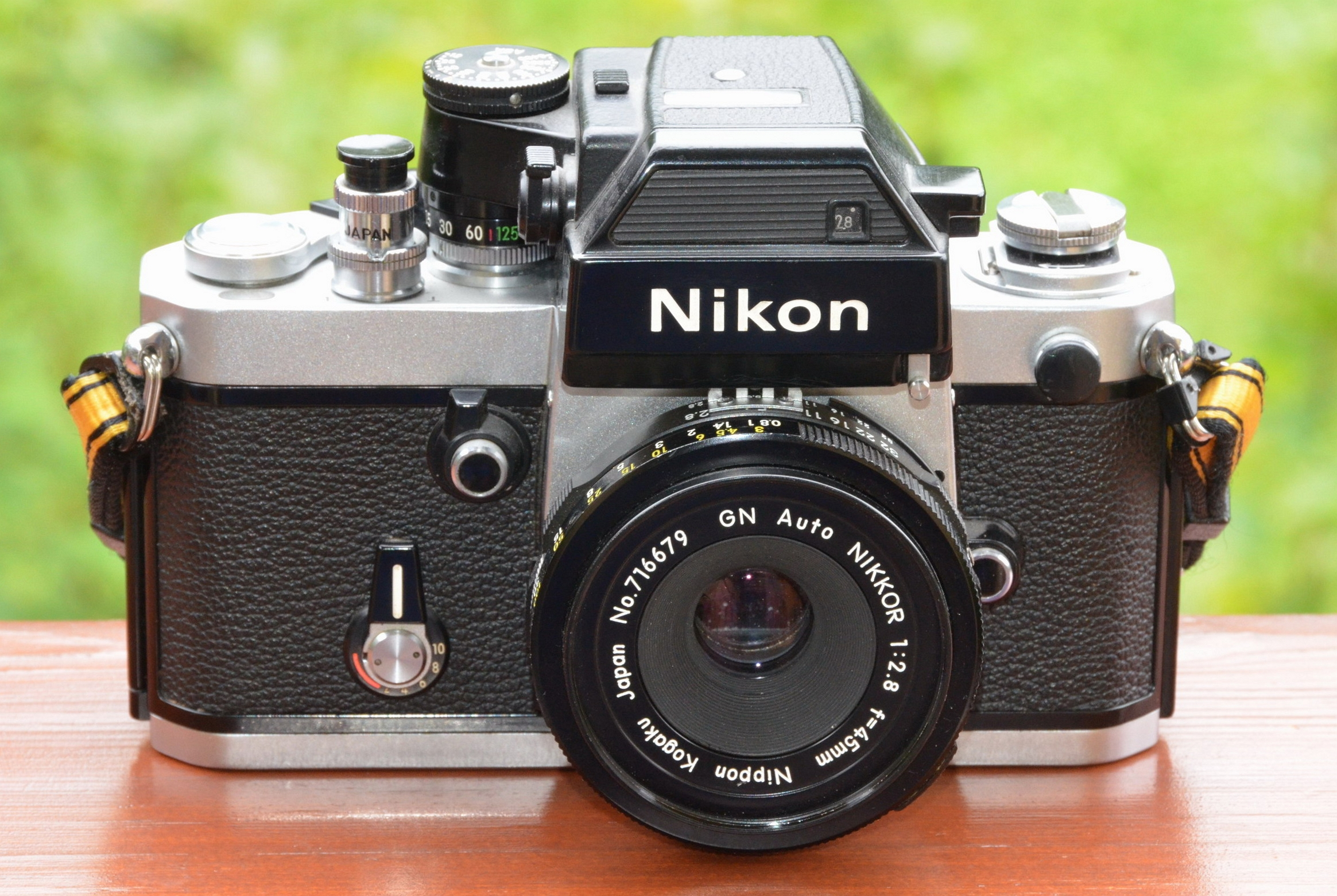
Nikon F2SB SLR camera with DP-3 finder and GN Auto Nikkor 1:2,8 f=45mm lens

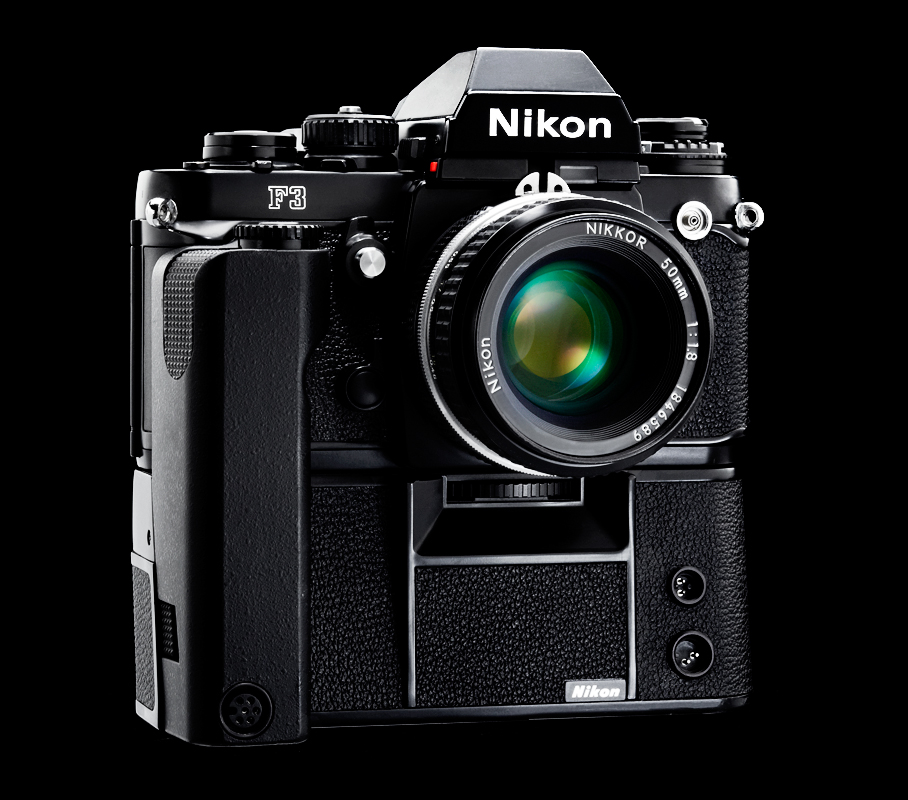
Nikon F3 Giugiaro Camera Design

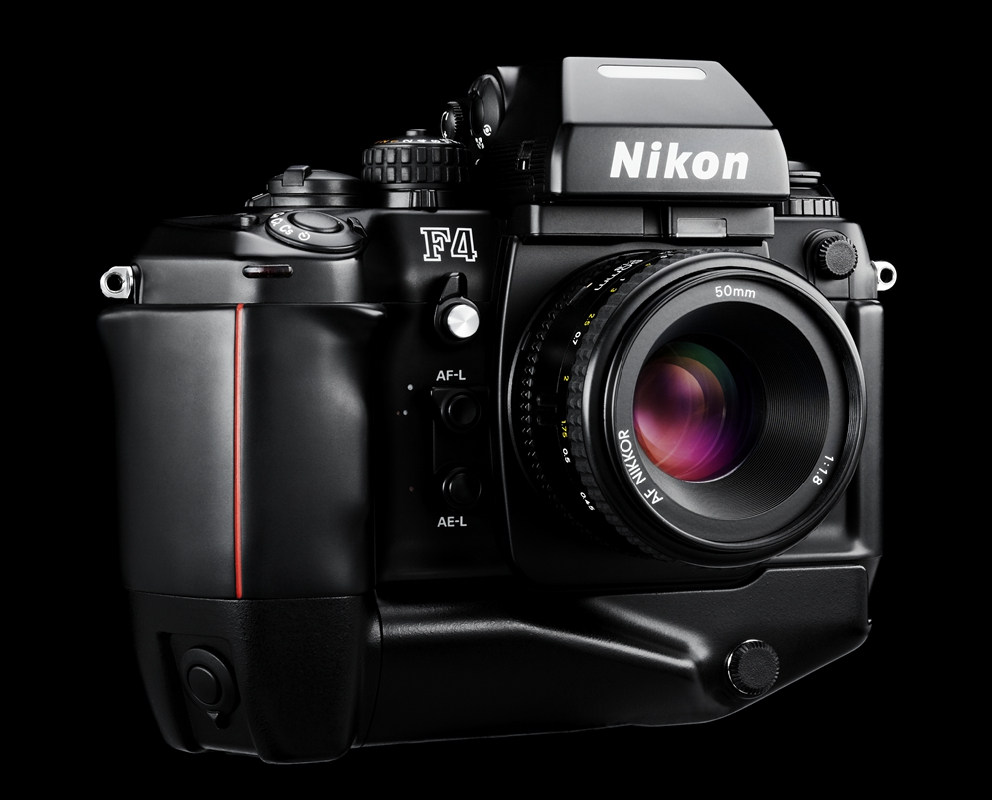
Nikon F4 F4s Giugiaro Design

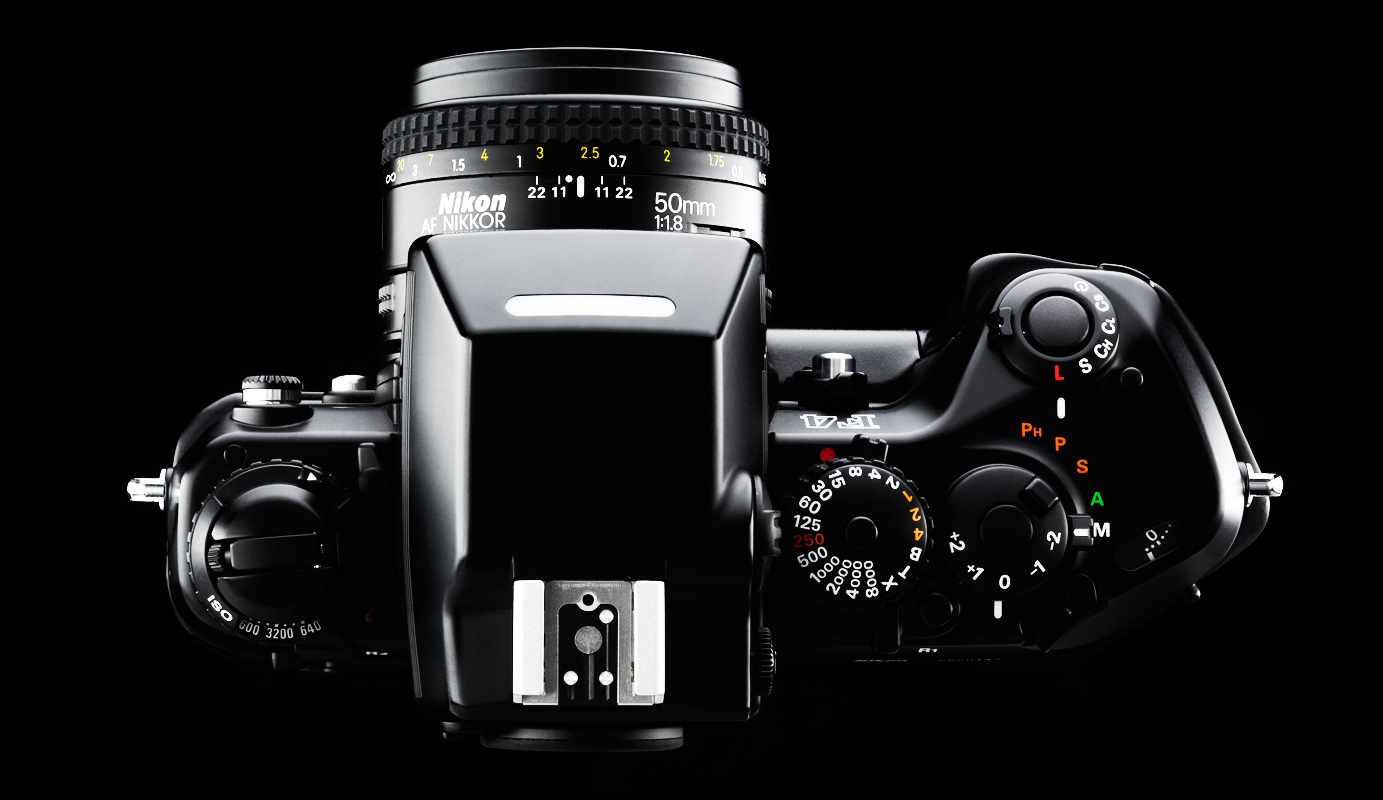
Nikon F4 Giugiaro Design

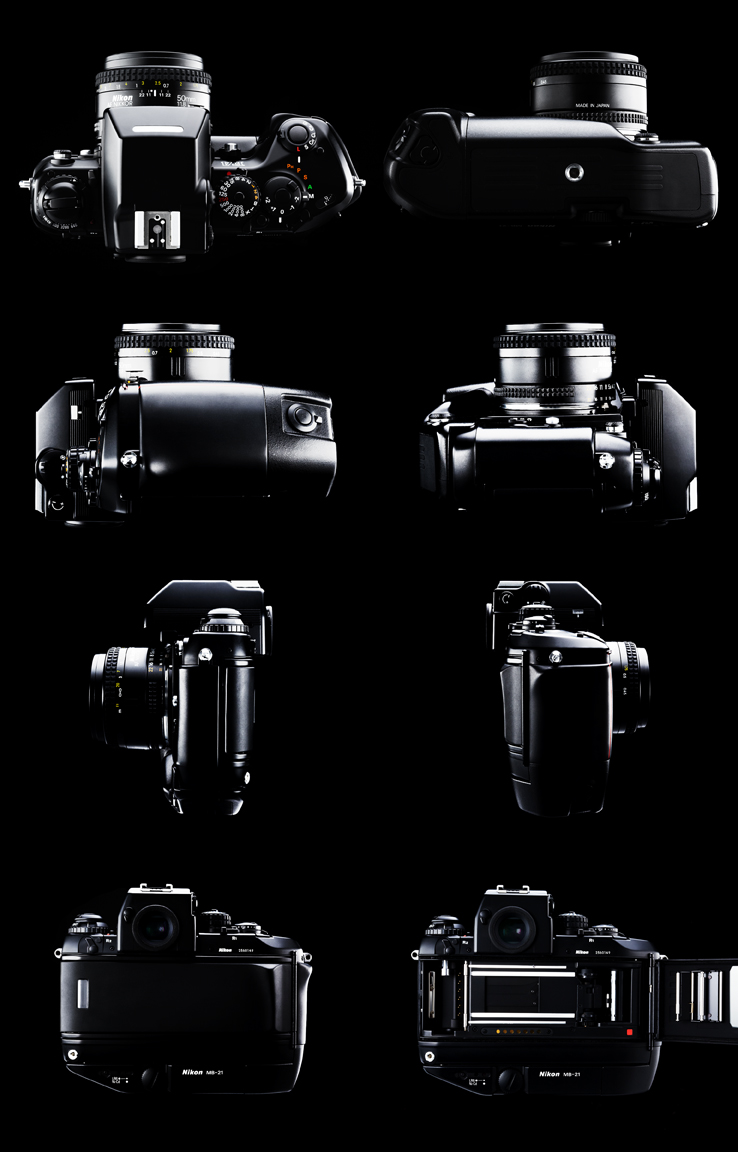
Nikon F4 F4s

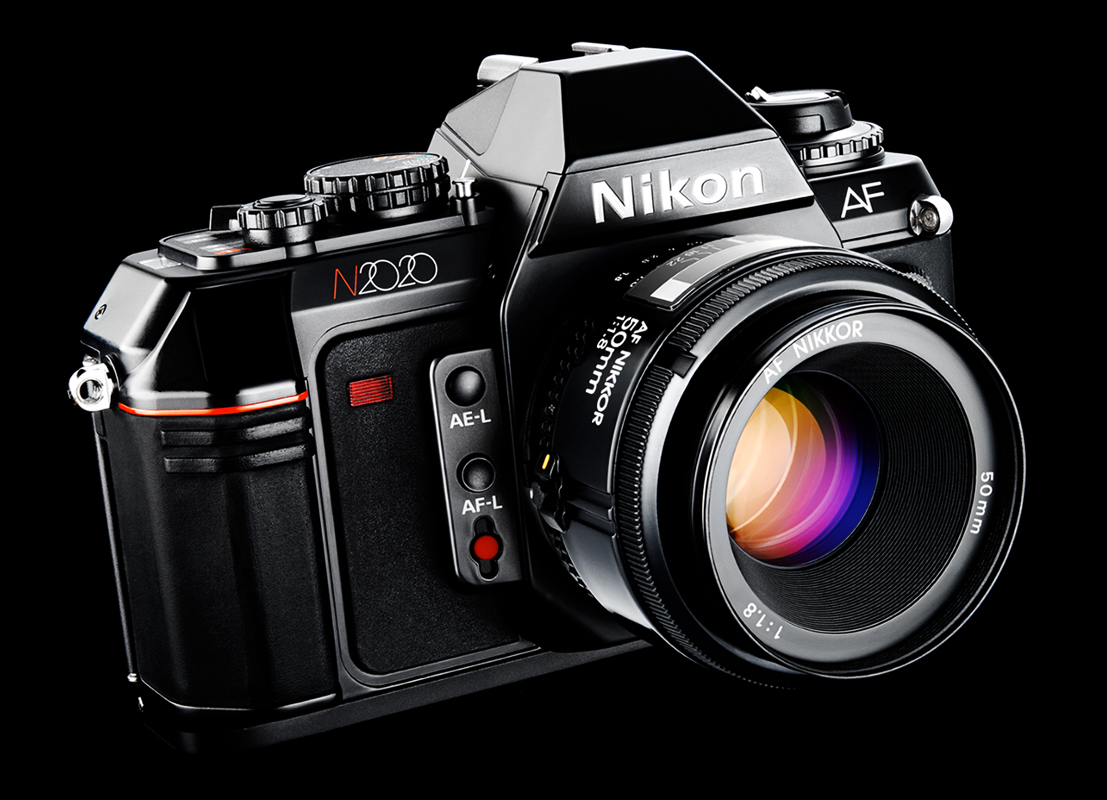
Nikon N2020

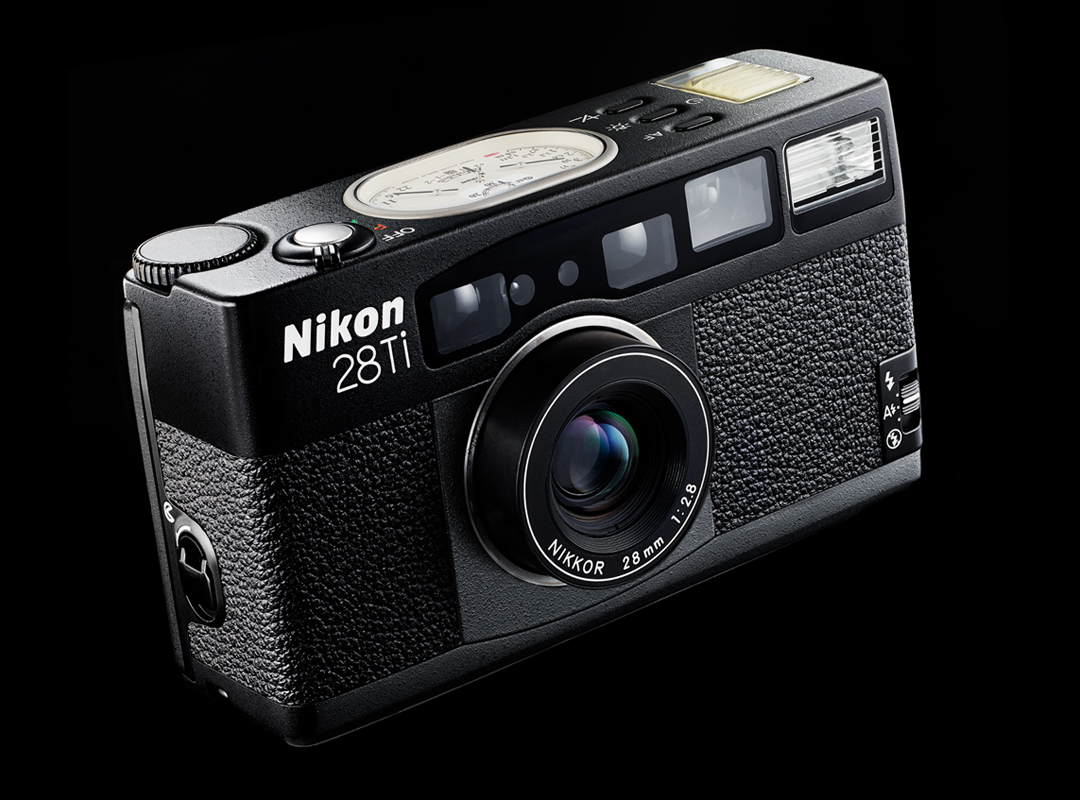
Nikon 28ti

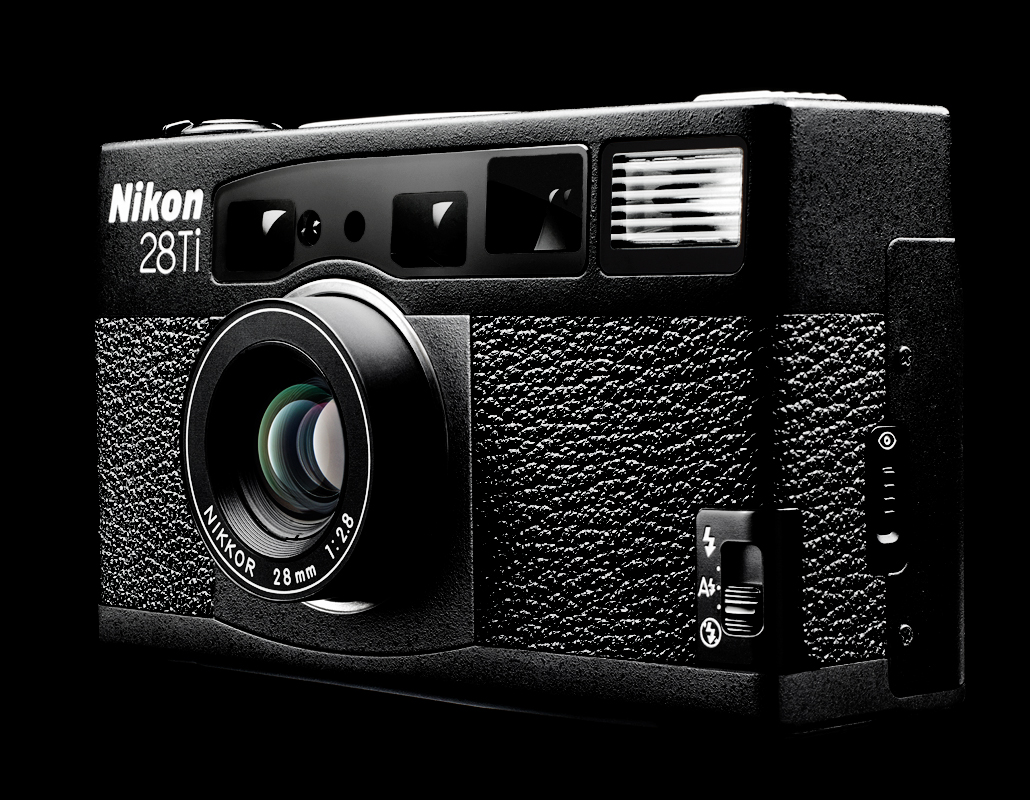
Nikon 28ti camera

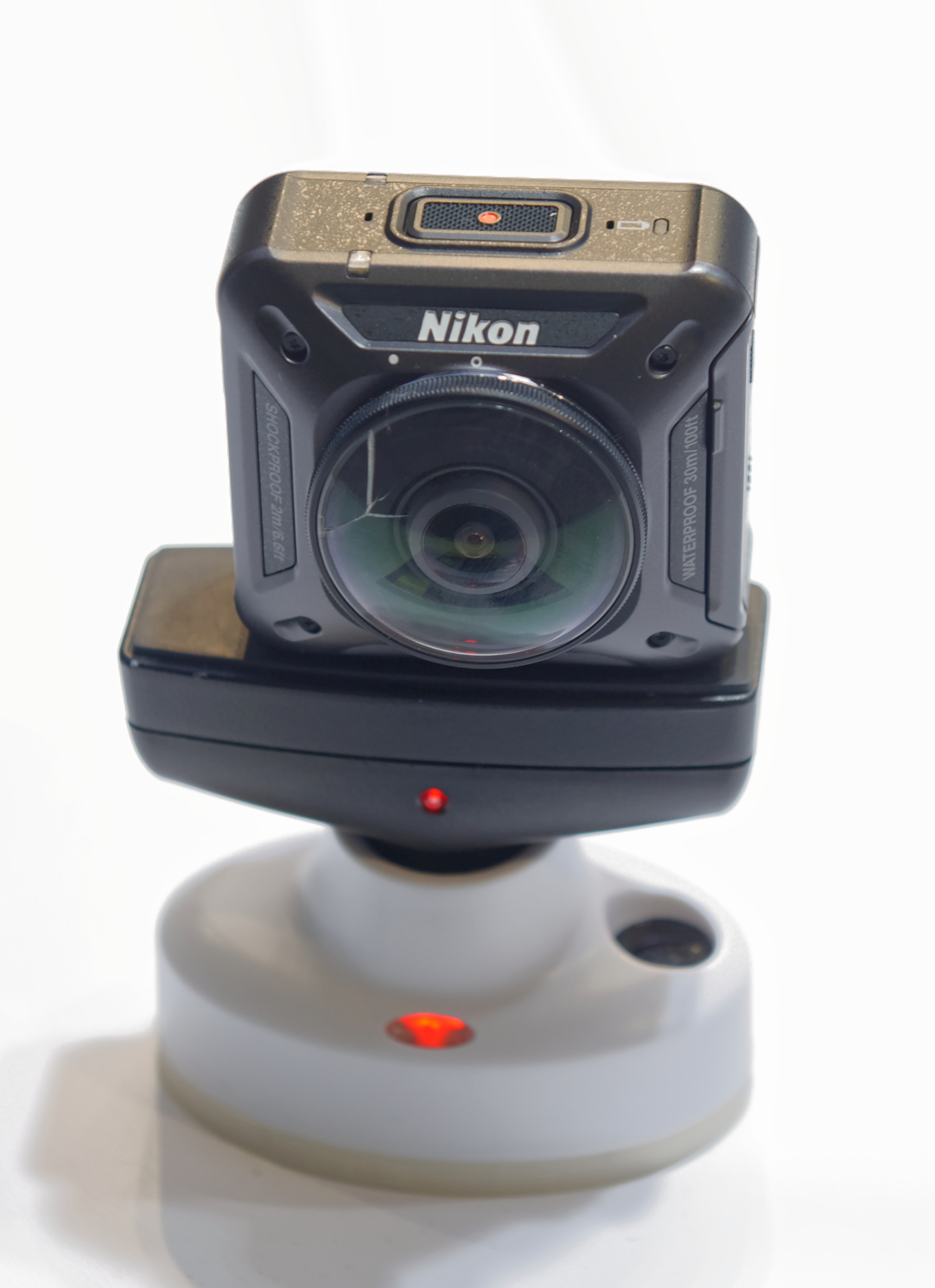
Nikon KeyMission 360

==== Film - Professional Rangefinder cameras ====
Nikon's rangefinder cameras, starting with the Nikon I in 1948, marked their entry into the photographic market. The following were the first film cameras introduced by Nikon. The latter three were built on the same frame with different features; the Nikon F SLR shares the basic body configuration of the latest rangefinder models.

- Nikon I (1948)
- Nikon M (1949)
- Nikon S (1951)
- Nikon S2 (1954)
- Nikon SP (1957)
- Nikon S3 (1958)
- Nikon S4 (1959) (entry-level)
- Nikon S3M (1960)

And later commemorative editions:

- Nikon S3 2000 (2000)
- Nikon SP Limited Edition (2005)

==== Film 35 mm SLR cameras with manual focus ====
===== High-end (Professional) =====
These models are intended for professional use, and are heavy-duty and weather resistant.

- Nikon F series (1959, known in Germany for legal reasons as the Nikkor F)
- Nikon F2 series (1971)
- Nikon F3 series (1980)

===== Midrange =====
- Nikkorex series (1960)
- Nikkormat F series (1965, known in Japan as the Nikomat F series)
- Nikon FM (1977)
- Nikon FM2 series (1982)
- Nikon FM10 (1995)

===== Midrange with electronic features =====
- Nikkormat EL series (1972, known in Japan as the Nikomat EL series)
- Nikon EL2 (1977)
- Nikon FE (1978)
- Nikon FE2 (1983)
- Nikon FA (1983)
- Nikon F-601M (1990, known in North America as the N6000)
- Nikon FE10 (1996)
- Nikon FM3A (2001)

===== Entry-level (Consumer) =====
- Nikon EM (1979)
- Nikon FG (1982)
- Nikon FG-20 (1984)
- Nikon F-301 (1985, known in North America as the N2000)

==== Film APS SLR cameras ====
- Nikon Pronea 600i / Pronea 6i (1996)
- Nikon Pronea S (1997)
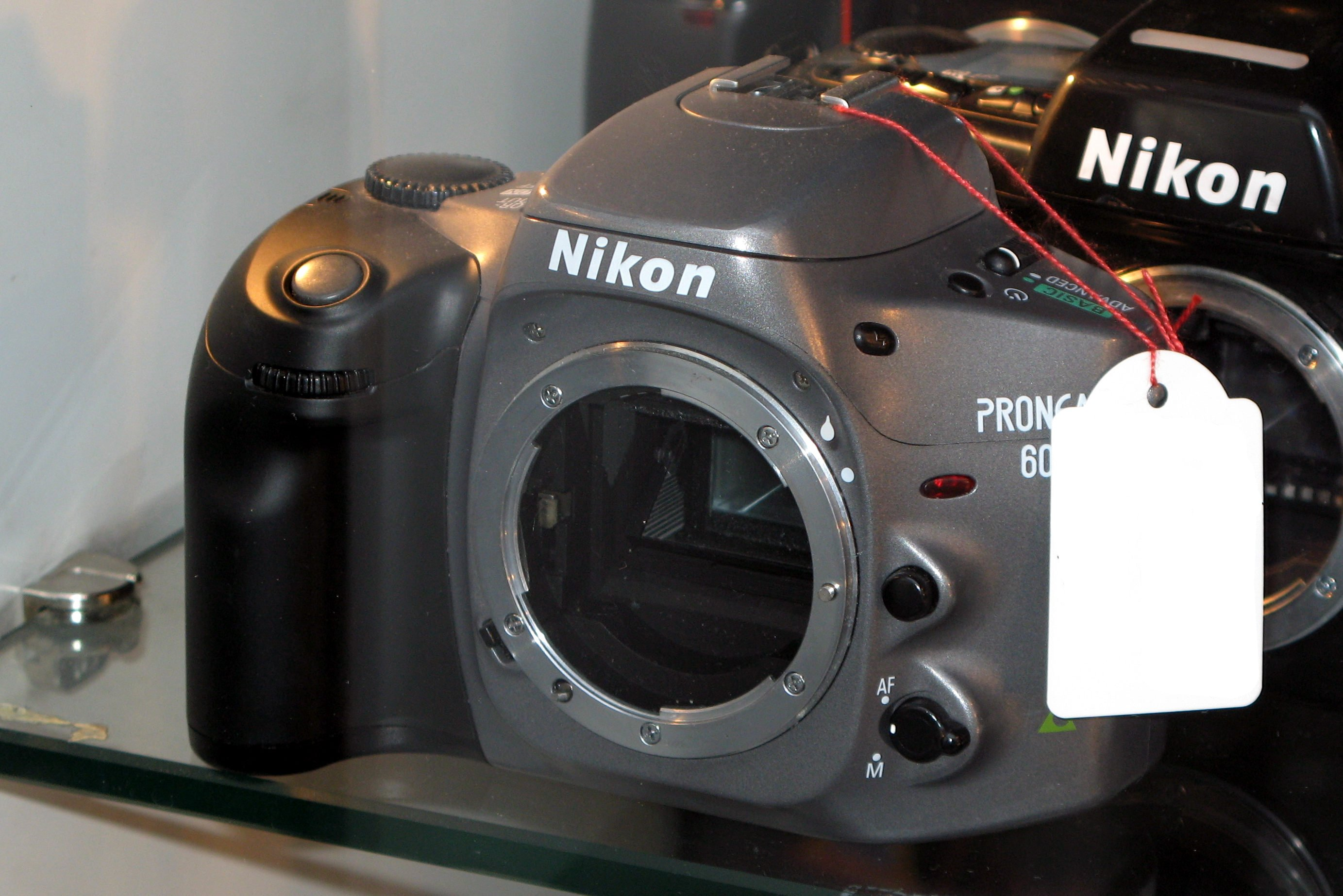
Nikon Pronea 600i

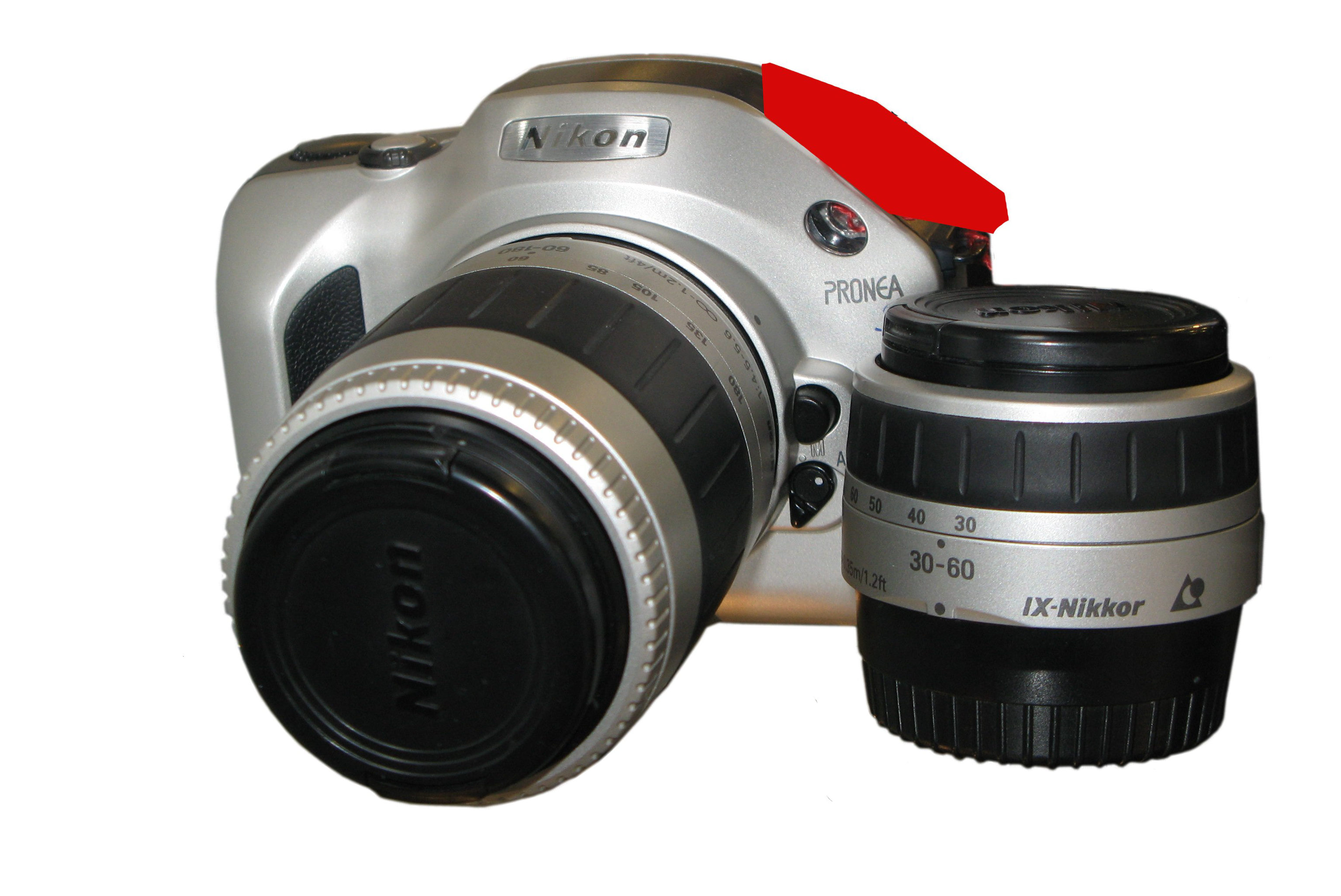
Nikon Pronea S

==== Film 35 mm SLR cameras with autofocus ====
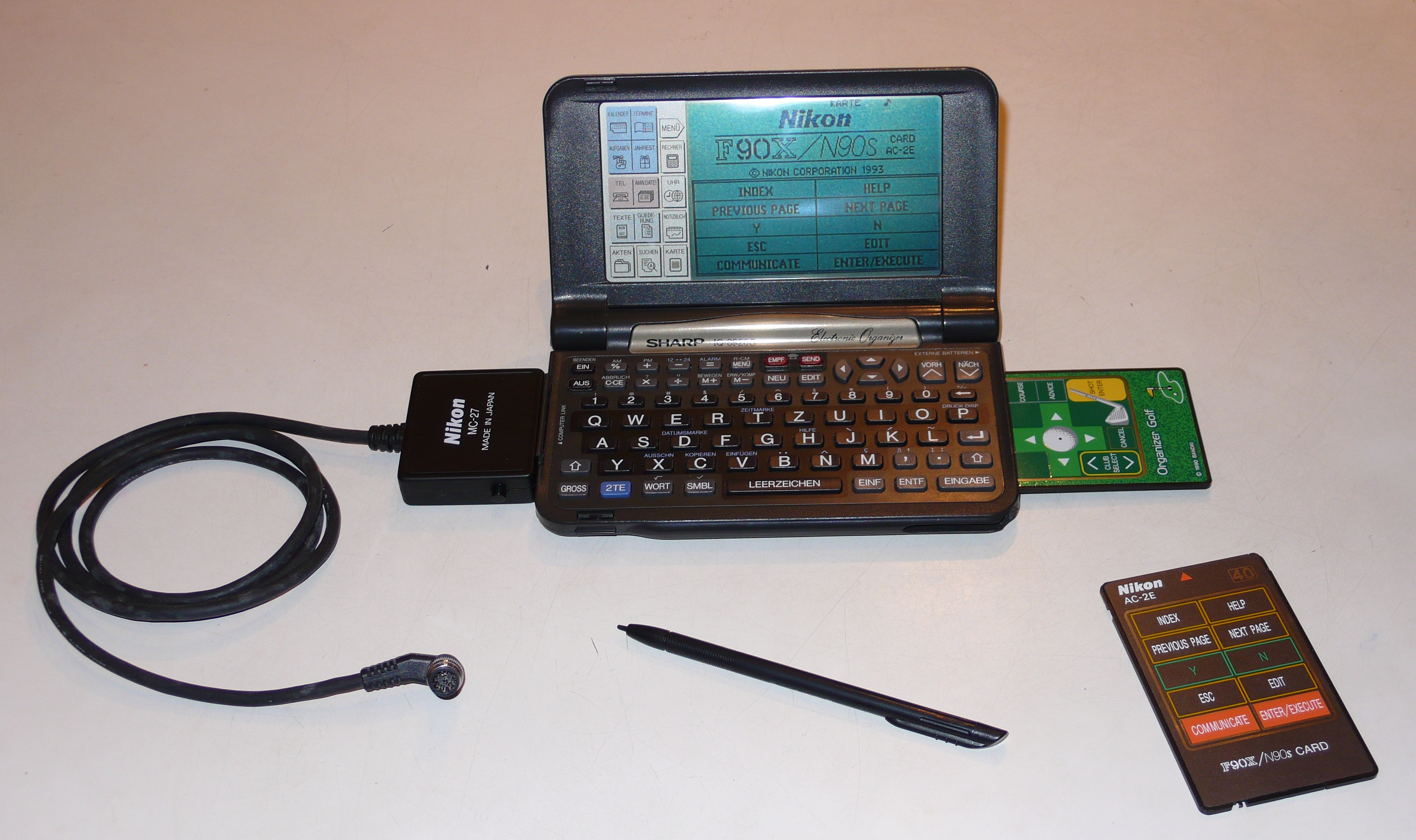
Nikon AC-2E Data Link System (1993)

===== High-end (Professional) =====
Intended for heavy-duty professional use and feature weather resistance.

- Nikon F3AF (1983, modified F3 body with Autofocus Finder DX-1)
- Nikon F4 (1988) – (World's first professional auto-focus SLR camera and world's first professional SLR camera with a built-in motor drive)
- Nikonos RS (1992) (Professional when reviewed in underwater conditions) – (World's first underwater auto-focus SLR camera)
- Nikon F5 (1996)
- Nikon F6 (2004)

===== High-end (Prosumer) =====
Intended for pro-consumers who want the main mechanic/electronic features of the professional line but don't need the same heavy duty/weather resistance.

- Nikon F-501 (1986, known in North America as the N2020)
- Nikon F-801 (1988, known in the U.S. as the N8008)
- Nikon F-801S (1991, known in the U.S. as the N8008S)
- Nikon F90 (1992, known in the U.S. as the N90)
- Nikon F90X (1994, known in the U.S. as the N90S)
- Nikon F80 (2000, known in the U.S. as the N80)
- Nikon F100 (1999)

===== Mid-range (Consumer) =====
- Nikon F-601 (1990, known in the U.S. as the N6006)
- Nikon F70 (1994, known in the U.S. as the N70)
- Nikon F75 (2003, known in the U.S. as the N75)

===== Entry-level (Consumer) =====
- Nikon F-401 (1987, known in the U.S. as the N4004)
- Nikon F-401S (1989, known in the U.S. as the N4004S)
- Nikon F-401X (1991, known in the U.S. as the N5005)
- Nikon F50 (1994, known in the U.S. as the N50)
- Nikon F60 (1999, known in the U.S. as the N60)
- Nikon F65 (2000, known in the U.S. as the N65)
- Nikon F55 (2002, known in the U.S. as the N55)

==== Compact cameras ====
Between 1983 and the early 2000s a broad range of compact cameras were made by Nikon. Nikon first started by naming the cameras with a series name (like the L35/L135-series, the RF/RD-series, the W35-series, the EF or the AW-series). In later production cycles, the cameras were double-branded, with both a series-name and a sales name. Sales names were for example Zoom-Touch for cameras with a wide zoom range, Lite-Touch for ultra compact models, Fun-Touch for easy to use cameras and Sport-Touch for splash water resistance. After the late 1990s, Nikon dropped the series names and continued only with the sales name. Nikon's APS-cameras were all named Nuvis.

In 1994, Nikon produced the first camera featuring optical vibration reduction, the Nikon Zoom 700VR/700VR QD, also released in some markets as the Nikon Zoom-Touch 105 VR). It was a 35mm compact film camera with a 38-105mm f/4-7.8 zoom lens, with a quartz data back variant. It was the world's first compact with Vibration Reduction.

The cameras came in all price ranges from entry-level fixed-lens-cameras to the top models Nikon 35Ti and 28Ti with titanium body and 3D-Matrix-Metering.

==== Movie cameras ====
Double 8 (8mm)
- NIKKOREX 8 (1960)
- NIKKOREX 8F (1963)
Super 8
- Nikon Super Zoom 8 (1966)
- Nikon 8X Super Zoom (1967)
- Nikon R8 Super Zoom (1973)
- Nikon R10 Super Zoom (1973)

==== Professional underwater cameras ====
- Nikonos I Calypso (1963, originally known in France as the Calypso/Nikkor)
- Nikonos II (1968)
- Nikonos III (1975)
- Nikonos IV-A (1980)
- Nikonos V (1984)
- Nikonos RS (1992) (World's first underwater autofocus SLR camera)

=== Digital cameras ===
==== Filmless, although not digital ====
The Nikon QV-1000C was the first filmless camera manufactured by Nikon. It was announced on August 26, 1988. It stored analog black and white images (NTSC) on a magnetic two-inch video floppy disk.

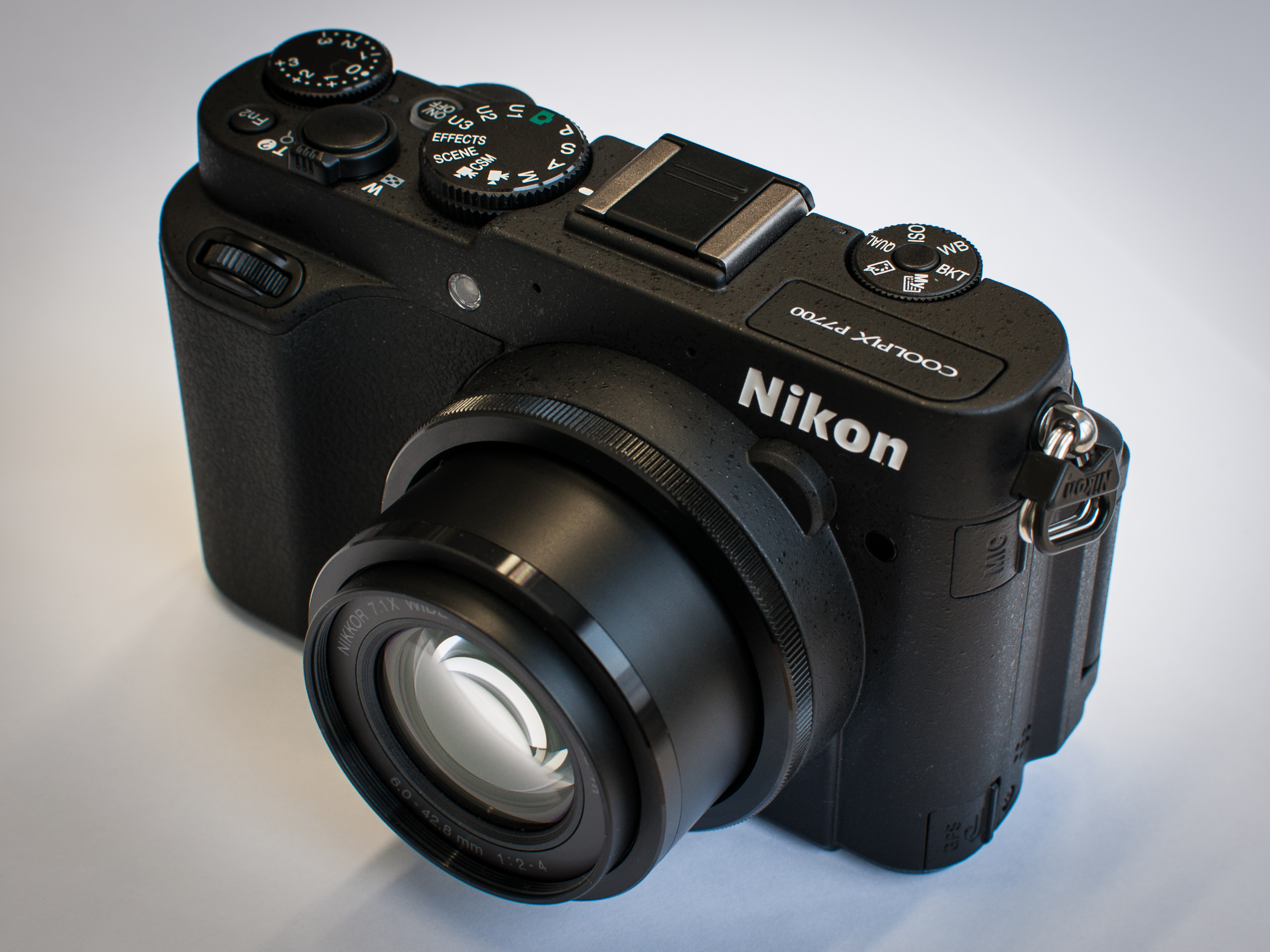
Nikon COOLPIX P7700

==== Digital compact cameras ====
The Nikon Coolpix series are digital compact cameras produced in many variants: superzoom, bridge, travel-zoom, miniature compact and waterproof/rugged cameras. The top compact cameras are several "Performance" series indicated by a "P" at the start of the model number.

===== Larger sensor compact cameras =====
Coolpix series since 2008 listed.

- Nikon Coolpix P6000, 2008-08-07 (CCD, 14 megapixels, 4x zoom)
- Nikon Coolpix P7000, 2010-09-08 (CCD, 10.1 megapixels, 7x zoom)
- Nikon Coolpix P7100, 2011-08-24 (roughly same specifications as predecessor)
- Nikon Coolpix P7700
- Nikon Coolpix A, 2013-03-05 (16MP DX-CMOS sensor)
- Nikon Coolpix P7800

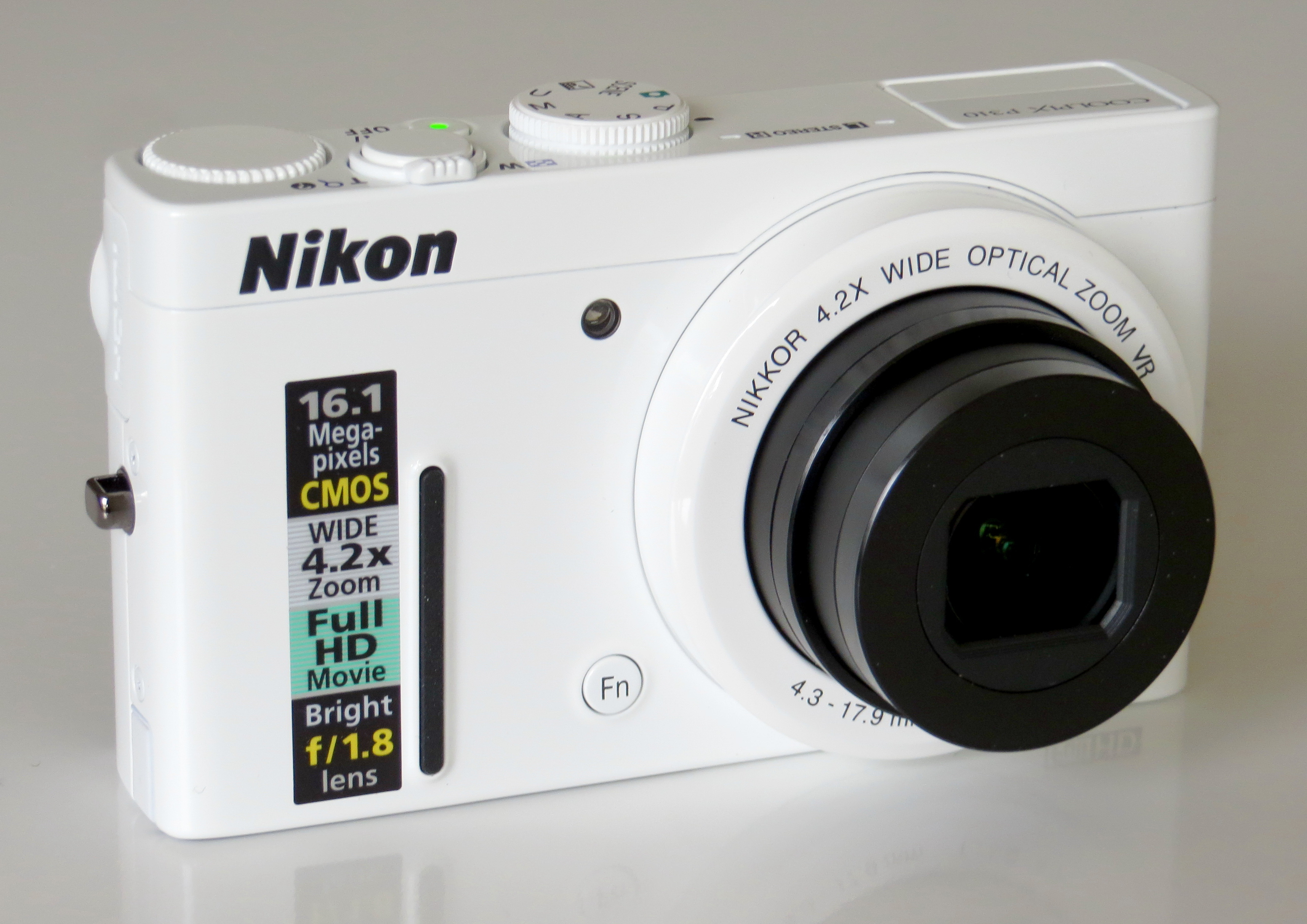
Nikon Coolpix P310 digital compact camera

====== Lightweight fast lens compact cameras ======
This is a set of fast lens compact cameras.

- Nikon Coolpix P300
- Nikon Coolpix P310
- Nikon Coolpix P330
- Nikon Coolpix P340
- Nikon Coolpix A900

===== Bridge cameras =====
Nikon produced the following set of bridge cameras:

- Nikon Coolpix L810, Feb, 2012–16 MP, 26x optical zoom, no wi-fi, fixed LCD, ISO 80–1600
- Nikon Coolpix L820, Jan, 2013–16 MP, 30x optical zoom, no wi-fi, fixed LCD, ISO 125-3200
- Nikon Coolpix L830, Jan, 2014–16 MP, 34x optical zoom with 68x Dynamic Fine Zoom, no wi-fi, tilting LCD, ISO 125-1600 (3200 in Auto)
- Nikon Coolpix L840 Feb, 2015–16 MP, 38x optical zoom with 76x Dynamic Fine Zoom, built-in Wi-Fi and NFC (Near Field Communication), 3 inch high-resolution tilting LCD, ISO 125 – 1600, ISO 3200, 6400 (available when using Auto mode)
- Nikon Coolpix P500, Feb, 2011–12.1 MP, 36x optical zoom, tilt LCD, ISO 160–3200
- Nikon Coolpix P510, Feb, 2012–16.1 MP, 41.7x optical zoom (24–1000mm), no wi-fi, vari-angle LCD, ISO 100–3200
- Nikon Coolpix P520, Jan, 2013–18.1 MP, 42x optical zoom, optional wi-fi, vari-angle LCD, ISO 80–3200
- Nikon Coolpix P530, Feb, 2014–16.1 MP, 42x optical zoom & 84x Dynamic Fine Zoom, opt wi-fi, fixed LCD, ISO 100–1600 (ISO 3200, 6400 in PASM mode)
- Nikon Coolpix P600, Feb, 2014–16.1 MP, 60x optical zoom and 120 Dynamic Fine Zoom, built in wi-fi, vari-angle LCD, ISO 100–1600 (ISO 3200, 6400 in PASM mode)
- Nikon Coolpix P610
- Nikon Coolpix B500, Feb, 2016-16 MP, 40x optical zoom, tilt LCD, ISO 160–6400
- Nikon Coolpix P900
- Nikon Coolpix P950
- Nikon Coolpix P1000
- Nikon Coolpix P1100

==== Mirrorless interchangeable-lens cameras ====
Nikon produced two lines of mirrorless interchangeable-lens cameras - the Z series and the 1 series.

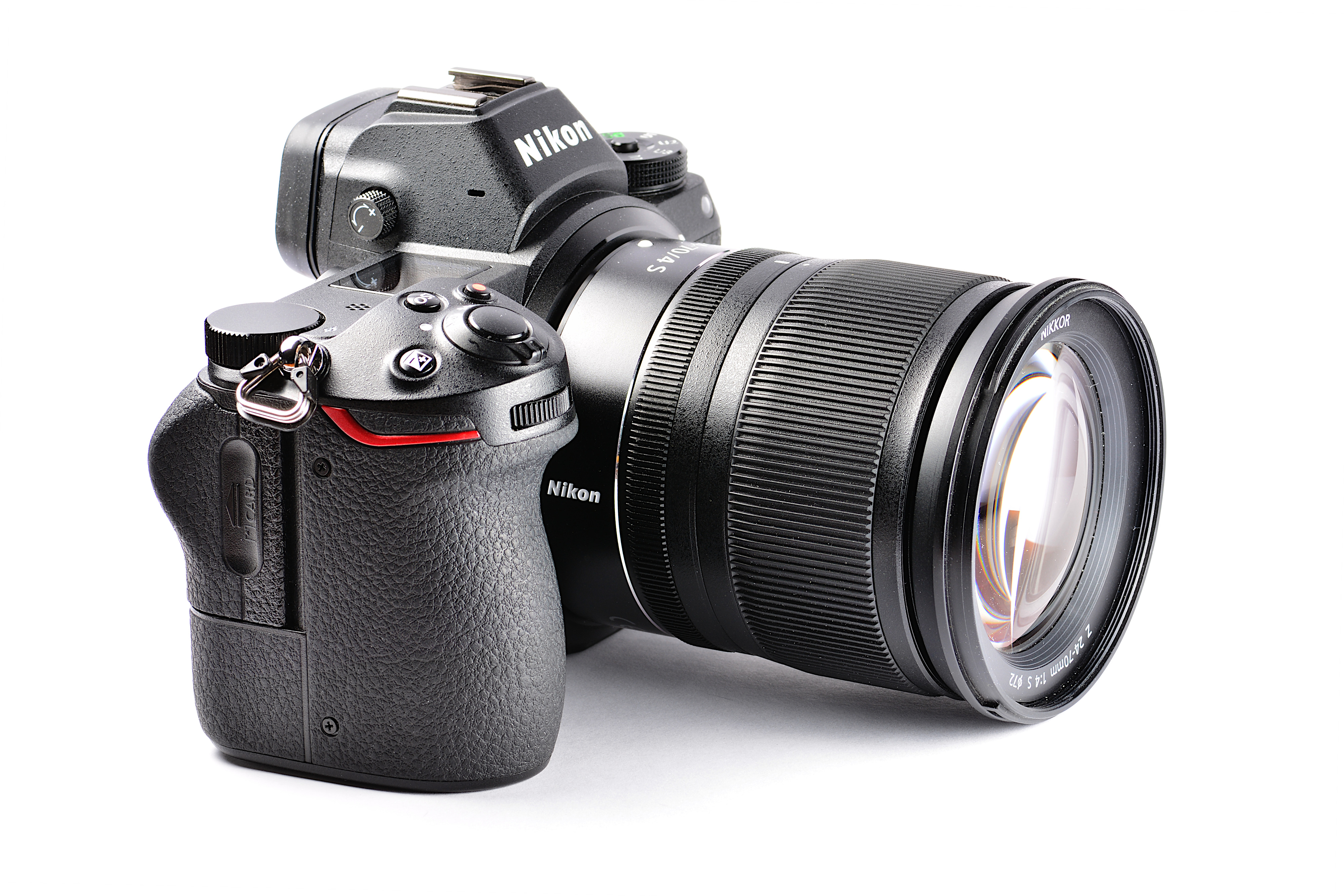
Nikon Z6 with a Nikkor Z 24-70/4S

===== Nikon Z series – FX and DX sensors, Nikon Z-mount lenses =====
Nikon Z7	FX/Full Frame	August 23, 2018
Nikon Z6	FX/Full Frame	August 23, 2018
Nikon Z50	DX/APS-C	October 10, 2019
Nikon Z5	FX/Full Frame	July 21, 2020
Nikon Z6II	FX/Full Frame	October 14, 2020
Nikon Z7II	FX/Full Frame	October 14, 2020
Nikon Zfc	DX/APS-C	July 23, 2021
Nikon Z9	FX/Full Frame	October 28, 2021
Nikon Z30	DX/APS-C	June 29, 2022
Nikon Z8	FX/Full Frame	May 10, 2023
Nikon Zf	FX/Full Frame	September 20, 2023
Nikon Z6III	FX/Full Frame	June 17, 2024
Nikon Z50II	DX/APS-C	November 7, 2024
Nikon Z5II	FX/Full Frame	April 3, 2025
Nikon ZR	FX/Full Frame	October 24, 2025	Cinema line
Nikon Z5IIC	FX/Full Frame	October 15, 2026

===== Nikon 1 series – CX sensor, Nikon 1 mount lenses =====
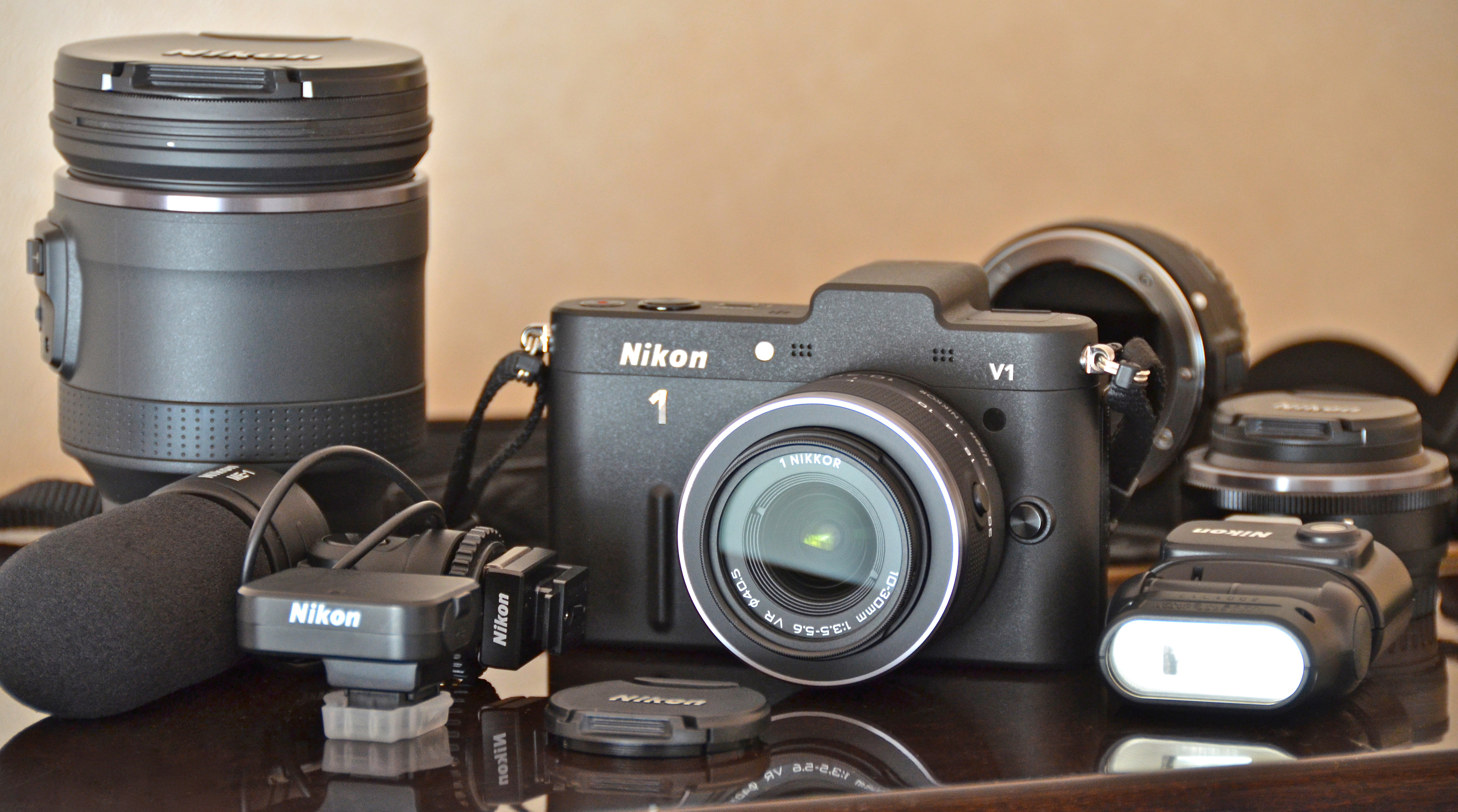
Nikon 1 V1 with lenses and flash SB-N5, GPS GP-N100 and microphone ME-1

- Nikon 1 J1, September 21, 2011, 10 MP
- Nikon 1 V1, September 21, 2011, 10 MP
- Nikon 1 J2, August 10, 2012, 10 MP
- Nikon 1 V2, October 24, 2012, 14 MP
- Nikon 1 J3, January 8, 2013, 14 MP
- Nikon 1 S1, January 8, 2013, 10 MP
- Nikon 1 AW1, September 19, 2013, 14 MP
- Nikon 1 V3, March 13, 2014, 18 MP, tilt LCD
- Nikon 1 J4, April 10, 2014, 18 MP
- Nikon 1 J5, April 2, 2015, 20 MP

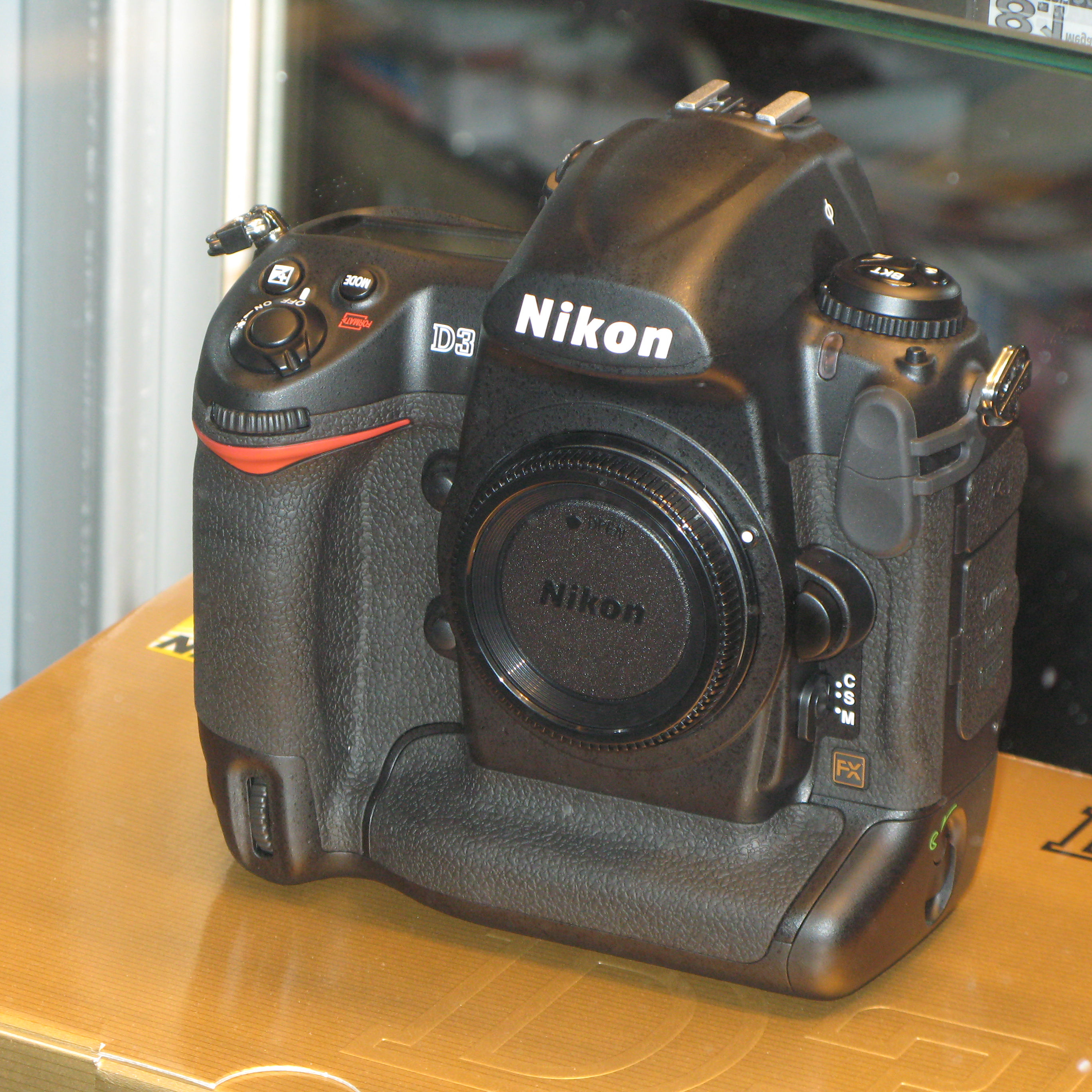
Nikon D3 full frame DSLR body

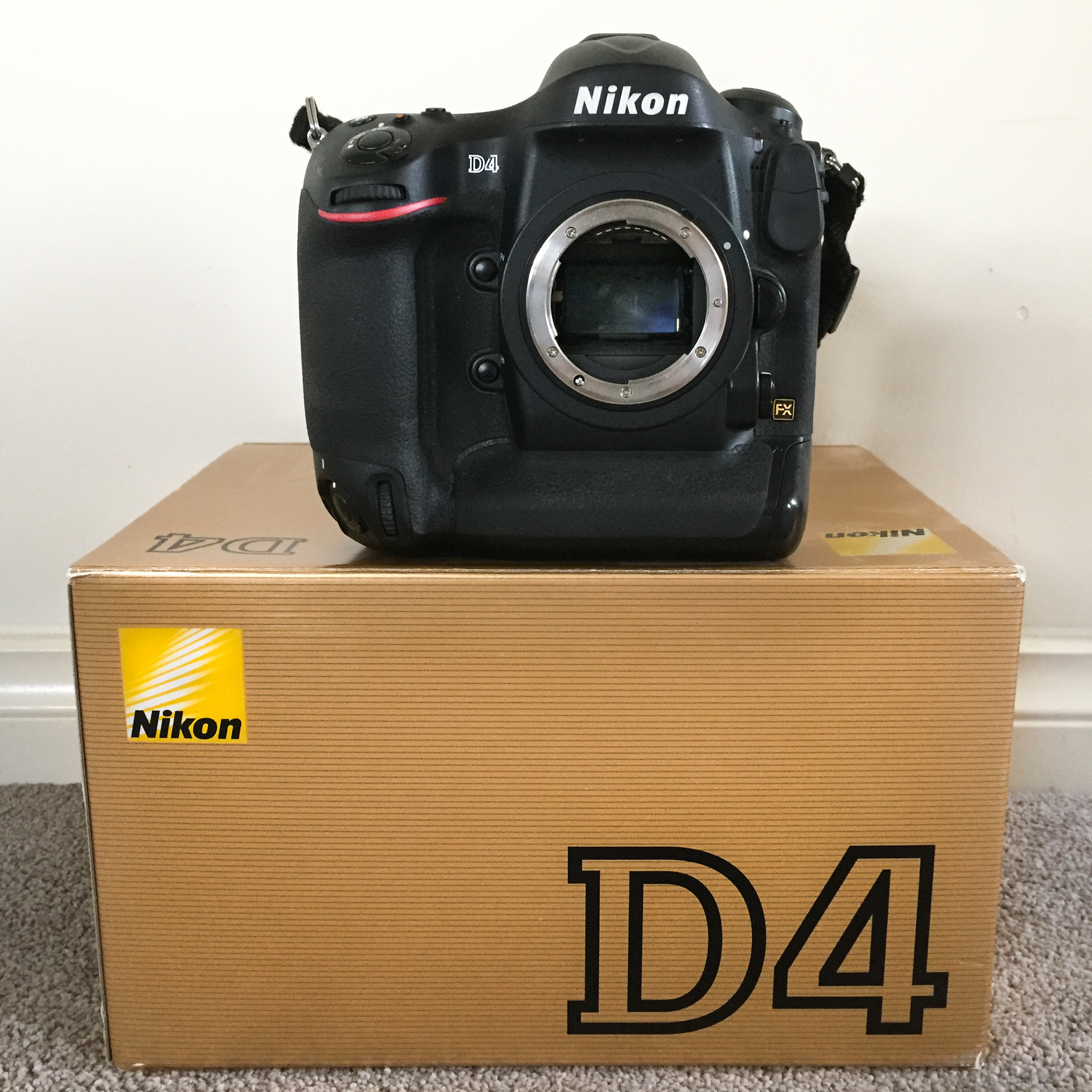
Nikon D4 full frame DSLR body

==== Digital single lens reflex cameras ====
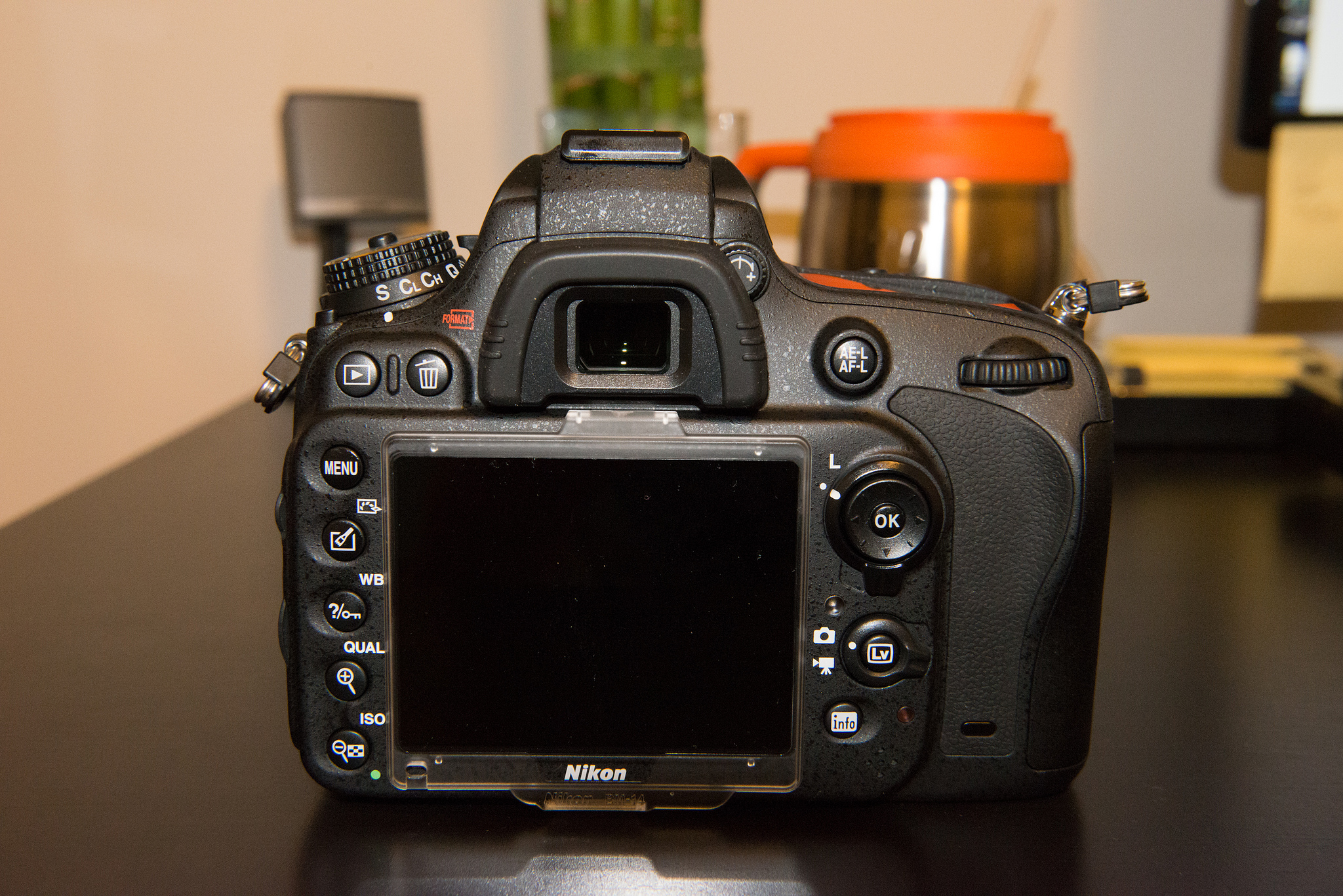
Nikon D600 body, back view

===== High-end (Professional) =====
Intended for heavy-duty professional use, featuring weather resistance.

- Nikon D1, DX sensor, June 15, 1999
- Nikon D1X, DX sensor, February 5, 2001
- Nikon D1H, DX sensor, high speed, February 5, 2001
- Nikon D2H, DX sensor, high speed, July 22, 2003
- Nikon D2X, DX sensor, September 16, 2004
- Nikon D2HS, DX sensor, high speed, February 16, 2005
- Nikon D2XS, DX sensor, June 1, 2006
- Nikon D3, FX/Full Frame sensor, August 23, 2007
- Nikon D3X, FX/Full Frame sensor, December 1, 2008
- Nikon D3S, FX/Full Frame sensor, October 14, 2009
- Nikon D4, FX/Full Frame sensor, January 6, 2012
- Nikon D4S, FX/Full Frame sensor, February 25, 2014
- Nikon D5, FX/Full Frame sensor, January 5, 2016
- Nikon D6, FX/Full Frame sensor, February 12, 2020

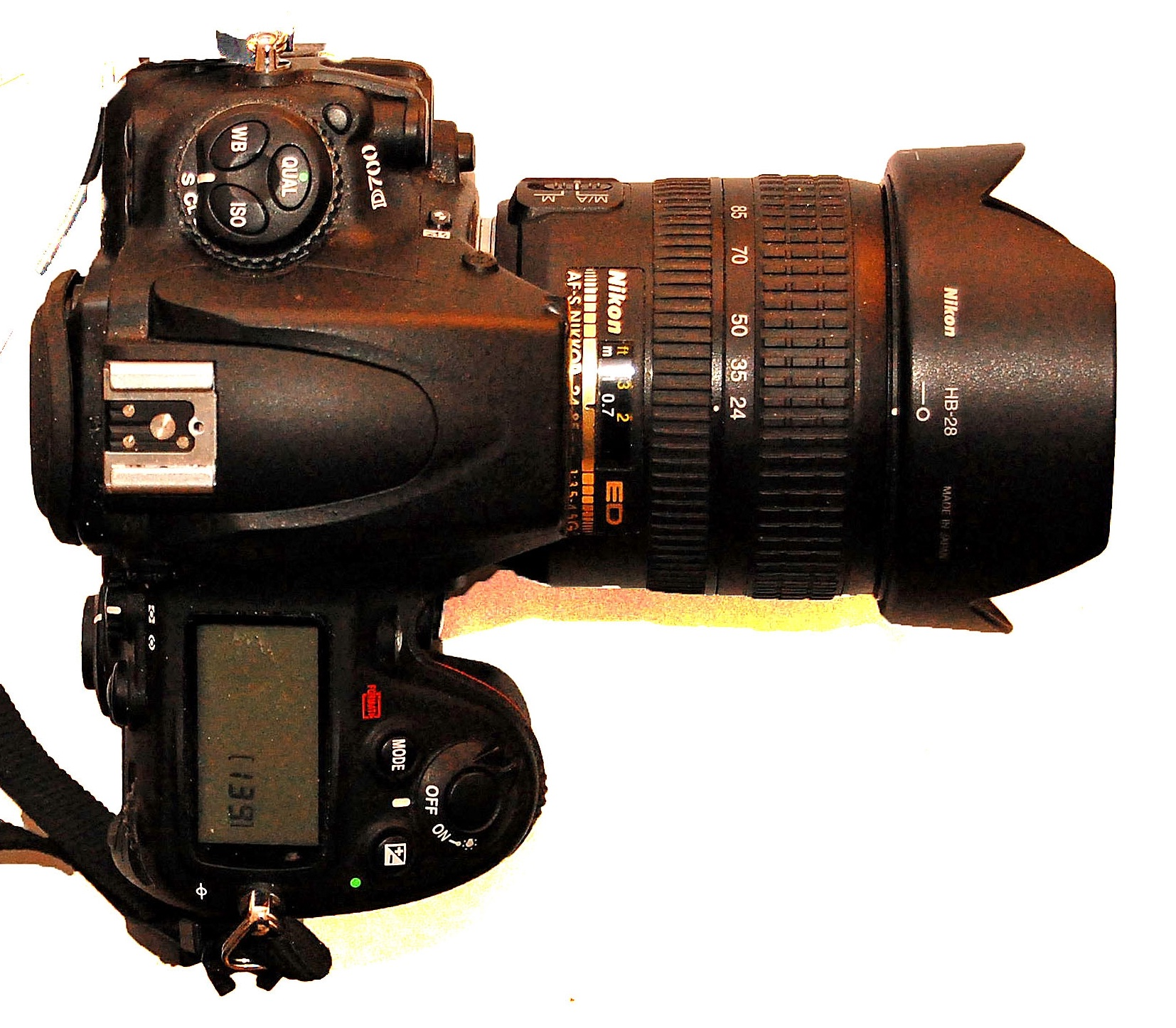
D700 with AF-S 24-85mm f/3.5-4.5G

===== High-end (Prosumer) =====
Intended for pro-consumers who want the main mechanical/weather resistance and electronic features of the professional line but don't need the same heavy duty durability.

- Nikon D100, DX sensor, February 21, 2002
- Nikon D200, DX sensor, November 1, 2005
- Nikon D300, DX sensor, August 23, 2007
- Nikon D300S, DX sensor, July 30, 2009
- Nikon D700, FX/Full Frame sensor, July 1, 2008
- Nikon D800, FX/Full Frame sensor, February 7, 2012
- Nikon D800E, FX/Full Frame sensor, April 2012
- Nikon D600, FX/Full Frame sensor, September 13, 2012
- Nikon D610, FX/Full Frame sensor, October 2013
- Nikon Df, FX/Full Frame sensor, November 2013
- Nikon D810, FX/Full Frame sensor, June 2014
- Nikon D750, FX/Full Frame sensor, September 11, 2014
- Nikon D810A, FX/Full Frame sensor, February 10, 2015
- Nikon D500, DX sensor, January 5, 2016
- Nikon D850, FX/Full Frame sensor, announced July 25, 2017
- Nikon D780, FX/Full Frame sensor, January 7, 2020

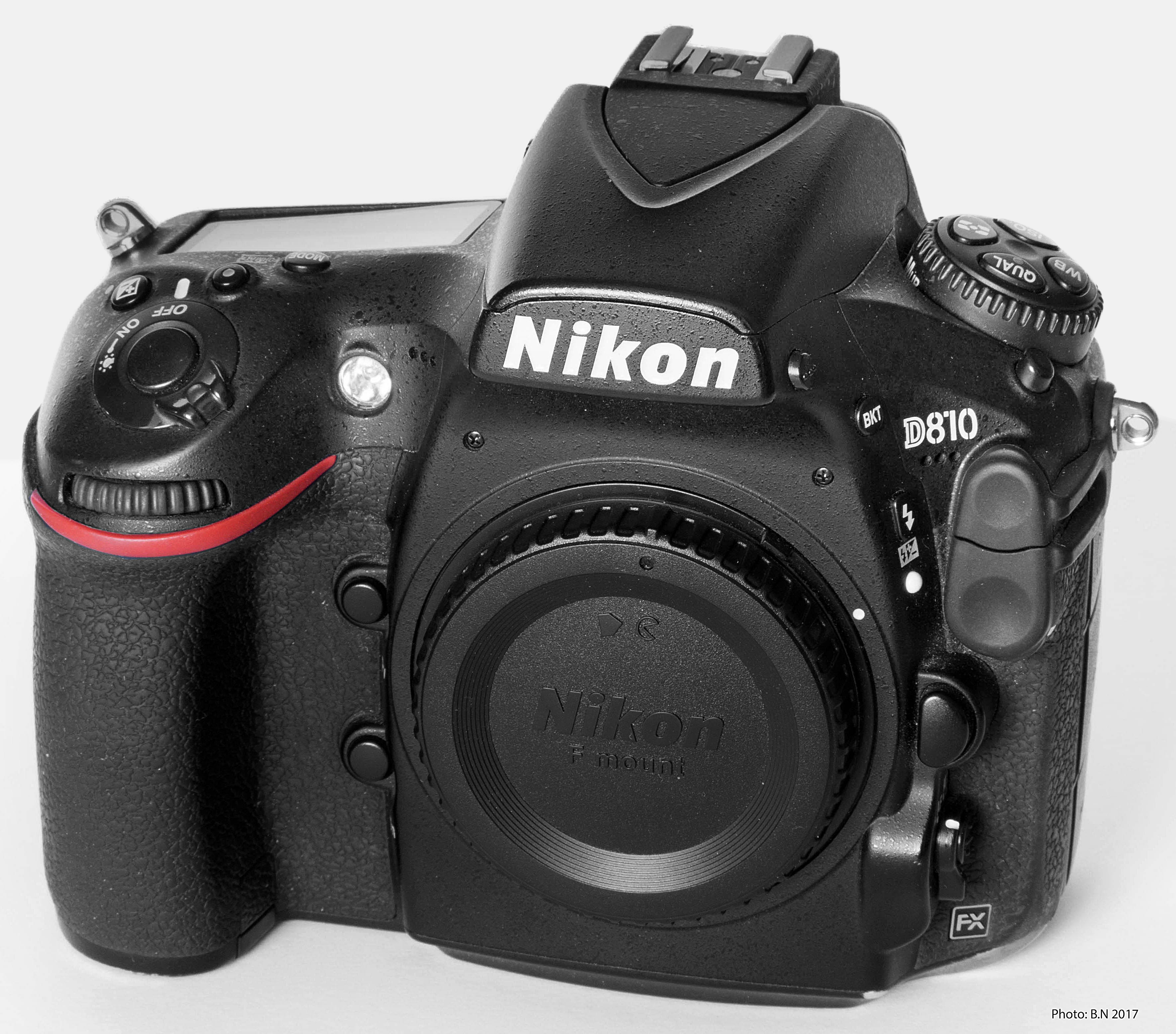
Nikon D810

===== Midrange and professional cameras with DX sensor =====
- Nikon D70, January 28, 2004
- Nikon D70S, April 20, 2005
- Nikon D80, August 9, 2006
- Nikon D90, August 27, 2008
- Nikon D7000, September 15, 2010
- Nikon D7100, February 21, 2013
- Nikon D7200, March 2, 2015
- Nikon D7500, April 12, 2017

===== Upper-entry-level (Consumer, DX sensor) =====
Along with the D750 and D500 above, these are the only Nikon DSLR's with the articulated (tilt-and-swivel) display.

- Nikon D5000, April 14, 2009
- Nikon D5100, April 5, 2011
- Nikon D5200, November 6, 2012
- Nikon D5300, October 17, 2013
- Nikon D5500, January 5, 2015
- Nikon D5600, November 10, 2016

===== Entry-level (Consumer, DX sensor) =====
- Nikon D50, April 20, 2005
- Nikon D40, November 16, 2006
- Nikon D40X, March 6, 2007
- Nikon D60, January 29, 2008
- Nikon D3000, July 30, 2009
- Nikon D3100, August 19, 2010
- Nikon D3200, April 19, 2012
- Nikon D3300, January 7, 2014
- Nikon D3400, August 17, 2016
- Nikon D3500, August 3, 2018

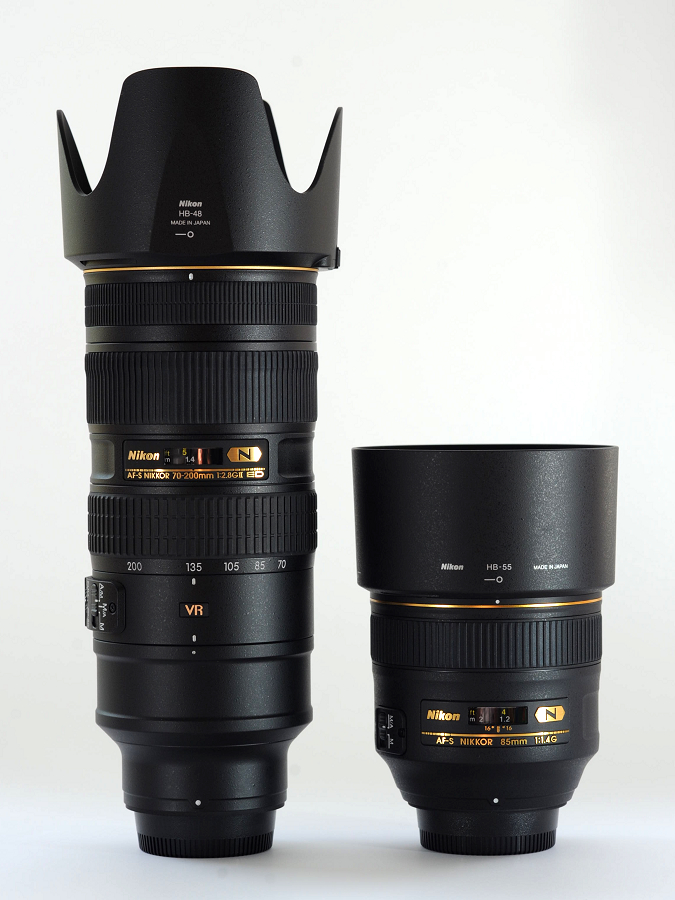
Nikon AF-S Nikkor 70-200mm F2.8G ED VR II lens and AF-S Nikkor 85mm F1.4G lens with lens hoods

==== Nikon digital file naming ====
Nikon's raw image format is NEF, for Nikon Electronic File. The "DSCN" prefix for image files stands for "Digital Still Camera – Nikon."

=== Photo optics ===
==== Lenses for Nikon Z-mount ====
Nikon introduced the Z-mount in 2018 for its system of digital full-frame (FX) and APS-C (DX) mirrorless cameras.

==== Lenses for Nikon 1-mount ====
Nikon introduced the 1-mount in 2011 for its system of digital crop-sensor CX format mirrorless cameras. They were produced until 2018, when the Z-mount was introduced.

==== Lenses for F-mount cameras ====
The Nikon F-mount is a type of interchangeable lens mount developed by Nikon for its 35 mm Single-lens reflex cameras. The F-mount was first introduced on the Nikon F film camera in 1959. Starting in 1999, it was also used on their line of DSLR cameras, starting with the Nikon D1. This includes the IX-Nikkor zoom lenses.

==== Lenses for Nikon S-mount ====
Nikon introduced the S-mount in 1948 with its line of rangefinder cameras. They were produced until 1967.

=== Electronic flash units ===
Nikon uses the term Speedlight for its electronic flashes. Recent models include the SB-R200, SB-300, SB-400, SB-600, SB-700, SB-800, SB-900, SB-910, SB-5000 and R1C1.

Since the release of the SB-5000 in 2016, there have been no new flash units released.

=== Film scanners ===
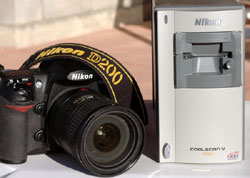
Nikon Coolscan V film scanner

Nikon's digital capture line also includes a successful range of dedicated scanners for a variety of formats, including Advanced Photo System (IX240), 35 mm, and 60 mm film.

- (1988) LS-3500 (4096x6144, 4000 dpi, 30 bits per pixel) HP-IB (requires a third-party NuBus card; intended for Mac platforms, for which there is a Photoshop plug-in).
- (1992) Coolscan LS-10 (2700 dpi) SCSI. First to be named "Coolscan" to denote LED illumination.
- (1994) LS-3510AF (4096x6144, 4000 dpi, 30 bits per pixel) Auto-focus SCSI (usually employed on Mac platforms with a Photoshop plug-in; TWAIN is available for PC platforms).
- (1995) LS-4500AF (4 x 5 inch and 120/220 formats, 1000x2000 dpi, 35mm format 3000x3000). 12bit A/D. SCSI. Fitted with auto-focus lens.
- (1996) Super Coolscan LS-1000 (2592x3888, 2700 dpi) SCSI. scan time cut by half
- (1996) Coolscan II LS-20 E (2700 dpi) SCSI
- (1998) Coolscan LS-2000 (2700 dpi, 12-bit) SCSI, multiple sample, "CleanImage" software
- (1998) Coolscan III LS-30 E (2700 dpi, 10-bit) SCSI
- (2001) Coolscan IV LS-40 ED (2900 dpi, 12-bit, 3.6D) USB, SilverFast, ICE, ROC, GEM
- (2001) Coolscan LS-4000 ED (4000 dpi, 14-bit, 4.2D) Firewire
- (2001) Coolscan LS-8000 ED (4000 dpi, 14-bit, 4.2D) Firewire, multiformat
- (2003) Coolscan V LS-50 ED (4000 dpi, 14-bit, 4.2D) USB
- (2003) Super Coolscan LS-5000 ED (4000 dpi, 16bit, 4.8D) USB
- (2004) Super Coolscan LS-9000 ED (4000 dpi, 16bit, 4.8D) Firewire, multiformat

Nikon introduced its first scanner, the Nikon LS-3500 with a maximum resolution of 4096 x 6144 pixels, in 1988. Prior to the development of 'cool' LED lighting this scanner used a halogen lamp (hence the name 'Coolscan' for the following models). The resolution of the following LED based Coolscan model didn't increase but the price was significantly lower. Colour depth, scan quality, imaging and hardware functionality as well as scanning speed was gradually improved with each following model.

The final 'top of the line' 35mm Coolscan LS-5000 ED was a device capable of archiving greater numbers of slides; 50 framed slides or 40 images on film roll. It could scan all these in one batch using special adapters. A single maximum resolution scan was performed in no more than 20 seconds as long as no post-processing was also performed.

With the launch of the Coolscan 9000 ED Nikon introduced its most up-to-date film scanner which, like the Minolta DiMAGE scanners were the only film scanners that, due to a special version of Digital ICE, were able to scan Kodachrome film reliably both dust and scratch free. In late 2007 much of the software's code had to be rewritten to make it Mac OS 10.5 compatible. Nikon announced it would discontinue supporting its Nikon Scan software for the Macintosh as well as for Windows Vista 64-bit. Third-party software solutions like SilverFast or Vuescan provide alternatives to the official Nikon drivers and scanning software, and maintain updated drivers for most current operating systems.

Between 1994 and 1996 Nikon developed three flatbed scanner models named Scantouch, which couldn't keep up with competitive flatbed products and were hence discontinued to allow Nikon to focus on its dedicated film scanners.

=== Sport optics ===
==== Binoculars ====
- Sprint IV
- Sportstar IV
- Travelite V
- Travelite VI
- Travelite EX
- Mikron
- Action VII
- Action VII Zoom
- Aculon
- Action EX
- Sporter I
- Venturer 8/10x32
- Venturer 8x42
- Prostaff 5
- Prostaff 7
- Monarch ATB
- Monarch 3
- Monarch 5
- Monarch 7
- Monarch HG
- Monarch M5
- Monarch M7
- StabilEyes
- Superior E
- Marine
- EDG II

==== Spotting scopes ====
- Prostaff 3 16-48x60
- Prostaff 5 60
- Prostaff 5 80
- Spotter XL II WP
- Spotting Scope R/A II
- Spotting Scope 80
- Fieldscope 60mm
- Fieldscope ED78/ EDII
- Fieldscope III/EDIII
- Fieldscope ED82
- Fieldscope ED50
- Fieldscopes EDG 65 /85
- Fieldscope EDG 85 VR

==== Former rifle scopes ====
At the end of 2019, Nikon informed dealers in North America that it would discontinue its riflescope line while continuing its binocular, laser-rangefinder and spotting-scope businesses. The following models had been sold under the Nikon brand.

- BLACK
- Monarch 7
- Monarch 5
- Monarch 3
- Monarch
- Laser IRT
- Prostaff 5
- Encore
- Coyote Special
- Slughunter
- Inline
- Buckmaster II
- Buckmaster
- AR
- ProStaff II
- Prostaff
- Team REALTREE
- Rimfire
- Handgun

== Precision Equipment ==
The Precision Equipment business develops and manufactures semiconductor and flat-panel-display lithography systems and related metrology and inspection systems. Nikon introduced Japan's first commercial LSI stepper in 1980.

=== Lithography equipment ===
==== Overview ====
Nikon manufactures scanners and steppers for the manufacture of integrated circuits and flat panel displays, and semiconductor device inspection equipment. The steppers and scanners represented about one third of the company's income in 2008.

Nikon developed the first lithography equipment from Japan. The equipment from Nikon enjoyed high demand from global chipmakers, the Japanese semiconductor companies and other major companies such as Intel, and Nikon was the world's leading producer of semiconductor lithography systems from the 1980s to 2002. ASML had taken the lead in lithography shipments in 1999, with a 36% market share in exposure tools while Nikon retained 34% of the market. Nikon saw a sharp drop in its market share from less than 40 percent in early 2000s to no more than 20 percent as of 2013.

In contrast, ASML, a Dutch company, held over 80 percent of the lithography systems market in 2015 by adopting an open innovation method of product development, which includes the acquisition of US-based light source manufacturer Cymer. In 2017, Nikon announced that it would cut nearly 1,000 jobs mainly in the lithography systems business and halt its development of next-generation equipment.

During the 2010s, Nikon also developed an ArF immersion lithography system for 450 mm wafers. By 2015 a prototype system had been completed and plans for a mass-production system had been discussed. The wider semiconductor industry's transition to 450 mm wafers subsequently stalled; the Global 450 Consortium completed the first phase of its work at the end of 2016 without setting a date for a second phase.

==== Legal disputes ====
In February 2019, Nikon, ASML and Carl Zeiss AG, a leading supplier to ASML, entered into a definitive settlement and cross-license agreement relating to multiple disputes over patents for lithography equipment that had been underway since 2001, and agreed to end the related litigation worldwide.

Under the settlement, ASML and Zeiss paid approximately $170 million to Nikon. The two companies had paid a total of $87 million to Nikon in 2004 for similar legal dispute.

==== Market position and recent products ====
As of February 2018, Nikon held 10.3 percent revenue share in the semiconductor lithography market while the share of ASML was over 80 percent.

In 2019, Nikon listed the following lithography-related equipment:

- Cutting-edge flat panel display lithography equipment (The FX series)
- i-line steppers
- KrF steppers
- ArF steppers
- ArF immersion steppers
- Inspection and alignment equipment

In the 2020s, Nikon continued to develop ArF lithography systems and expanded into digital lithography systems for advanced semiconductor packaging. Orders for the DSP-100, Nikon's first digital lithography system for semiconductor packaging applications, began in July 2025. The system has a resolution of 1.0 µm L/S and a throughput of 50 panels per hour using 510×515 mm substrates, and is scheduled for release in fiscal year 2026. In June 2026, Nikon announced development of another digital lithography system with 1.5 µm L/S resolution and a target throughput of at least 65 panels per hour, scheduled for release in fiscal year 2027. Nikon has also been jointly developing a new ArF immersion lithography system with a major semiconductor manufacturer; in 2025 it stated that a prototype of the next-generation series was planned for delivery in fiscal year 2028. Under the company's FY2026–2030 medium-term management plan, Precision Equipment is positioned as one of the businesses targeted for longer-term growth.

== Healthcare ==
The Healthcare business includes biological microscopes and other life-science systems, retinal imaging systems, and contract development and manufacturing services for regenerative medicine. Nikon acquired Optos plc, a developer of ultra-widefield retinal imaging systems, in 2015.

== Industry ==
The Industry business includes industrial microscopes, image-measuring systems, X-ray and CT inspection systems, laser radar, robotics-related products and optical components. Optical components include optical materials and parts, EUV-related components, photomask substrates, and industrial lenses and units.

=== Nikon Metrology ===
==== Overview ====
Nikon Metrology, part of Nikon's industrial-measurement operations, has produced hardware and software products for 2D and 3D measurement across a wide range of measurement volumes. Products have included Optical Laser Probes, X-ray computed tomography, Coordinate-measuring machine (CMM), Laser Radar Systems (LR), Microscopes, Portable CMMs, Large Volume Metrology, Motion Measurement and Adaptive Robotic Controls, Semiconductor Systems, Metrology Software including CMM-Manager, CAMIO Studio, Inspect-X, Focus, and Automeasure. Measurements are performed using tactile and non-contact probes, measurement data is collected in software and processed for comparison to nominal CAD (Computer-aided design) or part specification or for recreating / reverse engineering physical work pieces.

==== Origins ====
In 2009, Nikon expanded its industrial metrology portfolio through the acquisition of Metris, adding optical 3D measurement technologies to its existing measurement and microscopy operations. The Nikon Metrology business subsequently offered product lines including X-ray and CT systems, laser radar, video measuring systems, optical manual measuring instruments and industrial microscopy.

==== Products ====
- Coordinate-Measuring-Machines
  - Bridge, Gantry and Horizontal Arm CMMs
  - Digital / Analog Tactile and / or Non-Contact Optical sensors
- Portable arms – 6 and 7 axis models
- Laser Scanning – Optical Line Scanners in single Line and Multi-line (Cross Scanner) configurations
- X-ray-and-CT-Inspection
- Video-Microscope-Measuring – Optical Probe and Multi-Sensor options available
- Microscope-Systems
- Large Volume Systems
- Application Software – several options available depending on specific application and hardware.
  - CMM-Manager – Multi-sensor 3D Metrology software for third party CMMs, Articulated Arms, and Nikon video-measurement systems
  - Automeasure, NIS Elements, E-Max, Automeasure Eyes – 2D / 3D imaging software for use on Nikon video-measurement systems
  - Focus, CMM-Manager, CAMIO – Software for 3D Metrology

== Digital Manufacturing ==
The Digital Manufacturing business includes metal additive manufacturing and laser-based material processing. Nikon made SLM Solutions a wholly owned subsidiary in 2023 and renamed the operation Nikon SLM Solutions. In FY2026, the business recorded an operating loss of ¥106.282 billion, including substantial impairment losses associated with the business.

== Other products ==
Nikon has also marketed eyeglasses, sunglasses, and glasses frames under the brands Nikon, Niji, Nobili-Ti, Presio, and Velociti VTI.

Nikon has designed image sensors for some of its cameras while outsourcing fabrication, including to Sony.

In 2019, Sendai Nikon, a Nikon group company, entered a manufacturing agreement to produce Lidar sensors for Velodyne.

== Contest and sponsorship ==
=== Nikon Film and Photo Contest ===
Nikon Film and Photo Contest, previously the Nikon Photo Contest Internationa (1969-2011) and Nikon Photo Contest (2012-2017), is an international competition organised annually for professionals and amateurs.

=== Awards and exhibitions ===
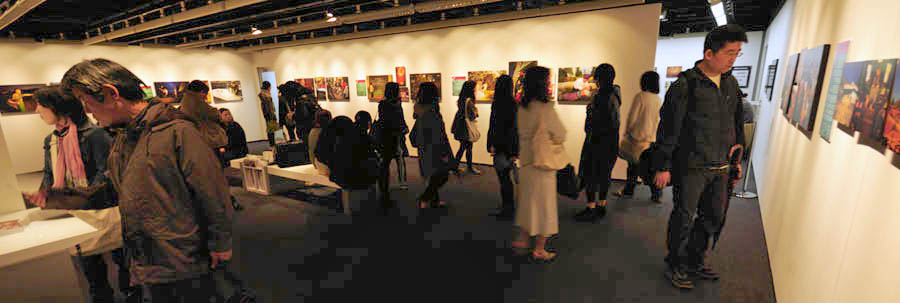
Inside the Nikon Salon

In Japan, Nikon runs the Nikon Salon exhibition spaces, the Nikkor Club for amateur photographers (to whom it distributes the series of Nikon Salon books), the Nikon Small World Photomicrography Competition and the Nikon Small World in Motion Competition, and arranges the Ina Nobuo Award, Miki Jun Award and Miki Jun Inspiration Awards.

=== Others ===
As of November 19, 2013, Nikon is the "Official Camera" of Walt Disney World Resort and Disneyland Resort.

Nikon is the official co-sponsor of Galatasaray SK Football Team.

In 2014 Nikon sponsored the Copa Sadia do Brasil 2014 and the AFC Champions League.

The company sponsors the Nikon-Walkley Press Photographer of the Year award, as well as the Nikon Photography Prizes, which are administered by the Walkley Foundation in Australia.

== Controversies ==
=== 2026 Small World in Motion Competition ===
Since 2011 Nikon Instruments hosts an annual competition for videos taken with microscopes as part of Nikon Small World. The first prize of the 2026 competition was initially awarded to a video claiming to show cilia in motion from a child with primary ciliary dyskinesia. Soon after the announcement of the winner, the authenticity of the video was questioned by microscopy experts, alleging that the video was biologically implausible and that it might have been hallucinated by an AI tool. The creator of the video, Dr. Ning Xu from the Tsinghua University, responded to the accusations with the claim that the video was "enhanced" with AI. He denied that it was entirely artificially generated and did not share an unprocessed version of the video. Nikon Instruments started an investigation and eventually disqualified the video, several weeks after the concerns were initially raised.

== Cultural references ==
- Singer Paul Simon referenced Nikon Cameras in his 1973 song "Kodachrome."
- Dexter Morgan, main character of the Showtime series Dexter, can be seen using a Nikon camera throughout the show.
- In the movie Hackers, the character "Lord Nikon" got his alias because of his photographic memory.
- In the lyrics to the Oak Ridge Boys song "American Made", a reference to Nikon Cameras is made ("I got a Nikon camera, a Sony color TV").
- In the movie The French Connection, the drug dealer gives his girlfriend a Nikon F camera.
- In the film The Most Beautiful by Akira Kurosawa, the "East Asian Optical Company" scenes were filmed at the Nippon Kogaku factory in Totsuka, Yokohama, Japan.
- In the TV show Veronica Mars, Veronica, the main character, uses a Nikon Coolpix 8800 throughout season one, and a Nikon D70 DSLR in all other seasons.

== Nikon school ==
Nikon branches around the world runs photography courses behind the brand Nikon School. The official website of Nikon School has offered an online photography course since 2016.

== See also ==
- Nikon camera types
  - Rangefinder camera
  - Single-lens reflex camera (SLR)
  - Digital compact camera
    - Nikon Coolpix series
  - Digital single-lens reflex camera (DSLR)
  - Mirrorless Interchangeable Lens Camera (MILC)
- History of the single-lens reflex camera
  - Nikon F
- Lenses for SLR and DSLR cameras
  - Nikkor
  - Perspective control lens
- Nikon Instruments
- Nikon Museum
- Nikon mounts (in order of introduction)
  - Nikon S-mount
  - Nikon F-mount
  - Nikon 1-mount
  - Nikon Z-mount
- Nikon sensor sizes
  - Nikon CX - 1"
  - Nikon DX - APS-C
  - Nikon FX - Full-frame
- Canon Inc

== Notes and references ==
Sensor	Class	2018	2019	2020	2021	2022	2023	2024	2025	2026
FX (Full-frame)	Flagship					^{8K} Z9 ^{S}				
FX (Full-frame)	Flagship							^{8K} Z8 ^{S}		
FX (Full-frame)	Professional		^{4K} Z7 ^{S}		^{4K} Z7Ⅱ ^{S}					
FX (Full-frame)	Professional		^{4K} Z6 ^{S}		^{4K} Z6Ⅱ ^{S}				^{6K} Z6Ⅲ ^{S}	
FX (Full-frame)	Cinema									^{6K} ZR ^{S}
FX (Full-frame)	Enthusiast							^{4K} Zf ^{S}		
FX (Full-frame)	Enthusiast				^{4K} Z5 ^{S}					^{4K} Z5Ⅱ ^{S}
FX (Full-frame)	Entry-level									^{4K} Z5ⅡC ^{S}
DX (APS-C)	Enthusiast								^{4K} Z50Ⅱ	
DX (APS-C)	Enthusiast					^{4K} Zfc				
DX (APS-C)	Prosumer			^{4K} Z50						
DX (APS-C)	Entry-level						^{4K} Z30			
Sensor	Class									
Sensor	Class	2018	2019	2020	2021	2022	2023	2024	2025	2026

Sensor	Class	1999	2000	2001	2002	2003	2004	2005	2006	2007	2008	2009	2010	2011	2012	2013	2014	2015	2016	2017	2018	2019	2020	2021	2022	2023	2024	2025	2026
FX (Full-frame)	Flagship											D3X ^{−P}																	
FX (Full-frame)	Flagship										D3 ^{−P}		D3S ^{−P}		D4		D4S		D5^{T}					D6^{T}					
FX (Full-frame)	Professional											D700 ^{−P}			D800/D800E			D810/D810A			D850 ^{AT}								
FX (Full-frame)	Enthusiast																Df												
FX (Full-frame)	Enthusiast																	D750 ^{A}					D780 ^{AT}						
FX (Full-frame)	Enthusiast															D600	D610												
DX (APS-C)	Flagship		D1^{−E}	D1X^{−E}				D2X^{−E}		D2Xs^{−E}																			
DX (APS-C)	Flagship		D1^{−E}	D1H ^{−E}			D2H^{−E}	D2Hs^{−E}																					
DX (APS-C)	Professional				D100^{−E}				D200^{−E}		D300^{−P}		D300S^{−P}						D500 ^{AT}										
DX (APS-C)	Enthusiast						D70^{−E}		D70s^{−E}	D80^{−E}		D90^{−E}		D7000 ^{−P}			D7100	D7200			D7500 ^{AT}								
DX (APS-C)	Upper-entry								D50^{−E}	D40X^{−E*}	D60^{−E*}		D5000^{A−P*}		D5100^{A−P*}	D5200^{A−P*}	D5300^{A*}	D5500^{AT*}		D5600 ^{AT*}									
DX (APS-C)	Entry-level									D40^{−E*}			D3000^{−E*}	D3100^{−P*}		D3200^{−P*}	D3300^{*}			D3400^{*}		D3500^{*}							
Early models		SVC (prototype; 1986); QV-1000C (1988); NASA F4 (1991); E2/E2S (1995); E2N/E2NS (1996); E3/E3S (1998)																											
Sensor	Class																												
Sensor	Class	1999	2000	2001	2002	2003	2004	2005	2006	2007	2008	2009	2010	2011	2012	2013	2014	2015	2016	2017	2018	2019	2020	2021	2022	2023	2024	2025	2026

Class	2011		2012	2013	2014	2015	2016	2017	2018
High-end		1 V1		1 V2	1 V3 ^{AT}				Nikon Z
Mid-range		1 J1	1 J2	1 J3		1 J4 ^{T}	1 J5 ^{AT}		Nikon Z
Entry-level				1 S1		1 S2			Nikon Z
Rugged					1 AW1 ^{S}				Nikon Z
Class									
Class	2011		2012	2013	2014	2015	2016	2017	2018

Class	1950s			1960s										1970s										1980s										1990s										2000s										2020s			
Class	57	58	59	60	61	62	63	64	65	66	67	68	69	70	71	72	73	74	75	76	77	78	79	80	81	82	83	84	85	86	87	88	89	90	91	92	93	94	95	96	97	98	99	00	01	02	03	04	05	06	07	08	09	...	20	21	22
Profes- sional			F																					F3																																	
Profes- sional															F2												F3AF					F4								F5								F6									
High- end																											FA					F-801 (N8008)/ F-801s (N8008s)				F90 (N90)		F90X (N90s)					F100														
Mid- range																														F-501 (N2020)				F-601 (N6006)				F70 (N70)						F80 (N80)													
Mid- range																EL / EL2 /ELW						FE					FE2							F-601M (N6000)				F70 (N70)						F80 (N80)													
Mid- range									FT		FTn/ FT2/ FT3										FM					FM2/FM2n																			FM3A												
Mid- range									FS												FM					FM2/FM2n																			FM3A												
Entry- level																																																									
Entry- level																																								Pronea 600i/6i																	
Entry- level																																										Pronea S															
Entry- level						Nikkorex F / Nikkor J																	EM			FG			F-301 (N2000)				F-401s (N4004s)					F50 (N50)							F65 (N65 / U)		F75 (N75 / U2)										
Entry- level				35		35 II		Auto 35																				FG-20			F-401 (N4004)				F-401x (N5005)								F60 (N60)			F55 (N55)											
Entry- level							Zoom 35																																FM10 / FE10																		
Class	57	58	59	60	61	62	63	64	65	66	67	68	69	70	71	72	73	74	75	76	77	78	79	80	81	82	83	84	85	86	87	88	89	90	91	92	93	94	95	96	97	98	99	00	01	02	03	04	05	06	07	08	09	...	20	21	22
Class	1950s			1960s										1970s										1980s										1990s										2000s										2020s			

1948	1949	1950	1951	1952	1953	1954	1955	1956	1957	1958	1959	1960	1961	1962	1963	1964	1965	1966	1967
Nikon^{NF}																			
		M^{NF}																	
			S^{F}																
							S2^{F}												
										S3^{F}									
											SP^{F}								
											S4^{F}								
													S3M^{F}						
Specials		S3 2000 (2000); SP Limited Edition (2005)																	
