= Pat Graham (photographer) =

American photographer

Pat Graham (born 1970, in Milwaukee, Wisconsin) is an American-born photographer living in England. Graham first earned an international reputation for his photography of indie rock and punk rock musicians. His work is featured in the artwork for several notable recordings, and is also in the permanent collection at the Museum of Pop Culture in Seattle, Washington. Recent years has brought the expansion of his oeuvre into commercial photography.

== Education ==
Pat Graham holds an MA in Photojournalism and Documentary Photography from the University of Westminster in London, and is currently an MFA candidate at the School of the Art Institute of Chicago (expected 2020). Previously he attended the University of Wisconsin for two years before leaving for Washington, DC to document the independent music scene thriving there and continuing his studies at the Northern Virginia Community College. His interest in photography however began in high school in Waukesha, Wisconsin and his grandparents gave him his first camera as a gift.

== Early work/life ==
In 1990, Graham was a co-organizer of a Fugazi concert at the Waukesha Expo center (see http://www.dischord.com/fugazi_live_series/waukesha-wi-usa-61590). The band stayed at Graham's family home and their visit proved inspirational for Graham, especially as Ian MacKaye introduced Graham to the Positive Force DC activist house and the people who lived there. Later that year, Graham and his friends traveled to DC for an animal rights protest march. While in DC, Graham stayed at Positive Force befriending the activists, artists, and musicians living at the house.

In January 1992, Graham relocated to Washington, D.C., becoming immersed in the local underground music community. It was in Washington that Graham first earned wide recognition for his efforts documenting the riot grrrl movement, including his seminal photography of Bikini Kill. Over the next ten years, Graham toured internationally with bands such as Modest Mouse, Tortoise, June of 44, and The Make-Up, capturing their traveling experiences, as well as shooting promotional photographs for the artists.

In 1997, Graham collaborated with photographer Cynthia Connolly and created an exhibition called DC People with their Cars and on Stage. The show featured Connolly's portraits of DC musicians with their cars and Graham's pictures of the same musicians playing live. The exhibition traveled throughout the US and Europe from 1997 – 2000.

In 2001, he was Artist-in-Residence at the Grange Hall in Wakefield, Rhode Island.

== Relocation to London and 96 Gillespie ==
In 2000, Graham relocated to London, England, and established with Melanie Standage the non-profit gallery 96 Gillespie, a converted post office. The mission of 96 Gillespie is to “...establish dialogue between US and UK artists.” Concurrent to the development of the new gallery, in 2003 Graham began to expand into commercial photography by collaborating with Anomaly NYC and Umbro on a series of works pertaining to each of England's football teams' away shirts. This work led to shooting sporting events and professional athletes.

In 2007, while at 96 Gillespie, the band Modest Mouse again hired Graham, this time to provide a photoblog for the band for their next two years' worth of activity. As the band's popularity was at its greatest during this period, the photoblog generated considerable attention for Graham, and his own reputation expanded into a new audience. This did not prohibit Graham from publishing his first book of select works, Silent Pictures (Akashic Books, 2007).

== Recent work ==
Chronicle Books published in 2011 Graham's second book, Instrument. Graham describes the book as documenting “...musicians and their instruments and the stories behind what they mean to them”. Amazon awarded the book a Best Book Cover for 2011. In that same year, the guitarist Johnny Marr (The Smiths, Modest Mouse, others) and the sunglasses company Ray Ban selected Graham for the Ray Band Raw Sounds Project, a collaboration between notable rock artists and the company. The work was exhibited in Hong Kong, New York, and in London.

Further select commercial photography clients include Anomaly, Apple, BBC, CABE, Converse, Darling Dept, Focus Group, Hard Rock Hotel, Less Rain Design, Libre Design, Not Actual Size, Poker Stars, Raen Optics, Tottenham Hotspur Football Club, Umbro, The Victoria & Albert Museum, and Wolff Olins.

Graham continues to work with Johnny Marr and other musicians. PowerHouse Books (Brooklyn) will publish Graham's third book, Modest Mouse 1992-2010, in fall of 2014.

== Gear ==
When interviewed, Graham has stated that he has used or uses:

- Pentax P5, 6×7
- Nikon 6006, 8008, N90, D200, D700, D3S, D800
- Olympus Pen FT
- Polaroid SX-70, Polaroid 600, and others
- Zeiss Super Ikonta III
- Rolleiflex 3.5f
- Fuji 645
- As well as "...a dozen or so film cameras and one digital camera."

== Creative Philosophy ==
“It really comes down to being in the right place at the right time and knowing how to compose under pressure.”

== Books ==
- Silent Pictures. New York, NY: Akashic Books, 2007.
- Instrument. San Francisco, CA: Chronicle, 2011.
- Modest Mouse 1992-2010. Brooklyn, NY: powerHouse Books, 2014.

== Select exhibitions and residencies ==
- Artist-in-residence, Grange Hall, Wakefield, RI, 2001.
- Experience Music Project. Seattle, WA, Permanent collection
- Arlington Municipal Art Collection. Arlington, VA
- “Past Perfect.” With Melanie Standage. Transformer Gallery Washington, DC, Oct 2005; 96 Gillespie, London, UK, 2006. (see http://www.transformerdc.org/exhibitions/overview/past-perfect)
- "Silent Pictures a Solo Photography Exhibit by Pat Graham," Needles and Pens, Oct - Nov 2007 (see http://www.needles-pens.com/silentpicsshow.html)
- "Retrospect," with Melanie Standage. Space 1026, Philadelphia, Jan 2007 (see http://www.philadelphiaweekly.com/arts-and-culture/editors_picks-38422824.html)
- "Instrument." Solo. Rough Trade, East London, Oct 2011. (see http://roughtradeshop.blogspot.co.uk/2011/10/pat-graham-instrument.html)
- Ray Band Raw Sounds Project. Hong Kong, London, and New York, 2011. (see http://www.bangkokpost.com/print/273292/)
- “In Color and Black & White: The Photography of Pat Graham.” Ramp Gallery, Portland, OR, December 2012.
