= Nikon F-501 =

1986 35mm single-lens reflex camera

Nikon F-501 (N2020)
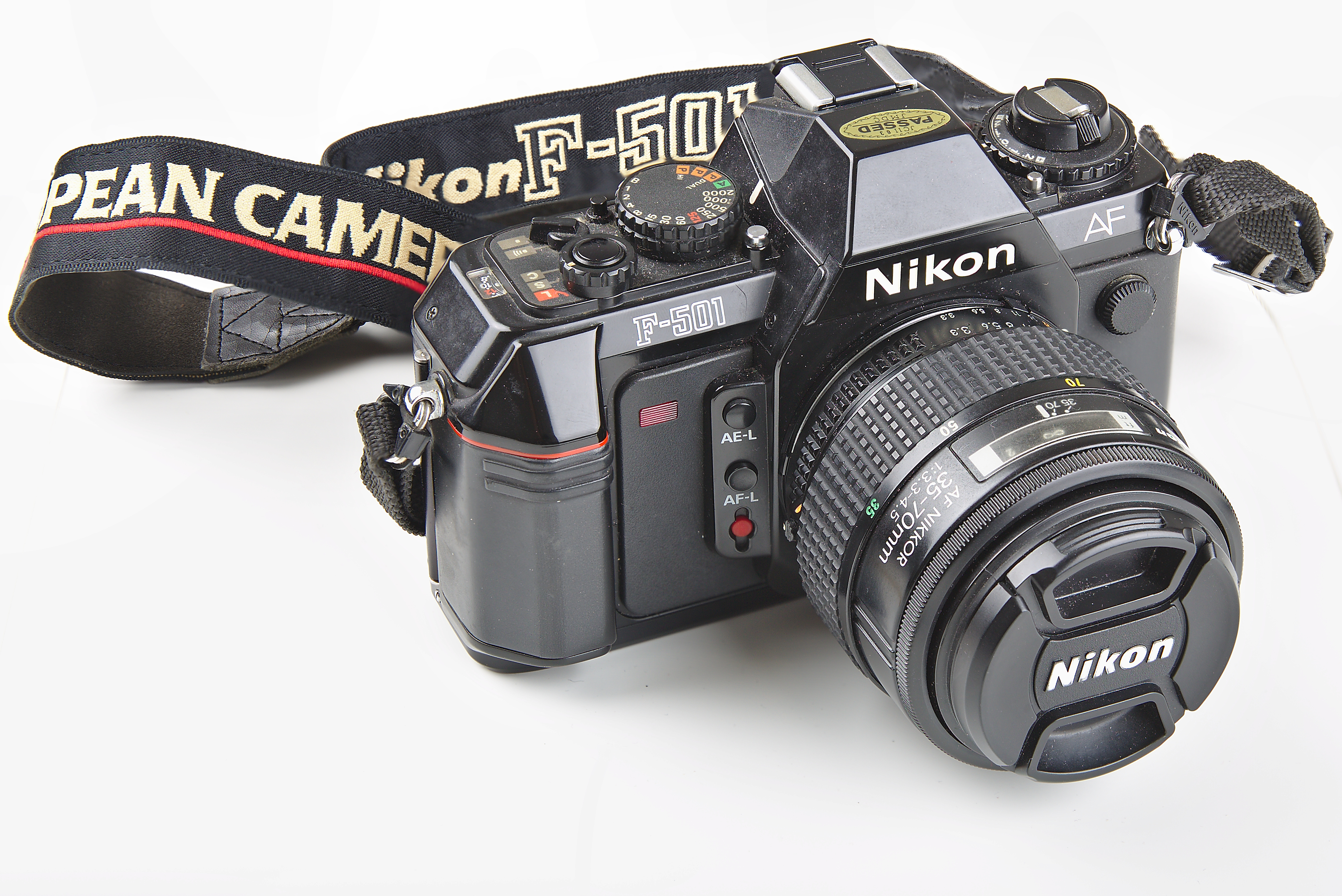

Overview
- Maker: Nikon
- Type: 35mm SLR

Lens
- Lens mount: Nikon F-mount

Focusing
- Focus: TTL Phase Detection Autofocus (1 zone)

Exposure/metering
- Exposure: Center-weighted

Shutter
- Frame rate: 2.5 frame/s

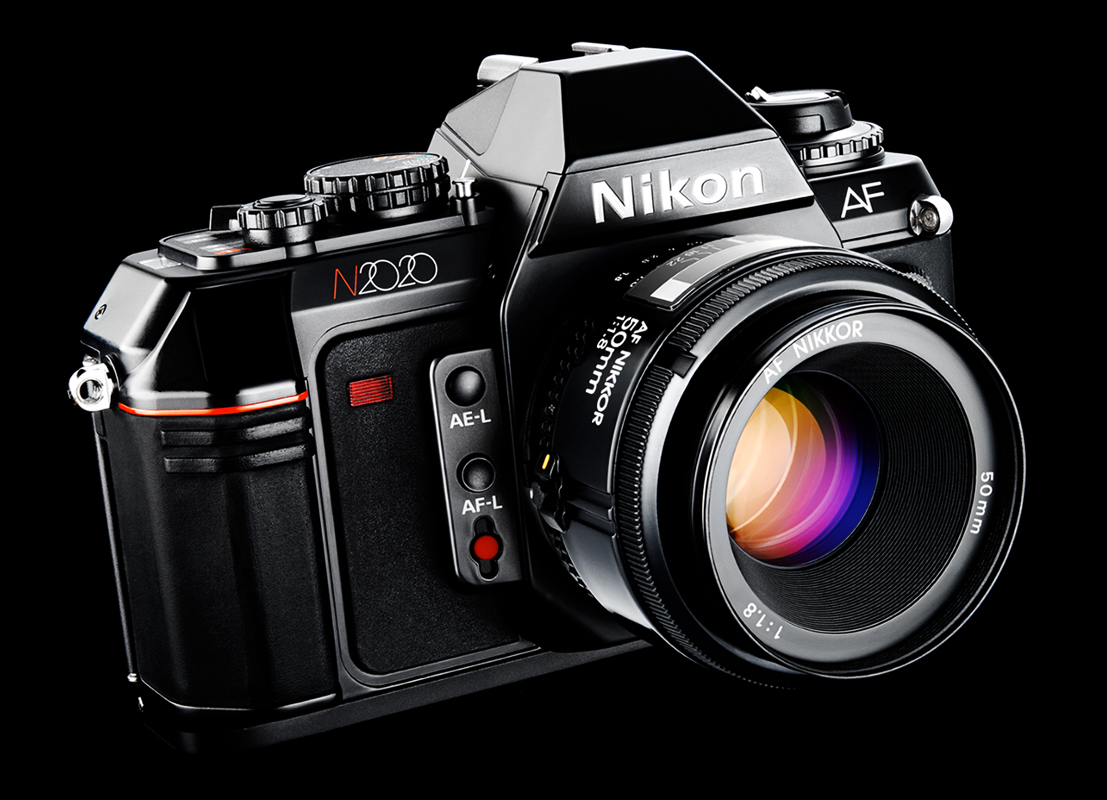
"N2020"-branded version with AF Nikkor 50mm lens attached

The Nikon F-501 (sold in North America as the N2020) was the first successful autofocus SLR camera sold by the Nikon Corporation beginning in April, 1986. A nearly identical, albeit manual focus version, called the Nikon F-301 (N2000 in North America) was also available. Subsequent models in the consumer line included the Nikon F-401, Nikon F-601, and Nikon F-801 / F-801s.

== Features ==
The F-501 is a 35 mm single-lens reflex camera with automatic film loading and advance, almost a first for Nikon (the F-301 was their first SLR to feature this). The built-in motor drive provides single (one exposure and frame advance per shutter button press) or continuous (shutter will fire and film will advance so long as the shutter button is depressed) modes. Maximum film advance speed is 2.5 frames per second (frame/s) on continuous mode, but can be as slow as 1.4 frames/s depending on the status of the focus/exposure locks. Rewind is accomplished manually by a familiar rewind knob which doubled as a release for the back. The F-501 is powered by four AAA batteries housed in the bottom of the camera body, although it can utilize AA sized batteries with an optional attachment (MB-3).

The F-501 uses a through-the-lens (TTL) "passive" phase-detection autofocus method for establishing focus. Unlike active systems, which set approximate focus based on distance to the subject, the "passive" system uses a CCD to "see" the focus subject and focus in a manner similar to a human operator. This method is more precise than the active method, but requires more light to function. The F-501 has two focus modes available, single, in which focus is established and does not change so long as the operator holds down lightly on the shutter button, and continuous, in which the lens continuously re-focuses on whatever is in the focus area.

The F-501 is one of only three cameras, the others being the F3-AF and the F4, which can autofocus with the two AF-NIKKOR lenses introduced for the F3-AF, the 80 mm 1:2.8 and the 200 mm 1:3.5. Unlike other lenses, AF-NIKKOR lenses use a focus motor in the lens, rather than a mechanical coupling from a motor in the camera. AF-I, AF-S and AF-P Nikkor lenses also use a focus motor in the lens, but are not compatible with the short-lived system introduced with the F3-AF.

The F-501 can be set for auto exposure, "hi-speed" auto exposure, "dual" auto-exposure (with AI-S type lenses) which switches between regular auto exposure and hi-speed autoexposure based on the lens attached, aperture priority, or full manual exposure modes, which allow the user to set both the aperture and shutter speeds. The shutter speed and auto-exposure modes are set by the use of a dial on the top of the camera, while the aperture ring on the lens is used for aperture control. The "hi-speed" auto-exposure tends to favor higher shutter speeds and wider aperture settings than the "normal" auto exposure mode, while the "dual" mode offers "normal" auto-exposure with lenses at focal lengths less than 135 mm and "hi-speed" auto-exposure if a lens is longer than 135 mm.

The F-501 supports TTL flash exposures with a wide range of Nikon flashes. The Nikon SB-20 flash was especially designed for this camera.

== Compatibility ==
Like all Nikon SLRs, the F-501 accepts Nikon's F-mount lenses, but will only autofocus with lenses designated "AF." Likewise, fully automatic exposure will only work with AI-S type lenses, including many autofocus lenses (G-type lenses are not supported by the F-501). In both cases, the camera will function with lenses without these abilities, but will not autofocus or may not have full auto exposure capabilities. AF lenses designated "D" add no functionality to the F-501, and "AF-S" and "VR" lenses will not perform their special functions if attached to an F-501.

Continuing Nikon's practice at time, the F-501 has interchangeable focusing screens, a feature that is now quite unusual. Three screens (types B, E and J) were available for the F-501.

Breaking from practice, though, Nikon removed the ISO-type cable release socket. Remote control functionality is still available, however, through the three-pin terminal on the camera's front with the Remote Cord MC-12 and the like. ISO cable releases can be accepted by the Terminal Release MR-3, which also doubles as a second shutter button.

== Design ==
In design terms, the F-501 took a different look from previous Nikon cameras. The introduction of a polycarbonate-clad body rather than metal, which caused the camera to be black instead of silver, was the most immediate and obvious change. Also new to this model is the addition of an extended grip on the shutter button side of the camera body, a feature which has grown in subsequent autofocus SLR camera designs ever since. Nikon adopted some design concepts from the F501 in the company's first professional autofocus SLR, the Nikon F4, in 1988.

Less obvious is the addition of a red stripe on the right hand front side of the camera. The stripe first appeared in the Nikon F3 in 1980, and some variation of it has been a design feature of every Nikon autofocus camera since, but on the F-501 the stripe is horizontal rather than vertical for the first time.

== Notes ==
Class	1950s					1960s										1970s										1980s										1990s										2000s										2020s			
Class	55	56	57	58	59	60	61	62	63	64	65	66	67	68	69	70	71	72	73	74	75	76	77	78	79	80	81	82	83	84	85	86	87	88	89	90	91	92	93	94	95	96	97	98	99	00	01	02	03	04	05	06	07	08	09	...	20	21	22
Professional					F																					F3																																	
Professional																	F2												F3AF					F4								F5								F6									
High-end																													FA					F-801 (N8008)/ F-801s (N8008s)				F90 (N90)		F90X (N90s)					F100														
Mid-range																																F-501 (N2020)				F-601 (N6006)				F70 (N70)						F80 (N80)													
Mid-range																		EL / EL2 /ELW						FE					FE2							F-601M (N6000)				F70 (N70)						F80 (N80)													
Mid-range											FT		FTn/ FT2/ FT3										FM					FM2																			FM3A												
Mid-range											FS												FM					FM2																			FM3A												
Entry-level																																																											
Entry-level																																										Pronea S																	
Entry-level																																									Pronea 600i/6i																		
Entry-level								Nikkorex F / Nikkor J																	EM			FG			F-301 (N2000)				F-401s (N4004s)					F50 (N50)							F65 (N65 / U)		F75 (N75 / U2)										
Entry-level						35		35 II		Auto 35																				FG-20			F-401 (N4004)				F-401x (N5005)								F60 (N60)			F55 (N55)											
Entry-level									Zoom 35																																FM10 / FE10																		
Class	55	56	57	58	59	60	61	62	63	64	65	66	67	68	69	70	71	72	73	74	75	76	77	78	79	80	81	82	83	84	85	86	87	88	89	90	91	92	93	94	95	96	97	98	99	00	01	02	03	04	05	06	07	08	09	...	20	21	22
Class	1950s					1960s										1970s										1980s										1990s										2000s										2020s			
