= Nikon F-301 =

1985 35mm single-lens reflex camera

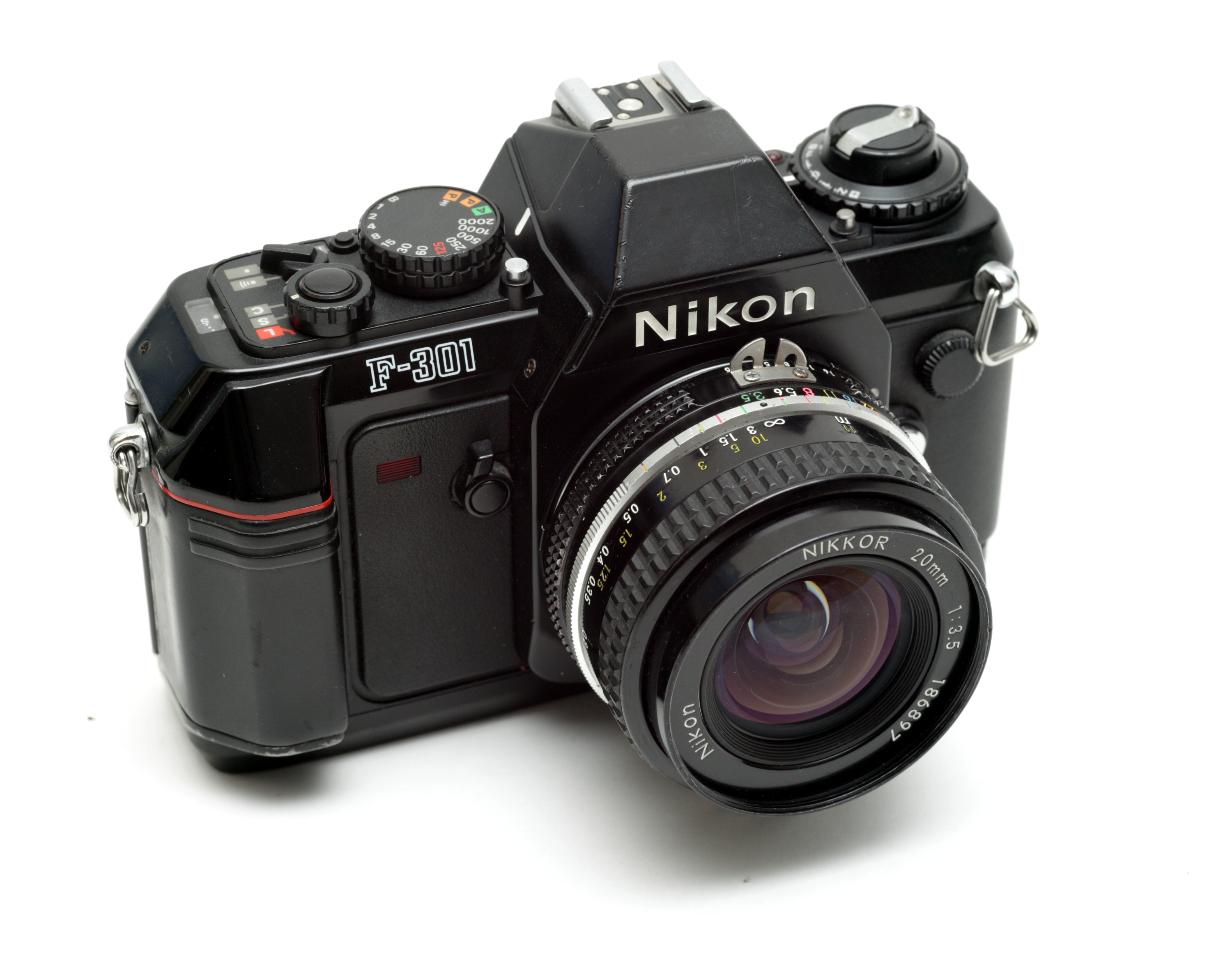
A Nikon F-301 with MB-3 AA battery pack

The Nikon F-301 (sold in the United States as the N2000) is a manual focus, 35 mm SLR camera sold by the Nikon Corporation beginning in 1985. It replaced the FG. It is functionally very similar to the Nikon F-501 (sold in North America as the N2020), but without autofocus.

The F-301 is the first consumer-level Nikon SLR with an integral motor drive. The motor advances the film at a rate of 2.5 frames a second in continuous exposure mode. Although the F-301's motor can automatically load film, the camera still requires the user to manually rewind the film at the end of a roll. On a physical level the F-301 is also the first Nikon to make extensive use of polycarbonates.

The F-301 is the first Nikon SLR to feature DX film decoding. It is also one of only four Nikon SLRs with native support for the advanced exposure modes of Nikon's contemporary AI-S lenses, along with the Nikon FA, Nikon F-501, and Nikon F4. As a consequence the exposure modes include program and high-speed program autoexposure.

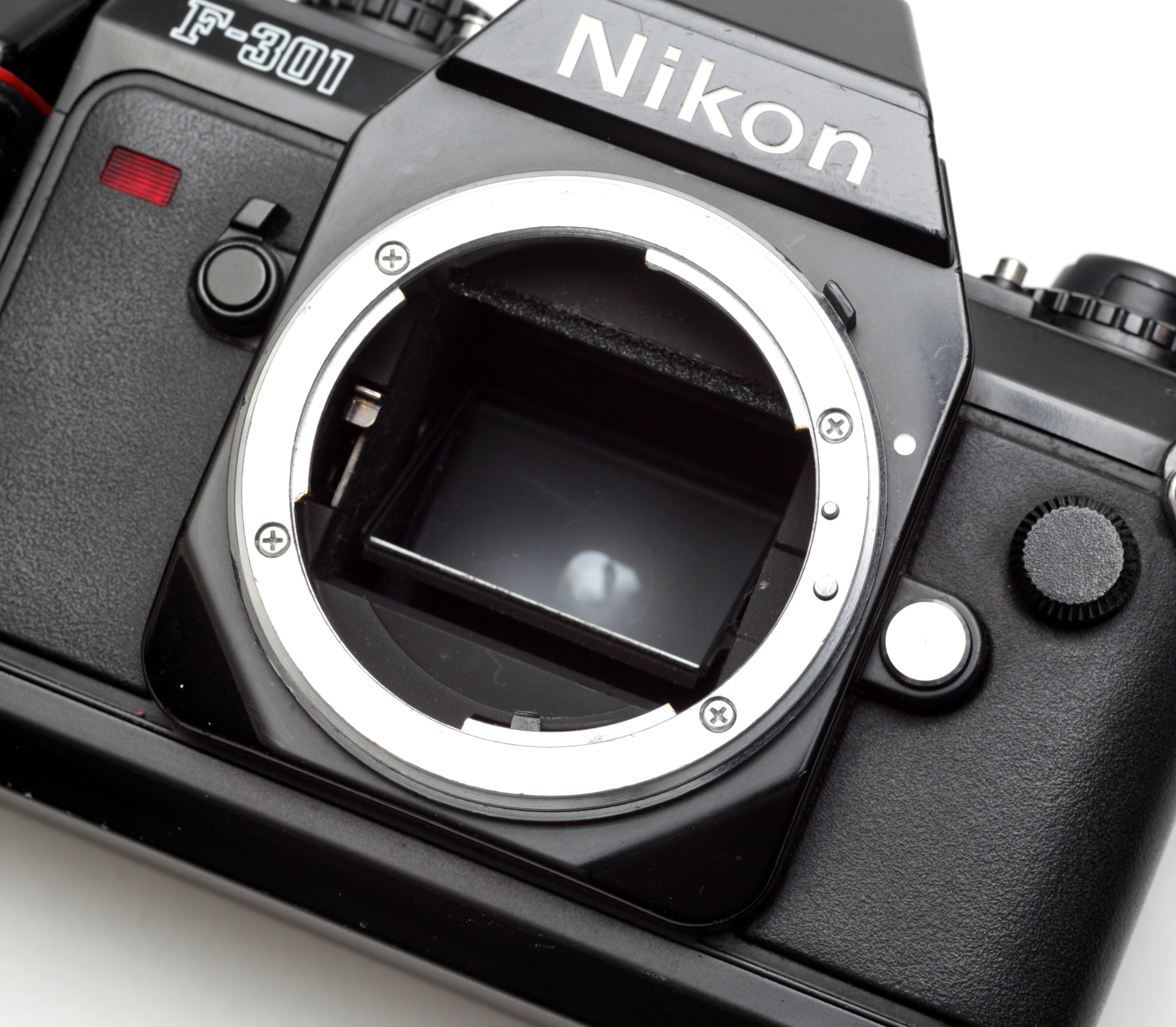
The F-301's lens mount, showing the AI-S detection pin

A standard hotshoe flash mount sits above the viewfinder. The F-301 has native support for the automatic TTL with the Nikon Speedlight SB-16B. The Nikon F-301 does not feature a built-in pop-up flash (the F-401 was the first Nikon SLR to have this feature).

This camera is powered by four AAA batteries, loaded from below, necessitating removal of the baseplate. A MB-3 battery pack can be used instead of the standard MB-4 enabling AA batteries to be used instead. The placement of the batteries means that the tripod bush on the baseplate is extremely offset from the centre of the camera. The AH-3 tripod adapter can be used to rectify this though it adds extra bulk to the camera.

The F-301 can be manually preset for film speeds from ISO 12 to ISO 3200, or this can be left to the camera through the DX feature.

Class	1950s					1960s										1970s										1980s										1990s										2000s										2020s			
Class	55	56	57	58	59	60	61	62	63	64	65	66	67	68	69	70	71	72	73	74	75	76	77	78	79	80	81	82	83	84	85	86	87	88	89	90	91	92	93	94	95	96	97	98	99	00	01	02	03	04	05	06	07	08	09	...	20	21	22
Professional					F																					F3																																	
Professional																	F2												F3AF					F4								F5								F6									
High-end																													FA					F-801 (N8008)/ F-801s (N8008s)				F90 (N90)		F90X (N90s)					F100														
Mid-range																																F-501 (N2020)				F-601 (N6006)				F70 (N70)						F80 (N80)													
Mid-range																		EL / EL2 /ELW						FE					FE2							F-601M (N6000)				F70 (N70)						F80 (N80)													
Mid-range											FT		FTn/ FT2/ FT3										FM					FM2																			FM3A												
Mid-range											FS												FM					FM2																			FM3A												
Entry-level																																																											
Entry-level																																										Pronea S																	
Entry-level																																									Pronea 600i/6i																		
Entry-level								Nikkorex F / Nikkor J																	EM			FG			F-301 (N2000)				F-401s (N4004s)					F50 (N50)							F65 (N65 / U)		F75 (N75 / U2)										
Entry-level						35		35 II		Auto 35																				FG-20			F-401 (N4004)				F-401x (N5005)								F60 (N60)			F55 (N55)											
Entry-level									Zoom 35																																FM10 / FE10																		
Class	55	56	57	58	59	60	61	62	63	64	65	66	67	68	69	70	71	72	73	74	75	76	77	78	79	80	81	82	83	84	85	86	87	88	89	90	91	92	93	94	95	96	97	98	99	00	01	02	03	04	05	06	07	08	09	...	20	21	22
Class	1950s					1960s										1970s										1980s										1990s										2000s										2020s			
