= Nikon F-801 =

35mm SLR camera

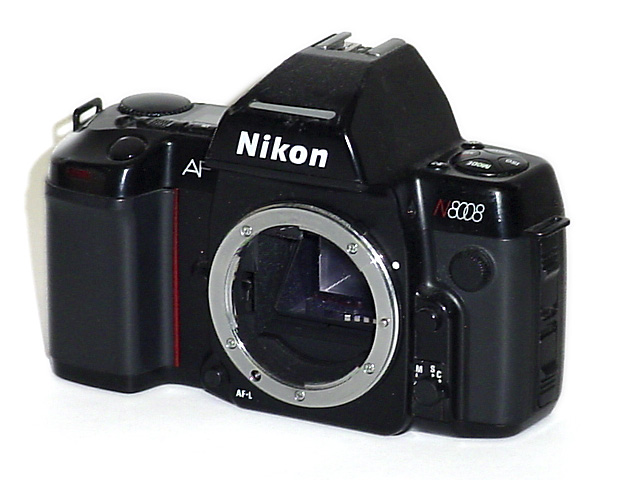
Nikon N8008 front view

The Nikon F-801 (sold as the N8008 in the US market) is a 35mm SLR released worldwide in June 1988 and manufactured until 1991, when it was replaced by the improved Nikon F-801s (N8008s in the US), which in turn was discontinued in early 1995. Although its autofocus mechanism is slow in comparison to modern standards, it was an improvement on Nikon's first attempt at an autofocus SLR - the F-501 (N2020 in North America), and proved to be reliable and durable, typical of Nikon's cameras.

== Features ==
Despite being designated in the number range usually reserved for amateur cameras (indicated by the non-single digit after the F, eg. not F3), the F-801 was built to a high standard and incorporated a number of professional features:

- A Depth of Field preview button allows temporary stopping down to the shooting aperture to check DOF.
- A Multiple Exposure facility allows up to nine shots within one frame.
- A unique 'two shot' self-timer. This allowed a second shot to be taken by the self-timer a couple of seconds after the first, giving a more 'relaxed' and unposed picture.
- Fully programmed automatic exposure, Aperture priority, Shutter priority and fully manual exposure control.
- 30-second to 1/8000-second shutter speed range with bulb mode.
- Film-speed setting from DX code or by manual override (ISO 6 to 6400).
- 1/250-sec. flash synchronisation.
- Evaluative 2D Matrix and 75% Centre-Weighted Average metering modes.
- Compatibility with the Nikon Multi-Control Back MF-21, allowing freeze-focus, data imprinting, and automatic exposure bracketing.

== Compatibility ==
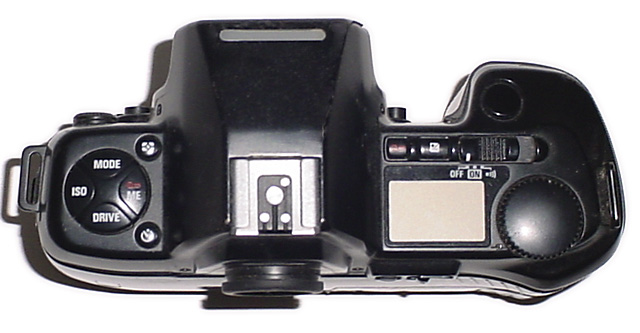
Nikon N8008 top panel View

Like the Nikon F4, the F-801 is broadly compatible with most Nikon AI and AF F-mount lenses, though some features are unavailable depending on the lens type. All features are available when used with AF-type lenses. Non-CPU (AI and AI-S) lenses are supported, but only Manual and Aperture-Priority exposure programs are available, using centre-weighted metering. Autofocus is not supported with AF-I and AF-S lenses, and Vibration Reduction (VR) is not available regardless of the lens. Newer G-type lenses are usable with the Program and Shutter-Priority exposure programs (though it is possible to use them in Manual or Aperture-Priority programs, but only at minimum aperture).

The F-801 continued the trend established by earlier Nikon cameras such as the F-301/N2000 and F-501/N2020 in not being provided with an ISO-standard cable release socket. Instead, all remote interaction with the camera is carried out via the two-pin remote terminal on the front of the body. One can use an ISO cable release with the body by purchasing a Terminal Release MR-3 and fitting it to the remote terminal.

Despite the camera's complexity (900 parts, two microcomputers, and eight ICs), both the F-801 (N8008) and its successor the F-801s (N8008s) enjoy a good reputation for robust performance and durability, a weak point of many mid-level AF SLR cameras.

== Related models ==
The F-801 provided a semi-professional autofocus successor to the manual-focus Nikon FE2 SLR, which had been manufactured until 1987. The success of the F-801 led to an updated version of this camera in 1991, which was designated the F-801S/N8008S. It had improved autofocus performance and incorporated spot metering, but retained the original model's reputation for reliability.

During the early 1990s, the F-801s sat at the top of the company's consumer range of autofocus cameras, which also included the F-401 and F-601. More advanced and expensive professional autofocus SLRs included the Nikon F4.

Class	1950s			1960s										1970s										1980s										1990s										2000s										2020s			
Class	57	58	59	60	61	62	63	64	65	66	67	68	69	70	71	72	73	74	75	76	77	78	79	80	81	82	83	84	85	86	87	88	89	90	91	92	93	94	95	96	97	98	99	00	01	02	03	04	05	06	07	08	09	...	20	21	22
Profes- sional			F																					F3																																	
Profes- sional															F2												F3AF					F4								F5								F6									
High- end																											FA					F-801 (N8008)/ F-801s (N8008s)				F90 (N90)		F90X (N90s)					F100														
Mid- range																														F-501 (N2020)				F-601 (N6006)				F70 (N70)						F80 (N80)													
Mid- range																EL / EL2 /ELW						FE					FE2							F-601M (N6000)				F70 (N70)						F80 (N80)													
Mid- range									FT		FTn/ FT2/ FT3										FM					FM2/FM2n																			FM3A												
Mid- range									FS												FM					FM2/FM2n																			FM3A												
Entry- level																																																									
Entry- level																																								Pronea 600i/6i																	
Entry- level																																										Pronea S															
Entry- level						Nikkorex F / Nikkor J																	EM			FG			F-301 (N2000)				F-401s (N4004s)					F50 (N50)							F65 (N65 / U)		F75 (N75 / U2)										
Entry- level				35		35 II		Auto 35																				FG-20			F-401 (N4004)				F-401x (N5005)								F60 (N60)			F55 (N55)											
Entry- level							Zoom 35																																FM10 / FE10																		
Class	57	58	59	60	61	62	63	64	65	66	67	68	69	70	71	72	73	74	75	76	77	78	79	80	81	82	83	84	85	86	87	88	89	90	91	92	93	94	95	96	97	98	99	00	01	02	03	04	05	06	07	08	09	...	20	21	22
Class	1950s			1960s										1970s										1980s										1990s										2000s										2020s			
