= Nikon F-601M =

1990 35mm single-lens reflex camera

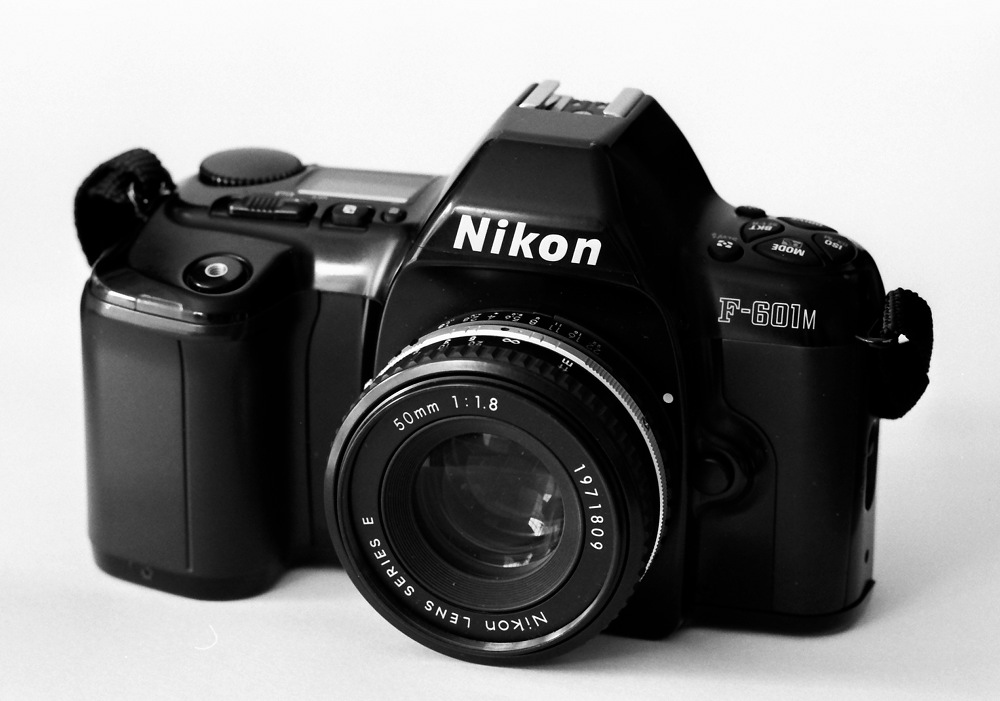

Overview
- Maker: Nikon
- Type: Single lens reflex

Sensor/medium
- Film format: 35mm (135) film, 36mm x 24mm
- Film speed: ISO 25-5000 (DX coded); ISO 6-6400 (manual)
- Film speed detection: Yes
- Recording medium: Film

Exposure/metering
- Exposure metering: 5 zone matrix or centre-weighted metering

Shutter
- Shutter: Electronically controlled vertical-travel focal plane
- Shutter speeds: 30s to 1/2000s, bulb

Viewfinder
- Optional viewfinders: fixed eye-level pentaprism
- Viewfinder magnification: 0.75x
- Frame coverage: 92%

General
- Battery: 6V lithium
- Dimensions: 154.5×96×65 mm (6.08×3.78×2.56 in)
- Weight: 565 g (20 oz) without battery pack

The Nikon F-601m (sold in USA as the N6000) is a manual focus, autoexposure, auto film loading and advancing 35 mm SLR camera manufactured by the Nikon Corporation and released in 1990.

The F-601m is a simplified version of the F-601, with no autofocus capability, no spot metering and no built-in flash.

== Features ==
- Flexible programmed (P), aperture priority (A) and shutter priority (S) auto-exposure and manual exposure control.
- Matrix and Center-Weighted Metering.
- Auto-exposure bracketing.
- Self-timer.
- High or low speed continuous film advance.
- DX film code recognition to automatically set ISO speed.
- Exposure and flash compensation.
- TTL flash exposure.

== Construction ==
- Polycarbonate (plastic) exterior.
- Metal lens mount.

== Lens Compatibility ==
- CPU lenses required for full compatibility.
- Manual focus lenses lose P & S modes, matrix metering, and aperture display in the finder
- Pre-AI and IX lenses not supported
- G-type lenses will work in P & S modes, and only smallest aperture in A & M modes.
- DX lenses will be vignetted, otherwise same as G-type
- VR functionality not supported

Class	1950s					1960s										1970s										1980s										1990s										2000s										2020s			
Class	55	56	57	58	59	60	61	62	63	64	65	66	67	68	69	70	71	72	73	74	75	76	77	78	79	80	81	82	83	84	85	86	87	88	89	90	91	92	93	94	95	96	97	98	99	00	01	02	03	04	05	06	07	08	09	...	20	21	22
Professional					F																					F3																																	
Professional																	F2												F3AF					F4								F5								F6									
High-end																													FA					F-801 (N8008)/ F-801s (N8008s)				F90 (N90)		F90X (N90s)					F100														
Mid-range																																F-501 (N2020)				F-601 (N6006)				F70 (N70)						F80 (N80)													
Mid-range																		EL / EL2 /ELW						FE					FE2							F-601M (N6000)				F70 (N70)						F80 (N80)													
Mid-range											FT		FTn/ FT2/ FT3										FM					FM2																			FM3A												
Mid-range											FS												FM					FM2																			FM3A												
Entry-level																																																											
Entry-level																																										Pronea S																	
Entry-level																																									Pronea 600i/6i																		
Entry-level								Nikkorex F / Nikkor J																	EM			FG			F-301 (N2000)				F-401s (N4004s)					F50 (N50)							F65 (N65 / U)		F75 (N75 / U2)										
Entry-level						35		35 II		Auto 35																				FG-20			F-401 (N4004)				F-401x (N5005)								F60 (N60)			F55 (N55)											
Entry-level									Zoom 35																																FM10 / FE10																		
Class	55	56	57	58	59	60	61	62	63	64	65	66	67	68	69	70	71	72	73	74	75	76	77	78	79	80	81	82	83	84	85	86	87	88	89	90	91	92	93	94	95	96	97	98	99	00	01	02	03	04	05	06	07	08	09	...	20	21	22
Class	1950s					1960s										1970s										1980s										1990s										2000s										2020s			
