= Nikon F3 =

1980 35mm single-lens reflex camera

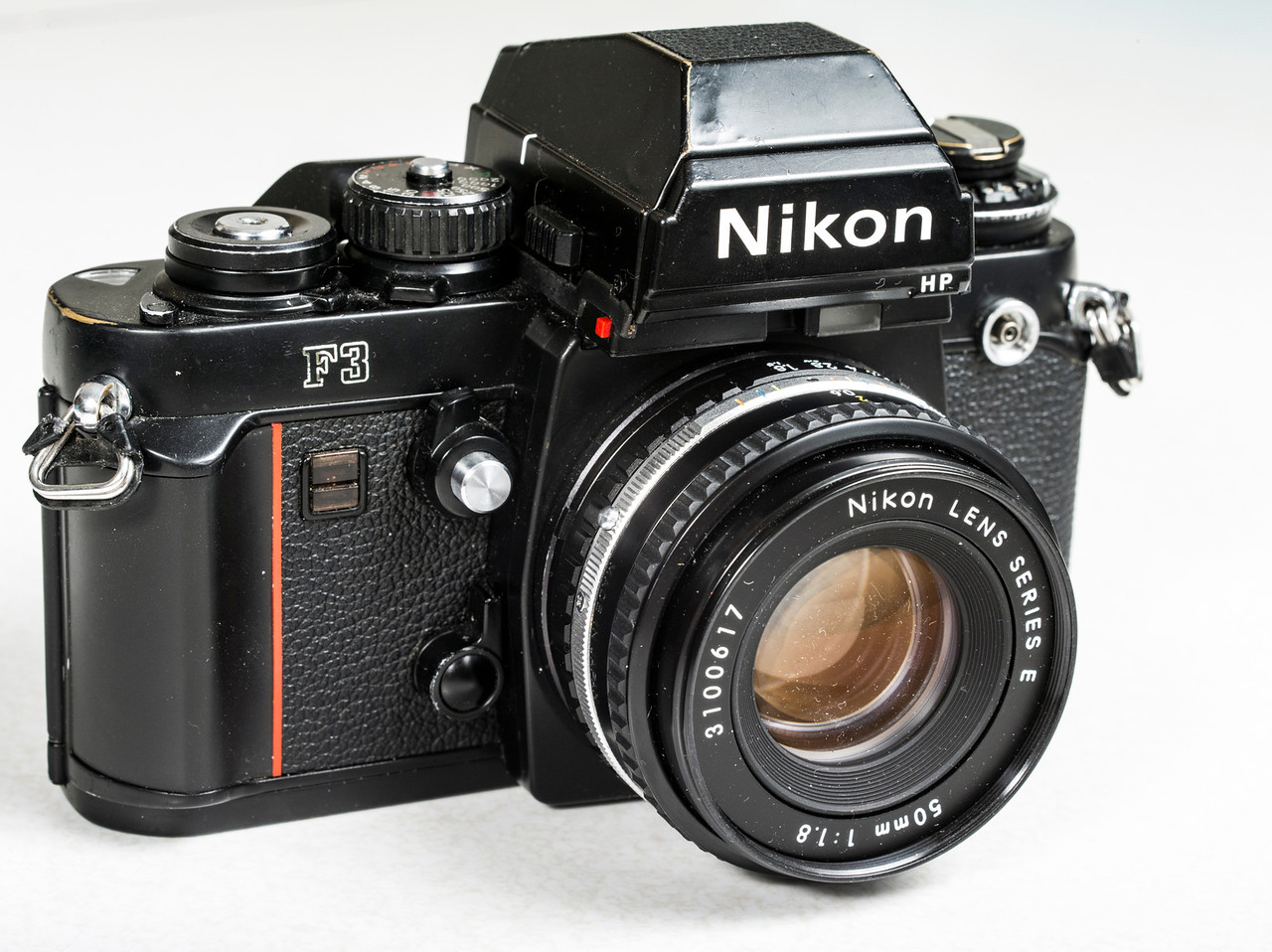

Overview
- Maker: Nikon (Nippon Kogaku K. K.)
- Type: 35mm SLR
- Released: March 1980
- Production: 1980-2001
- Intro price: $1,174.90 With 50mm Nikkor f/1.4 (1981)

Lens
- Lens mount: Nikon F-mount
- Compatible lenses: Nikon F-mount lenses supporting automatic indexing (AI) with some exceptions; F3 dedicated auto-focus lenses

Sensor/medium
- Film format: 35 mm
- Film size: 36 mm × 24 mm
- Film speed: ISO 12 - 6400
- Film advance: manual; automatic with optional motor drive
- Film rewind: manual; automatic with optional motor drive

Focusing
- Focus modes: manual

Exposure/metering
- Exposure modes: Aperture priority, manual
- Exposure metering: silicon photodiode light meter, TTL metering, EV 1 to EV 18 (f/1.4 at 1s to f/16 at 1/1000s at ASA/ISO 100 and with 50 mm f/1.4 lens
- Metering modes: 80 percent centerweighted

Flash
- Flash: hot shoe; synch terminal
- Flash synchronization: 1/80s
- Compatible flashes: Dedicated F3 accessory shoe mounted flashes with TTL capability; other hot shoe type flashes with adapter; non-hot shoe flashes with synch cord

Shutter
- Shutter: Electronic
- Shutter speed range: 8s - 1/2000s

Viewfinder
- Viewfinder: Interchangeable eye-level pentaprism

General
- Battery: 2x 1.5V LR44
- Made in: Japan

Chronology
- Successor: Nikon F4

The Nikon F3 is Nikon's third professional single-lens reflex camera body, preceded by the F and F2. Introduced in March 1980, it has manual and semi-automatic exposure control whereby the camera would select the correct shutter speed (aperture priority automation). The Nikon F3 series cameras has the most model variations of any Nikon F camera. It is also the first of numerous Nikon F-series cameras to be styled by Italian designer Giorgetto Giugiaro, and to include a red stripe on the handgrip – a feature that would later become (with variants of stripes and various other shapes) a signature feature of many Nikon cameras.

The F2AS was a current model when the F3 was introduced, and for a while both were sold concurrently. The earlier Nikons had developed such a sterling reputation for extreme ruggedness and durability that many Nikon F and F2 owners were initially reluctant to transition to the new F3 from the F2 series, particularly due to the new camera needing batteries to operate. The F3 was superseded by the F4 in 1988 and the F5 in 1996. Despite being superseded by the newer cameras, it remained in production through to 2001, with over 751,000 F3s produced through September 1992. It continues to be the longest running professional grade Nikon SLR. Long after production ceased, new bodies in boxes were available throughout the world, so an exact production number is not readily available.

== F3 variants ==
=== F3HP and F3/T ===
Initially, the F3 model with the DE-2 eye-level finder was introduced, soon followed by the popular F3HP, or High Point camera, with the DE-3 High Eyepoint prism/finder. The major advantage of this finder was that the entire viewfinder image could be seen from a distance of 2.5 cm from the viewfinder. This made the F3 more usable by those who wear glasses when shooting, or were forced to shoot in high-glare situations while wearing sunglasses. The only down-side to this was a smaller image through the viewfinder compared to the standard prism. With the exception of the "P" spec camera, all viewfinders are completely interchangeable. The F3 and F3HP retained the flash mount on the rewind dial, which (with flash mounted) obstructed that area of the camera.

A significantly more durable, robust titanium version of the F3HP was also offered, called the "F3/T", initially in a more natural titanium finish or 'champagne' coloring, and later in a less conspicuous black. It weighs 20 grams less than the comparable F3. The champagne offering was introduced in 1982 and was quickly discontinued around 1985, making it the rarer (and costlier on the used market) of the two titanium models. The F3/T featured titanium clad viewfinders (DE-4), titanium back, titanium top and bottom plates. It also benefited from the conformal coating of the internal circuit board. The mechanical specifications between the black finished F3/T and the natural finish F3/T were identical.

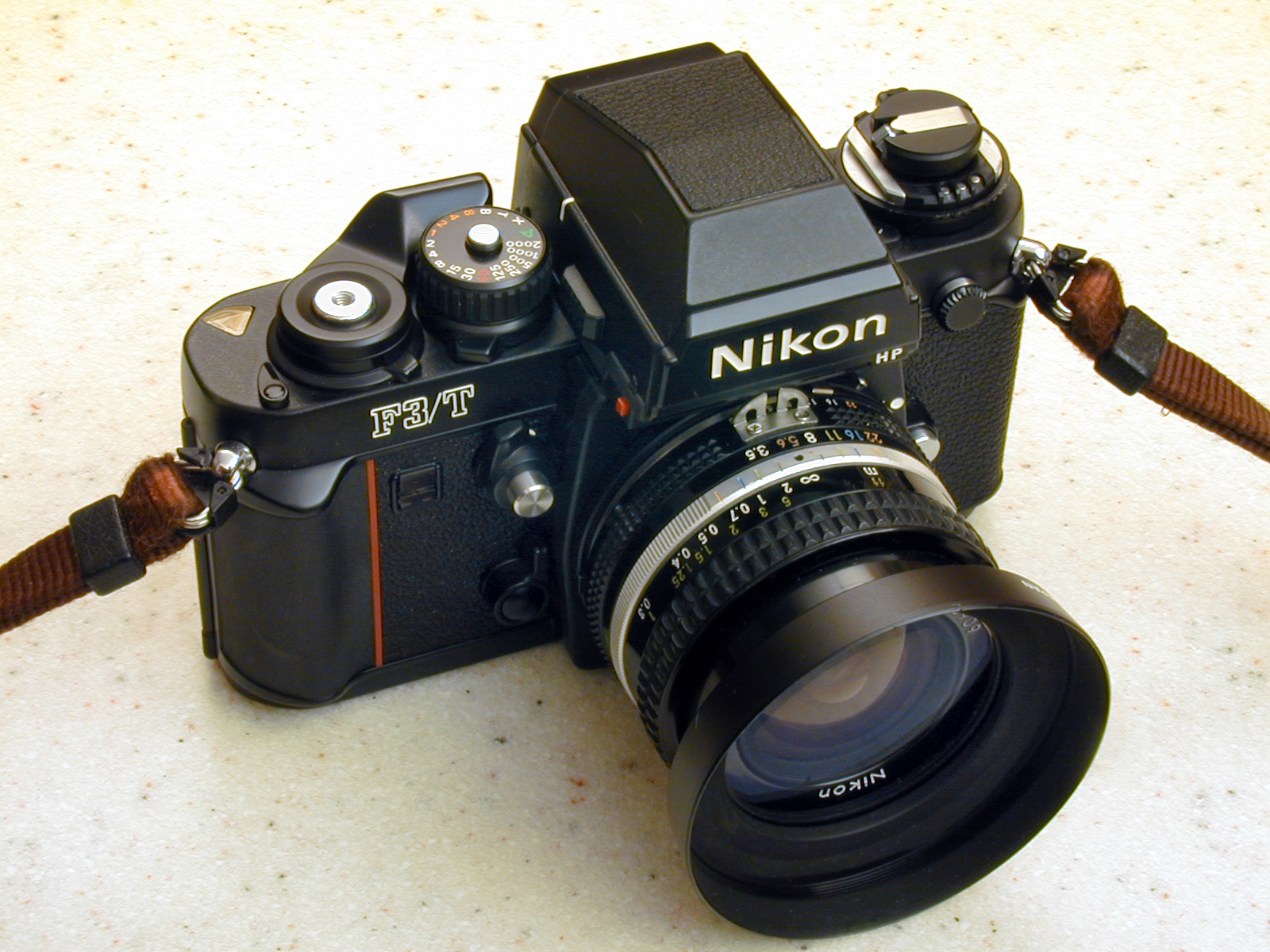
Nikon F3/T made of titanium

=== F3P ===
Next to be introduced was the F3P in 1983. Built primarily for use by photojournalists ("P"ress), the F3P included additional weathersealing, O-ring gaskets, the MF-6 Auto Film-Stop Back, Type-B Matte focusing screen, a modified Titanium DE-5 pentaprism with ISO-type accessory shoe and no eyepiece blind, rubber-covered waterproof shutter release with a modified lockout and no cable release threads, a round frame counter window with white numerals (some have been seen with blue numerals), and an extended shutter speed operating knob for easier operation in cold or wet environments. The F3P lacked a film door release lock, self-timer and multiple-exposure lever.

A variant of the F3P called the 'F3 Limited' was also sold just in Japan, starting in 1994. The Limited had special badging, regular film back without the auto-stop feature of the MF-6/6B back, and was otherwise identical to the F3P. It also came in a wooden presentation box.

Neither camera could use the DX-1 viewfinder of the F3AF body. Contacts in mirror housing were configured differently than a regular F3 series camera. On an F3P and F3 Limited, they were used for flash synch and ready light purposes. On an F3, F3/T, and F3AF, they were used to communicate the exposure meter display information to the LCD inside the DX-1 viewfinder.

=== F3H ===
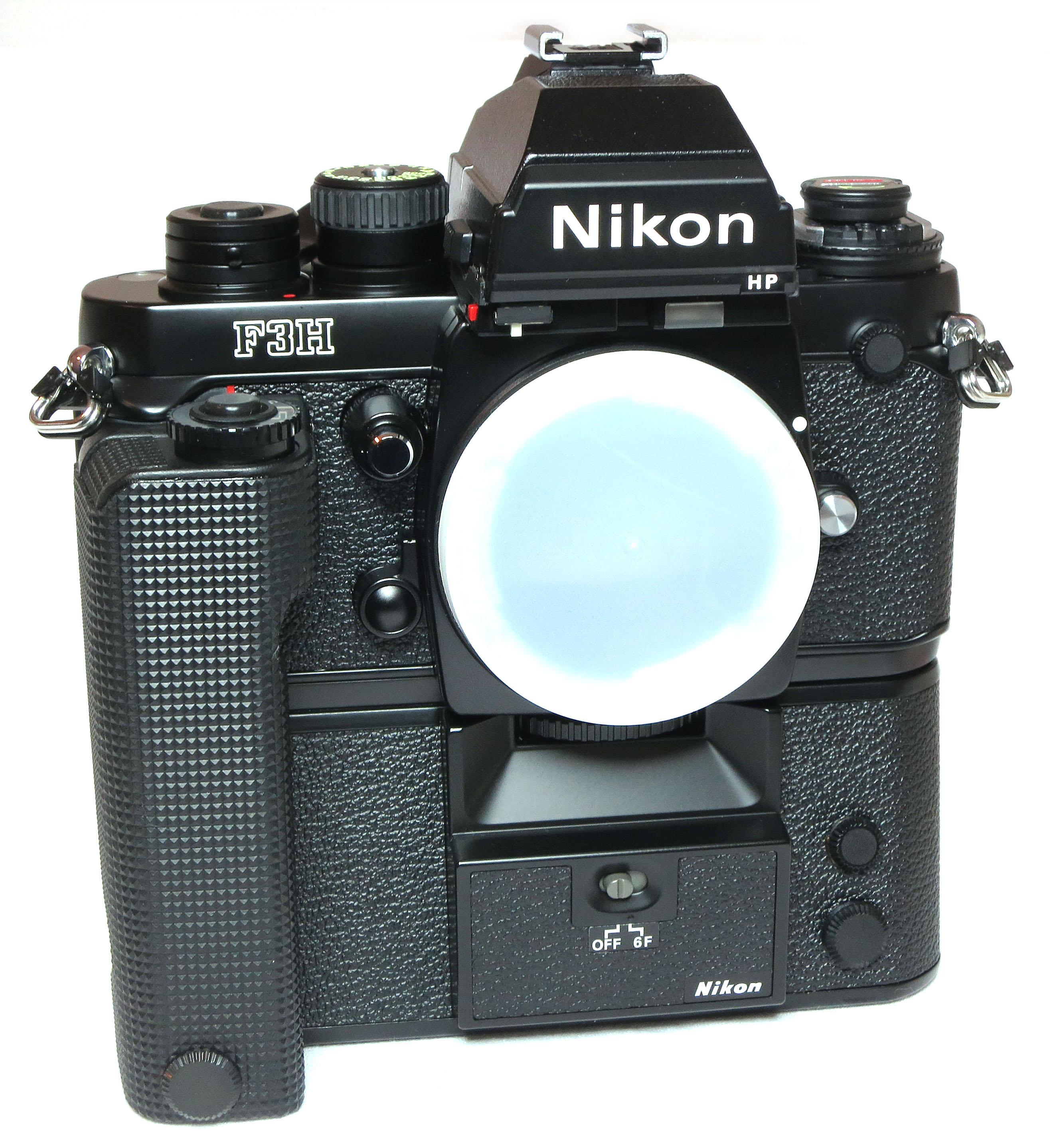
Nikon F3H High Speed 13 Frames per second

The F3H, a high-speed camera, was introduced for press, sports photography and for the 1998 Nagano Olympics in Japan. However, Nikon stated on its website in that it "represented Nikon's reaction to the fact that, the previous year, a competitor had released a camera for high-speed continuous shooting that could shoot 10 fps". Following previous practice with the Nikon F High Speed and the F2H, it featured a fixed pellicle semi-transparent mirror, diverting 30% of the light through to the view finder, allowing the camera and the specially produced MD-4H motor drive to achieve up to 13 frames per second, when the MN-2 nicad battery is used (as opposed to 7.5 frames per second with eight AA alkaline batteries).

The F3H had the appearance of an F3P modified for high-speed photography; however, under the skin were some advanced techniques to achieve the speeds required, including something Nikon have described as "the camera and the motor drive predict and control each other's operations, so that certain operations overlap".

The MD-4H was essentially a speeded-up MD4, with the gearing increased by 1.5 and the voltage raised to the standard, already capable, motor. There is one additional gold contact pin surrounding the rewind spigot, that joins with the electrical connection on the base of the camera. The front face of the drive features a slightly extended area with a switch that enables the option of using the drive at a constant 6 frames per second.

Production was short, official reports from Nikon claiming only around 100 such cameras made, however it is likely that the real number exceeds that by many hundreds, as serial numbers in the high 800's have been noted. Serial numbers on the camera body begin with H9600..., and the front features the signature F3 logo with a H added. Instead of the depth-of-field preview button, it had an extended version of the button which became an aperture opening button for composing purposes. Metering was done at working aperture, instead of wide-open, as on other F3 bodies. The camera is also unique among all F3's in having a white film take up spool. Like the F3P, the DX-1 viewfinder could not be used on it. When fitted with the MD-4H it is also incompatible with the Magazine Back MF-4 250, Firing Rate Converter MK-1 and Data Back MF-14.

It was the last specialized high speed film Nikon camera made and it remained the highest frame rate SLR (including digital) that Nikon made until the introduction of the Nikon D6, which achieves 14 frames per second with a reflex mirror. The camera is highly collectable, with limited numbers being produced and being the final in a line of the high speed cameras starting with the Nikon S3M.

=== F3AF ===
Finally there was the rarely seen 'F3AF', a model which included an autofocus (AF) pentaprism finder (DX-1) capable of autofocusing with two special AF Nikkor lenses—the first of their kind, which included focus motors in the lens bodies. Those lenses were the AF-80mm f/2.8 Nikkor and the AF-200mm f/3.5 Nikkor. It was the first autofocus camera to be produced by Nikon, in 1983.

However, even while the more successful subsequent Nikon AF design for the F4 and other models put the focus motor in the camera body, the F3AF's in-lens approach foreshadowed in-lens autofocus designs that would later come to dominate the market more than 15 years in the future, such as Canon's USM and Nikon's own Silent Wave Motor (SWM) lenses.

== Construction ==
Nikon abandoned the earlier mechanically operated shutter of the F2 for a modern, electronically controlled, horizontally traveled metal curtain design. The F3's shutter made use of a quartz timer for precise control of exposure duration. In automatic/aperture priority (A) mode, this meant that the shutter speed was fully "stepless": the duration of the exposure was not restricted to the discrete series of preset manual speeds listed on the shutter dial. In practice this meant that, in aperture priority mode, while the meter may read to the user as having selected 1/125 sec. for proper exposure, the actual speed output upon firing the shutter could be, say, 1/108 sec. depending on the precise value required by the scene. The quartz timer also ensured the exactness of shutter speeds selected manually by the user, unlike previous fully mechanical F cameras, in which the actual shutter duration could deviate slightly from the listed speed due to inherent physical properties of the mechanism. The new shutter proved to be equally reliable and less maintenance-intensive overall, though the decision to retain the horizontal-travel design significantly limited its top flash sync speed (1/80 sec.) compared to other Nikons, some of which used the Copal shutter. This decision forced many disappointed press photographers to use Nikon's semi-pro bodies (FM, FE, FM2, FE2, etc.) instead when higher sync speeds were needed, usually for fill flash in daylight situations. The F4 finally solved this sync speed deficiency with Nikon's pro-grade SLR offerings with its 250th sync. In contrast to the manually operated F2, the F3's electronic shutter required battery power to operate, although the camera included a small backup mechanical release lever that tripped the shutter at 1/60 sec.

The F3 continued the high quality of its predecessors, in some ways surpassing it. Tolerances were exacting, and typically Nikon – just enough for operation of the camera (with a small allowance for debris), yet not enough to inhibit cold-weather operation at temperatures where lubricants begin to gel. Only the finest quality mechanical and electronic parts were selected, and Nikon insisted that all electronic components be sourced with a guarantee of 20 years of continued supply. Not only did the F3 use ball-bearings to mount its shutter and film transport mechanisms, but additional clusters of bearings were added to the film advance to make one of the smoothest operating cameras ever built. Indeed, resistance is so low when operating the film advance that it is difficult to tell if there is film in the camera.

For the first time, shutter information was displayed via an internal liquid crystal display (LCD) inside the viewfinder. Aperture information was relayed through Nikon's "ADR" (Aperture Direct Readout) which was a window at the top center of the viewfinder that got its information from a micro-prism that read small numbers at the top of the mounted lens, of which type 'AI' (Aperture Indexing) or 'AIS' (Aperture Indexing Shutter Priority) lenses had printed behind the normal aperture numbers. Though widely used today, LCDs were very hi-tech at the time. They proved somewhat difficult to see at night, so Nikon installed a button-operated light for use at night. The LCD is one of the few problem areas of the F3 design, since with age, LCDs lose contrast, blur, and become inoperative after a number of years. Fortunately, unlike modern autofocus cameras with LCD 'Command Center' panels, malfunction of the F3's LCD viewfinder display does not prevent full operation of the camera, since this is accomplished with manual dials and indicators. Many F3 cameras built in the 1980s were never used professionally, and therefore are still in perfect working order, including the LCD. On early production models the autoexposure lock button, originally a simple push-in part, is often missing; Nikon later redesigned this part so it was securely attached from inside the body. The later part can be fitted to early bodies but a partial stripdown is required.

The Nikon F3 was the last in the Nikon series of manual-focus, professional level 35mm SLR cameras. Its production cycle is generally accepted to be from 1980 to 2000 or 2002, close to a record for a high-volume professional camera. Its successor – the F4 – along with operating the two F3AF lens, featured auto-focus and new optional metering and modes, but retained the ability to mount older manual-focus lenses. The F3 was also the last F-Series camera to be offered without an integrated motor drive, making the camera smaller overall than its successors in the F-Series. The lasting appeal of the F3 remains the same as it was at its inception – a precision tool for those who prefer a less complex, extremely well made camera for continual use in extreme environments.

The optional motor drive for the F3, known as the MD-4, contained either 8 AA batteries or a special NiCd battery pack that would be recharged. Its performance surpassed that of past Nikon models, with a capability of 4 frames per second with uninterrupted reflex viewing, or 6 frame/s with the reflex mirror locked up. The integral seamless design of the MD-4 motor drive made it an extremely popular option for many F3 users. A bulk film back could be fitted in lieu of the normal back to the F3. This film back, known as the MF-4, was capable of handling up to 10 meters (33 ft) of 35mm film, or 250 exposures.

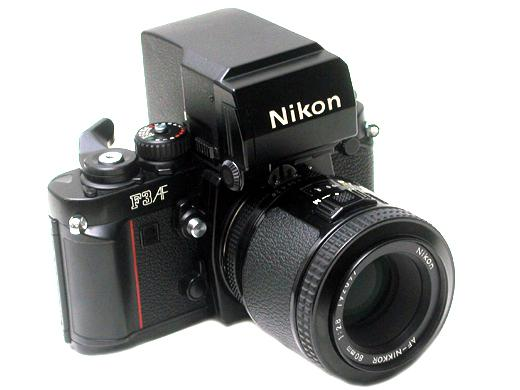
Nikon F3AF

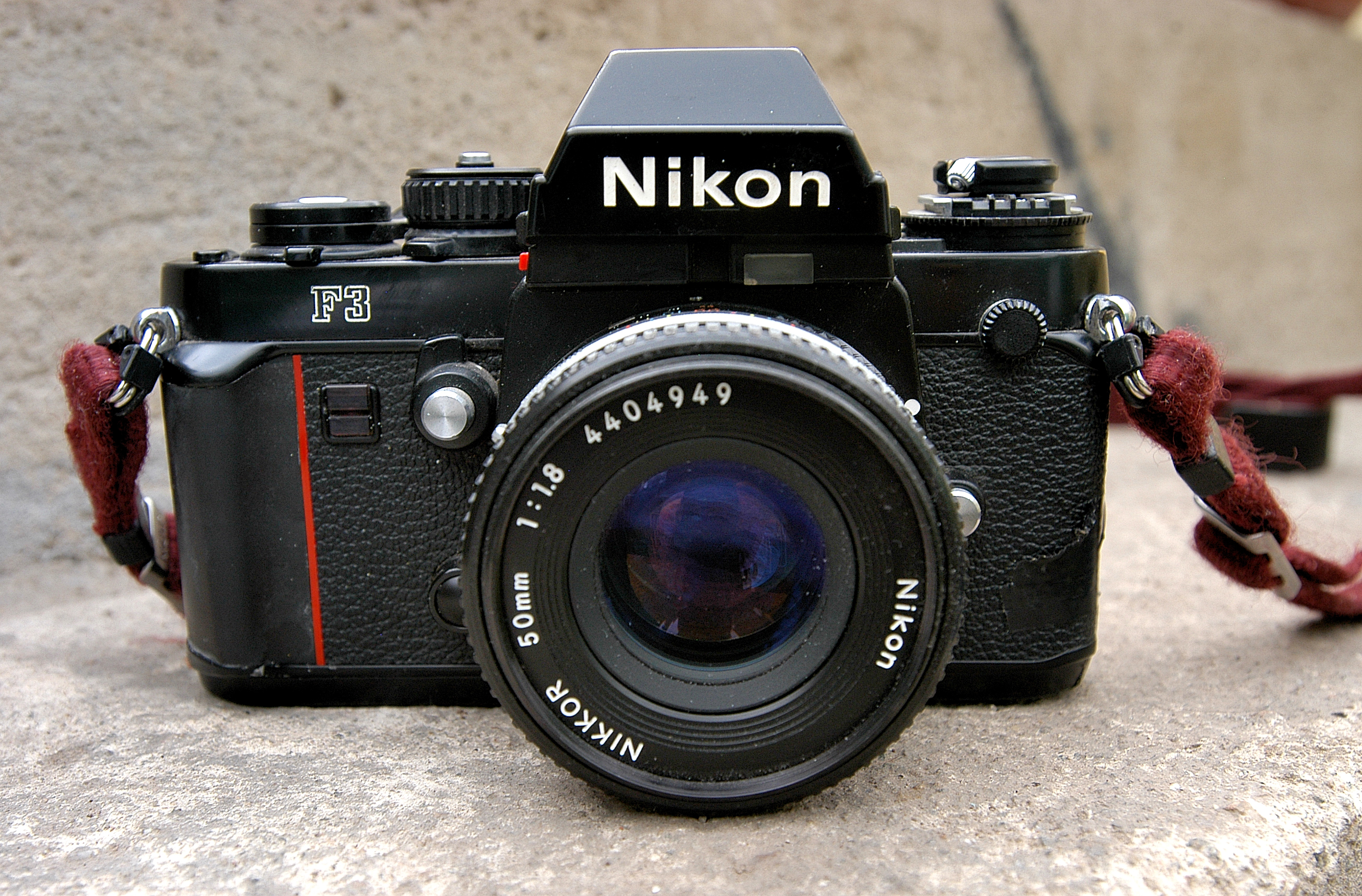
Nikon F3 with Nikkor 50mm f/1.8

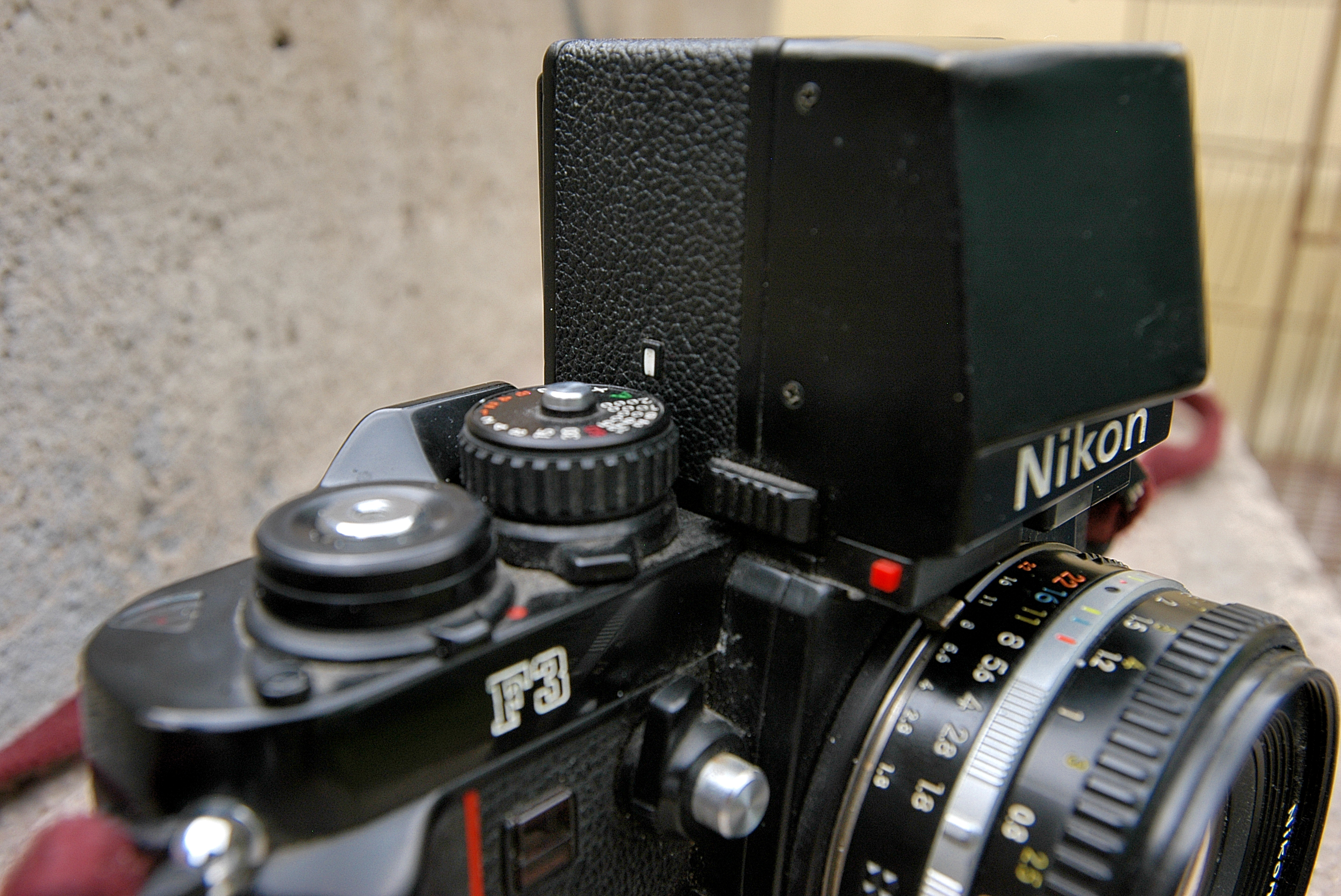
Nikon F3 with DA2 Sport Finder

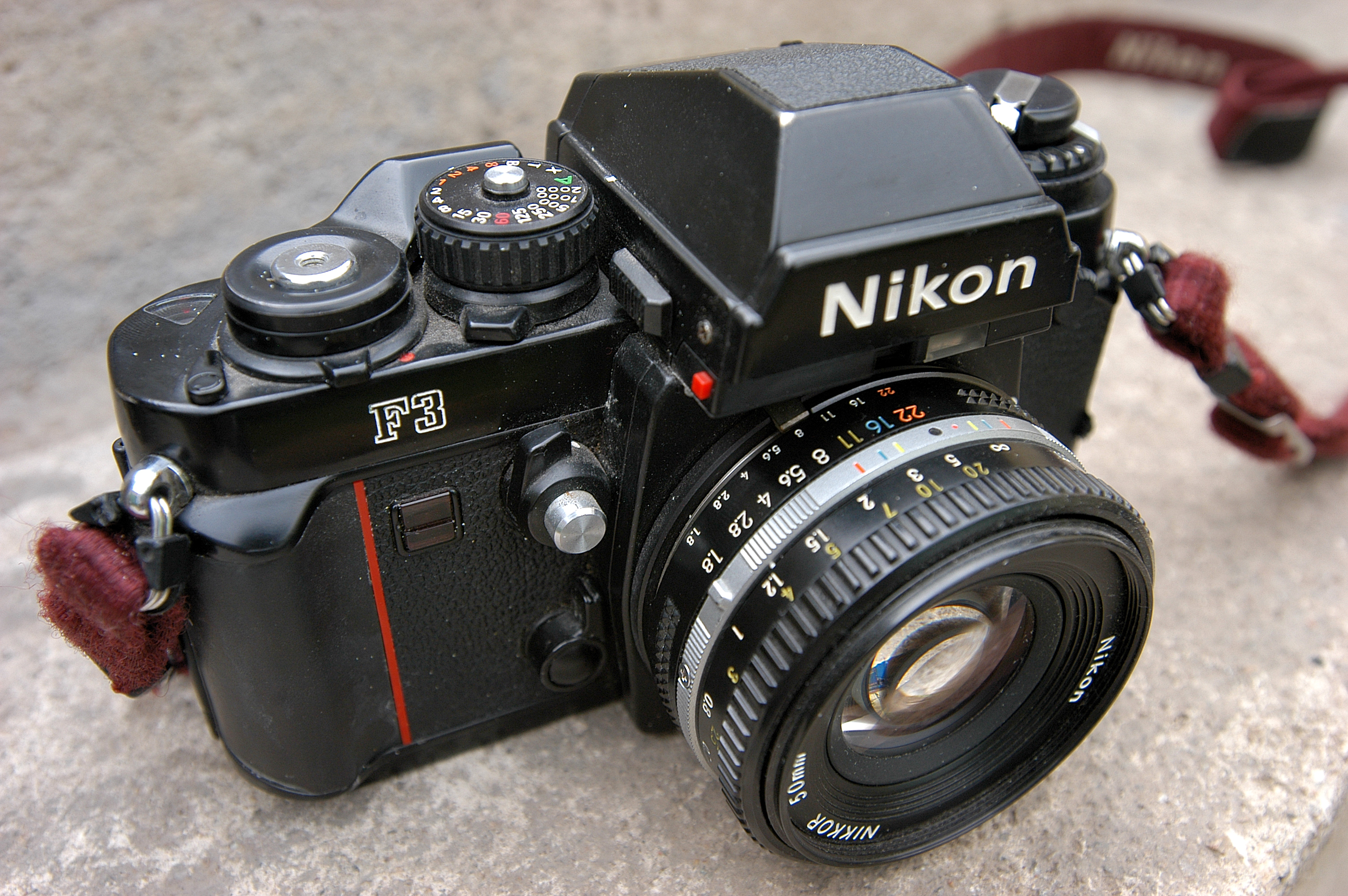
Nikon F3 buttons and knobs

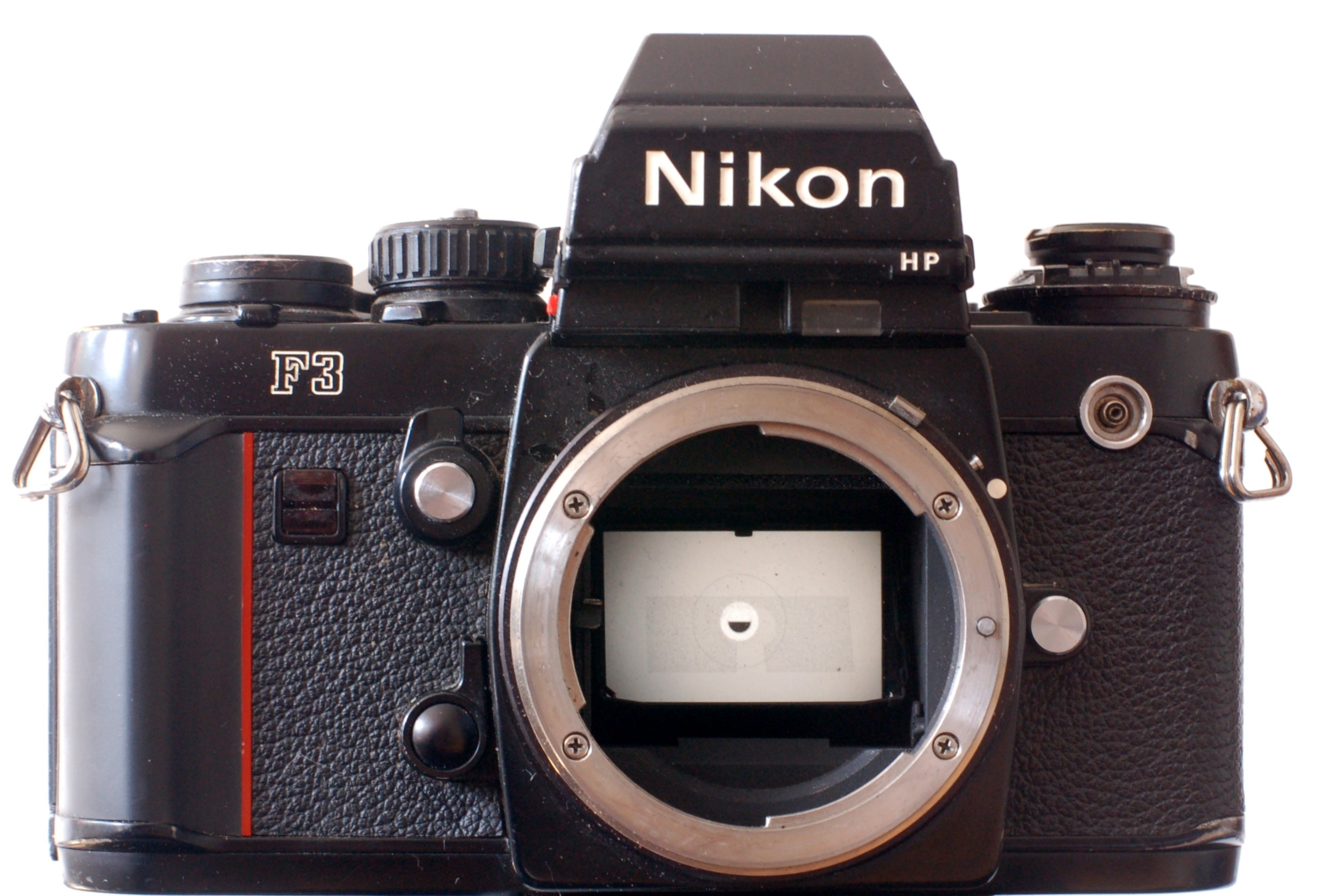
Nikon F3 HP

== See also ==
- Kodak DCS-100, an early digital DSLR system that used F3 bodies for photographic functions.

Class	1950s			1960s										1970s										1980s										1990s										2000s										2020s			
Class	57	58	59	60	61	62	63	64	65	66	67	68	69	70	71	72	73	74	75	76	77	78	79	80	81	82	83	84	85	86	87	88	89	90	91	92	93	94	95	96	97	98	99	00	01	02	03	04	05	06	07	08	09	...	20	21	22
Profes- sional			F																					F3																																	
Profes- sional															F2												F3AF					F4								F5								F6									
High- end																											FA					F-801 (N8008)/ F-801s (N8008s)				F90 (N90)		F90X (N90s)					F100														
Mid- range																														F-501 (N2020)				F-601 (N6006)				F70 (N70)						F80 (N80)													
Mid- range																EL / EL2 /ELW						FE					FE2							F-601M (N6000)				F70 (N70)						F80 (N80)													
Mid- range									FT		FTn/ FT2/ FT3										FM					FM2/FM2n																			FM3A												
Mid- range									FS												FM					FM2/FM2n																			FM3A												
Entry- level																																																									
Entry- level																																								Pronea 600i/6i																	
Entry- level																																										Pronea S															
Entry- level						Nikkorex F / Nikkor J																	EM			FG			F-301 (N2000)				F-401s (N4004s)					F50 (N50)							F65 (N65 / U)		F75 (N75 / U2)										
Entry- level				35		35 II		Auto 35																				FG-20			F-401 (N4004)				F-401x (N5005)								F60 (N60)			F55 (N55)											
Entry- level							Zoom 35																																FM10 / FE10																		
Class	57	58	59	60	61	62	63	64	65	66	67	68	69	70	71	72	73	74	75	76	77	78	79	80	81	82	83	84	85	86	87	88	89	90	91	92	93	94	95	96	97	98	99	00	01	02	03	04	05	06	07	08	09	...	20	21	22
Class	1950s			1960s										1970s										1980s										1990s										2000s										2020s			
