= Nikon F-401 =

35mm SLR camera

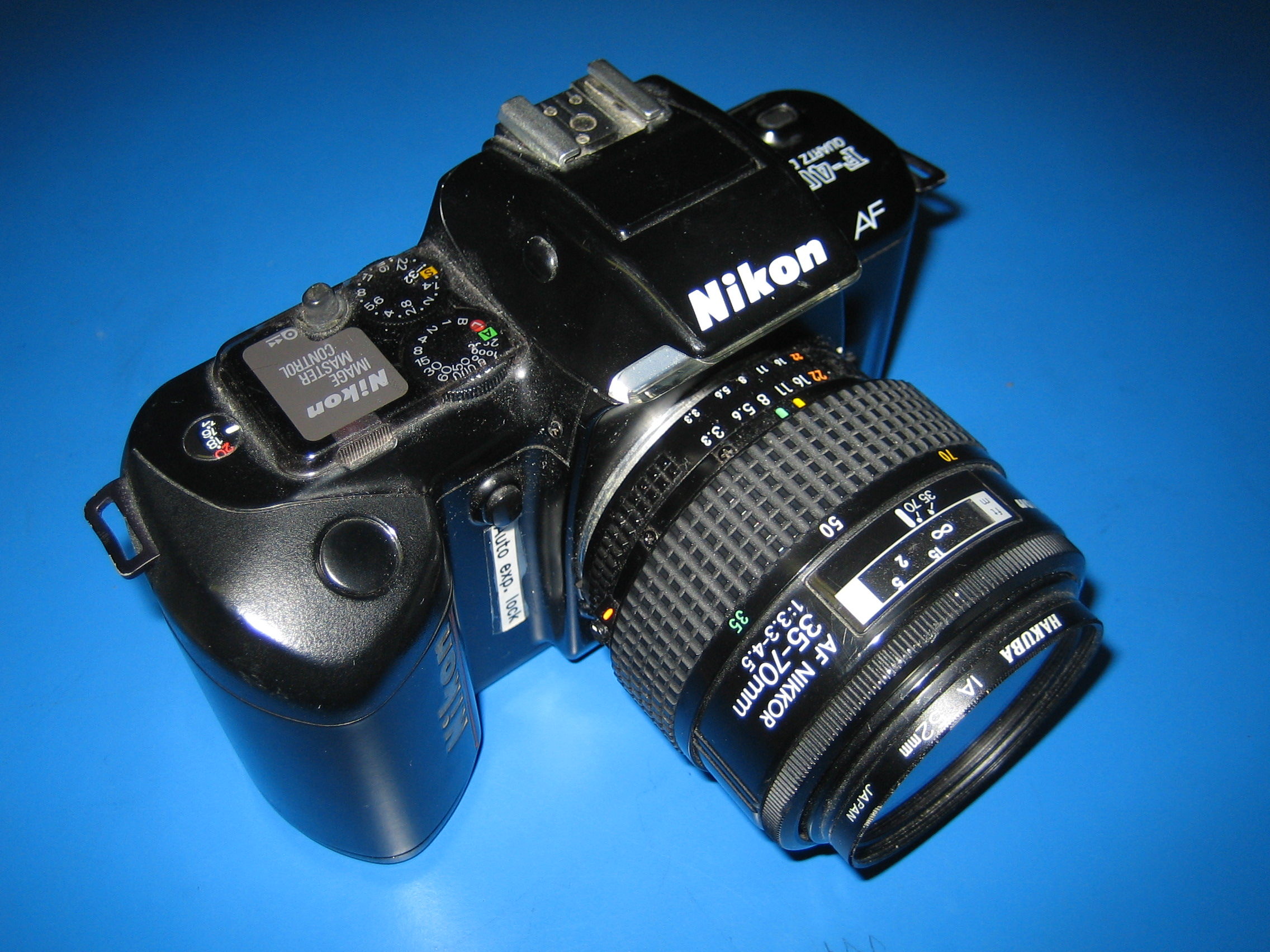
Nikon F-401.

The Nikon F-401 (N4004 in North America) was a beginner's level, autofocus, 35mm, single-lens reflex (SLR) film camera built by Nikon and introduced in 1987. The camera represented one of Nikon's first endeavours into consumer-based autofocus, as a follow-up to their first autofocus SLR in 1986, the Nikon F-501 (known as the N2020 in North America). The camera lacked many of the advanced features that more seasoned amateurs and professionals required, but it was a harbinger of the future as it included a pronounced, built-in grip as well as an integrated TTL Flash that is now commonplace on all but the most high-end SLR cameras.

The F-401 introduced the now common-place feature of using a thumbwheel instead of lens aperture ring to adjust the aperture. Furthermore, the camera's lack of support for AI lenses meant that while all previous Nikon lenses could be mounted to the camera, none supported automatic exposure TTL metering.

An upgraded version, the F-401S (also known as the N4004S) was released in April 1989. The F-401X (also known as the N5005) followed in September 1991.

By the 1990s, the F-401 was part of a lineup of autofocus consumer SLRs that included the more expensive Nikon F-601 and Nikon F-801.

Class	1950s			1960s										1970s										1980s										1990s										2000s										2020s			
Class	57	58	59	60	61	62	63	64	65	66	67	68	69	70	71	72	73	74	75	76	77	78	79	80	81	82	83	84	85	86	87	88	89	90	91	92	93	94	95	96	97	98	99	00	01	02	03	04	05	06	07	08	09	...	20	21	22
Profes- sional			F																					F3																																	
Profes- sional															F2												F3AF					F4								F5								F6									
High- end																											FA					F-801 (N8008)/ F-801s (N8008s)				F90 (N90)		F90X (N90s)					F100														
Mid- range																														F-501 (N2020)				F-601 (N6006)				F70 (N70)						F80 (N80)													
Mid- range																EL / EL2 /ELW						FE					FE2							F-601M (N6000)				F70 (N70)						F80 (N80)													
Mid- range									FT		FTn/ FT2/ FT3										FM					FM2/FM2n																			FM3A												
Mid- range									FS												FM					FM2/FM2n																			FM3A												
Entry- level																																																									
Entry- level																																								Pronea 600i/6i																	
Entry- level																																										Pronea S															
Entry- level						Nikkorex F / Nikkor J																	EM			FG			F-301 (N2000)				F-401s (N4004s)					F50 (N50)							F65 (N65 / U)		F75 (N75 / U2)										
Entry- level				35		35 II		Auto 35																				FG-20			F-401 (N4004)				F-401x (N5005)								F60 (N60)			F55 (N55)											
Entry- level							Zoom 35																																FM10 / FE10																		
Class	57	58	59	60	61	62	63	64	65	66	67	68	69	70	71	72	73	74	75	76	77	78	79	80	81	82	83	84	85	86	87	88	89	90	91	92	93	94	95	96	97	98	99	00	01	02	03	04	05	06	07	08	09	...	20	21	22
Class	1950s			1960s										1970s										1980s										1990s										2000s										2020s			
