= Fuji GS645 =

Fujifilm camera

The Fuji GS645 series was a lineup of cameras manufactured by Fujifilm of Japan. The lineup included several cameras, differentiated by their focal length and by some cosmetic features: The GS645, GS645W, and GS645S. The cameras, released between March 1983 and October 1984, are medium format and accept either 120 or 220 film. The cameras take photographs in the 6 × 4.5 frame size in portrait orientation.

== History ==
The initial model in the lineup, the GS645, is designed with a bellows system that has been compared as returning to Fujifilm's original roots in bellows-style medium format camera design.

A similar camera lineup released soon after, the Fuji GA645 series, also has a rangefinder design but offers autofocus.

== Models ==
There are three models in the GS645 line. The first camera introduced was the Fuji GS645. This camera is a folding camera with bellows, and a normal EBC Fujinon S 75mm f/3.4 lens. The Fuji GS645W was released soon after, which removed the bellows system in favor of a wider, fixed-in-place 45mm f/5.6 lens. A third version, the Fuji GS645S, was later released with a 60mm f/4.0 lens, designed for use photographing family settings, which has been compared to the Holga 120 because of its size and focal length. The GS645S includes a “brush bar” around the lens to protect it from damage.

All three models take photographs in portrait orientation and include a built-in battery powered light meter. They also can accept either 120 or 220 film. All models have a fully mechanical operation, meaning they can be used without a battery. Only the GS645 and GS645S have rangefinder focusing mechanisms, while the GS645W can only be used with zone focus.

The cameras have received some criticism for their fragility, though their form factor and the quality of the lenses has received praise.

== Specifications ==
Fuji GS645 series specifications
	GS645	GS645W	GS645S
Image			
Lens	75mm f/3.4	45mm f/5.6	60mm f/4.0
Aperture	f/3.4-22	f/5.6-22	f/4.0-22
Shutter	1s~1/500s, leaf		
Focusing	1 m (3.3 ft)–∞, rangefinder	1 m (3.3 ft)–∞, scale focusing	1 m (3.3 ft)–∞, rangefinder
Exposure	manual		
Weight	820 g 29 oz	680 g 24 oz	766 g 27.0 oz
Dimensions	147 mm × 114 mm × 56 mm 5.8 in × 4.5 in × 2.2 in (folded) 147 mm × 114 mm × 122 mm 5.8 in × 4.5 in × 4.8 in (expanded)	147 mm × 114 mm × 76 mm 5.8 in × 4.5 in × 3.0 in	147 mm × 114 mm × 90 mm 5.8 in × 4.5 in × 3.5 in
Introduced	March 1983	October 1983	October 1984
Model	foldable	not foldable	not foldable
