= Nikon F-601 =

35mm SLR camera

Nikon F-601 (N6006)
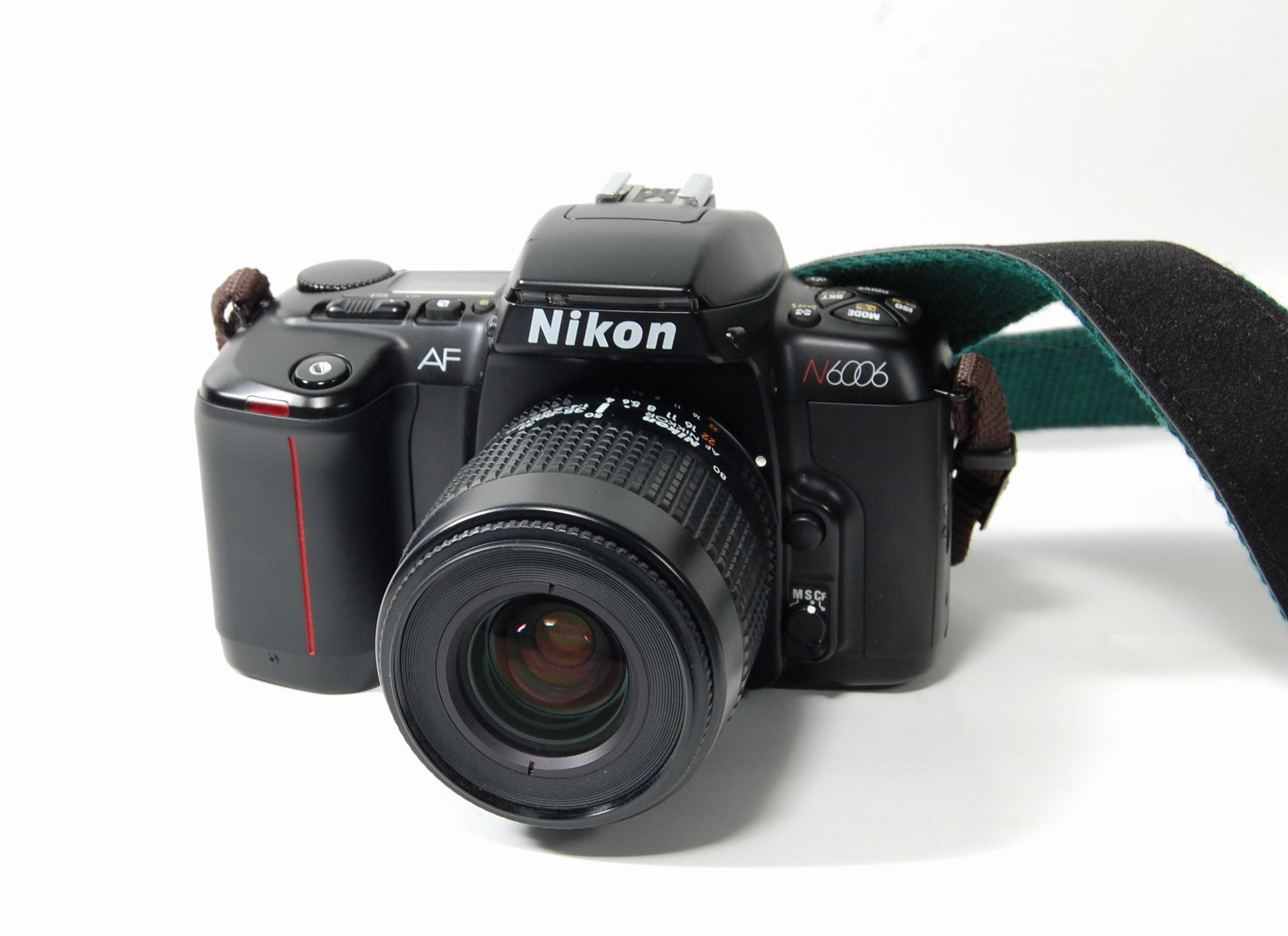

Overview
- Maker: Nikon
- Type: 35mm SLR

Lens
- Lens mount: Nikon F-mount

Focusing
- Focus: TTL Phase Detection Autofocus (1 zone)

Exposure/metering
- Exposure: Spot, Center-weighted, or Matrix

Shutter
- Frame rate: 2 frame/s

The Nikon F-601, otherwise known as the Nikon N6006, is a 35mm single-lens reflex (SLR) film camera that was produced by Nikon starting in 1990. The F601 featured an improved second-generation autofocus system, motor drive for automatic film advance, a built-in pop-up electronic flash, a top shutter speed of 1/2000 of a second, and a new "Matrix" evaluative multi-zone metering program.

The camera includes an integrated motor drive and is also available in a version with a date back, which could be set to print the date and time on the photo film as images were acquired. As a kit, the F601 shipped with a 35-to-70 mm autofocus Nikkor zoom lens. It is compatible with a wide range of Nikon F-mount lenses, including both autofocus and manual focus types. However, Nikon's older, non-AI modified lenses will not mount without modification. Doing so forcefully may damage the indexing pin on the body. Due to a firmware defect, G-type lenses without an aperture ring are compatible (in program and shutter priority modes) only if the aperture ring position sensor is manually actuated to its maximum position, therefore their use is not endorsed by Nikon.

During the 1990s, the F-601 sat between the Nikon F-401 and Nikon F-801s in the company's consumer SLR range.

A version without autofocus or built-in flash was sold as the Nikon F-601M.

Class	1950s			1960s										1970s										1980s										1990s										2000s										2020s			
Class	57	58	59	60	61	62	63	64	65	66	67	68	69	70	71	72	73	74	75	76	77	78	79	80	81	82	83	84	85	86	87	88	89	90	91	92	93	94	95	96	97	98	99	00	01	02	03	04	05	06	07	08	09	...	20	21	22
Profes- sional			F																					F3																																	
Profes- sional															F2												F3AF					F4								F5								F6									
High- end																											FA					F-801 (N8008)/ F-801s (N8008s)				F90 (N90)		F90X (N90s)					F100														
Mid- range																														F-501 (N2020)				F-601 (N6006)				F70 (N70)						F80 (N80)													
Mid- range																EL / EL2 /ELW						FE					FE2							F-601M (N6000)				F70 (N70)						F80 (N80)													
Mid- range									FT		FTn/ FT2/ FT3										FM					FM2/FM2n																			FM3A												
Mid- range									FS												FM					FM2/FM2n																			FM3A												
Entry- level																																																									
Entry- level																																								Pronea 600i/6i																	
Entry- level																																										Pronea S															
Entry- level						Nikkorex F / Nikkor J																	EM			FG			F-301 (N2000)				F-401s (N4004s)					F50 (N50)							F65 (N65 / U)		F75 (N75 / U2)										
Entry- level				35		35 II		Auto 35																				FG-20			F-401 (N4004)				F-401x (N5005)								F60 (N60)			F55 (N55)											
Entry- level							Zoom 35																																FM10 / FE10																		
Class	57	58	59	60	61	62	63	64	65	66	67	68	69	70	71	72	73	74	75	76	77	78	79	80	81	82	83	84	85	86	87	88	89	90	91	92	93	94	95	96	97	98	99	00	01	02	03	04	05	06	07	08	09	...	20	21	22
Class	1950s			1960s										1970s										1980s										1990s										2000s										2020s			
