= Nikon F4 =

1988 35mm single-lens reflex camera

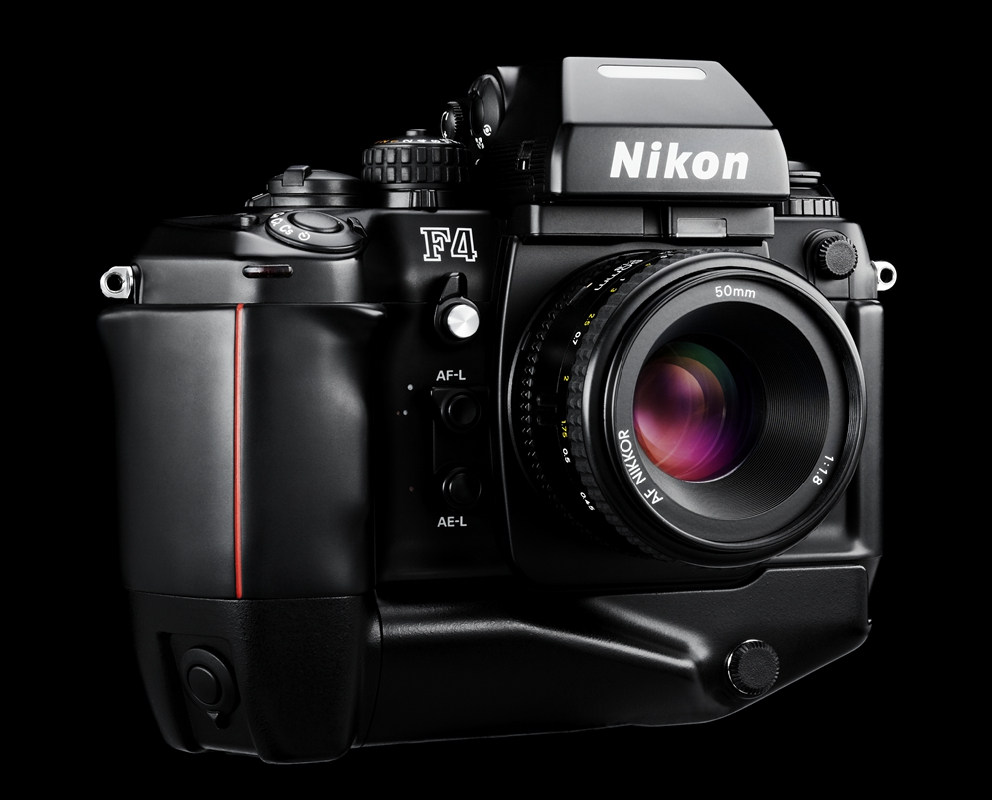
- Nikon F4 with a Battery Pack MB-21 (F4S)

Overview
- Maker: Nikon
- Type: 35mm SLR

Lens
- Lens mount: Nikon F-mount

Focusing
- Focus: TTL Phase Detection Autofocus (1 zone)

Exposure/metering
- Exposure: Program, shutter priority, aperture priority, manual 5 segment Matrix Metering

Chronology
- Successor: Nikon F5

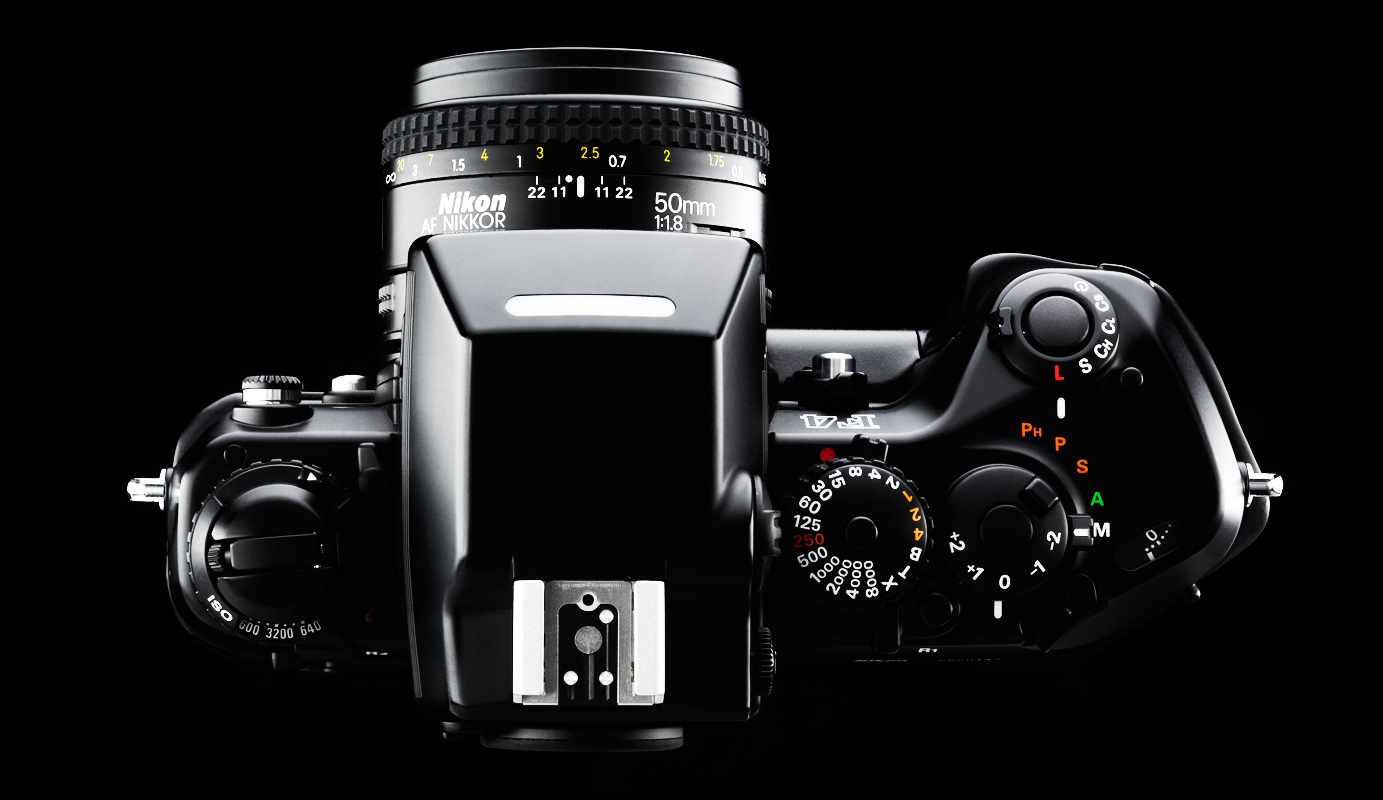
Nikon F4 top view

The Nikon F4 is a 35 mm autofocus (AF) single lens reflex (SLR) film camera, introduced in 1988 as the next generation in Nikon's line of F series professional cameras. With industrial design by Giorgetto Giugiaro, the F4 was the first professional Nikon to feature a practical autofocus system. The F4 is able to accept any of Nikon's manual focus (MF) or AF lenses from 1959 to the present day, including the two F3AF lenses (in Autofocus mode). The F4 succeeded the F3, a manual focus camera introduced in 1980 but outlasting the F4 as it stayed in production until 2001. Nikon introduced its next flagship model, the F5, in 1996. All F4 models were discontinued soon after, in May 1997.

== Features ==
The F4 introduced many Nikon owners to autofocus (as well as focus tracking), and was the first professional Nikon to utilize a vertical-travel metal-blade shutter (with shutter balancer to minimize noise and camera bounce). The shutter was a further developed Copal Square. As a fully electronic camera with motorized film transport (up to 5.7 frames per second), it required one of three available bottom-mounted battery packs to operate, using standard AA or rechargeable cells. For the first time on a Nikon SLR, two of those battery packs also offered an additional vertical shutter release button and grip for using the camera vertically.

Its controls were transitional between those of mechanical SLRs and future professional film and digital SLRs: the F4's electronics, LCD viewfinder display, autofocus, programmed auto-exposure, and matrix meter looked to the future, but it also retained classic dedicated analog dials for shutter speed, lens aperture, metering pattern, and exposure compensation.

The F4 was the first Nikon F-series lacking a manual film-advance lever, though it offered both motor-driven and manual film rewinding. Like previous F-series cameras, the F4 featured a high degree of customization to specific tasks, with various remote controls, film backs, and viewfinders available. While it was a complex camera with over 1700 parts, the F4's high-quality mechanical and electronic components, as well as weather sealing and tough construction, made for a reliable and long-lived professional SLR.

== Lens compatibility ==
A Nikon F4 with a 70-210mm lens.

The F4 will accept all autofocus lenses made for the F mount, as well all manual focus F mount lenses including very early invasive fisheye lenses. The meter coupling cam can be moved out of the way for use with lenses manufactured prior to 1977 (non-AI lenses). The F4 is one of the three film based Nikon cameras offering full Matrix metering with AI manual focus lenses.

Its lack of electronic aperture control limits the F4's functionality with G type lenses, which do not have an aperture ring. With these lenses, exposure control is limited to program and shutter-priority modes. In addition, DX lenses are not designed to cover the full 35mm frame and will vignette when used with the F4 (or any other 35mm camera). The F4 also provides no support for Nikon's later VR (Vibration Reduction) system; VR-equipped lenses will mount and function, but without image stabilization.

== Model line ==
Eventually Nikon had three F4 models that were distinguished by which integrated battery pack was attached. All F4 bodies are interchangeable with all battery packs. Therefore, none of the cameras includes a label for its particular model name—all use a simple "F4" nameplate:

model	battery pack	introduced	advance speed	batteries	features
F4	MB-20	1988	4.0 frame/s	4 AA	Most compact
F4S	MB-21	1988	5.7 frame/s	6 AA	Vertical shutter release
F4E	MB-23	1991	5.7 frame/s	6 AA or Ni-Cd (MN-20)	Largest pack, vertical shutter release, 250 exposure Bulk Film Multi-Control Back MF-24 terminal

== Nikon NASA F4 ==
The Nikon NASA F4 Electronic Still Camera was one of the first and rarest fully digital cameras. Constructed for NASA, it was used since 1991 on board the Space Shuttle. The camera was based on a modified F4 with standard F-mount and had a digital camera back with a monochrome CCD image sensor with 1024 x 1024 pixels on an area of 15 x 15mm.

== General references ==
- Nikon Corp (2005). "History." Retrieved May 1, 2005.
- Foo, Leo (2001). "Nikon F4 Series SLR models – Index Page." Retrieved May 1, 2005.
- Gandy, Stephen (August 8, 2004). "Nikon SLR Guide." Retrieved May 1, 2005.
- Wall, John N. "The Nikon F4 FAQ (Version 6.0)." Retrieved April 24, 2009.

Class	1950s					1960s										1970s										1980s										1990s										2000s										2020s			
Class	55	56	57	58	59	60	61	62	63	64	65	66	67	68	69	70	71	72	73	74	75	76	77	78	79	80	81	82	83	84	85	86	87	88	89	90	91	92	93	94	95	96	97	98	99	00	01	02	03	04	05	06	07	08	09	...	20	21	22
Professional					F																					F3																																	
Professional																	F2												F3AF					F4								F5								F6									
High-end																													FA					F-801 (N8008)/ F-801s (N8008s)				F90 (N90)		F90X (N90s)					F100														
Mid-range																																F-501 (N2020)				F-601 (N6006)				F70 (N70)						F80 (N80)													
Mid-range																		EL / EL2 /ELW						FE					FE2							F-601M (N6000)				F70 (N70)						F80 (N80)													
Mid-range											FT		FTn/ FT2/ FT3										FM					FM2																			FM3A												
Mid-range											FS												FM					FM2																			FM3A												
Entry-level																																																											
Entry-level																																										Pronea S																	
Entry-level																																									Pronea 600i/6i																		
Entry-level								Nikkorex F / Nikkor J																	EM			FG			F-301 (N2000)				F-401s (N4004s)					F50 (N50)							F65 (N65 / U)		F75 (N75 / U2)										
Entry-level						35		35 II		Auto 35																				FG-20			F-401 (N4004)				F-401x (N5005)								F60 (N60)			F55 (N55)											
Entry-level									Zoom 35																																FM10 / FE10																		
Class	55	56	57	58	59	60	61	62	63	64	65	66	67	68	69	70	71	72	73	74	75	76	77	78	79	80	81	82	83	84	85	86	87	88	89	90	91	92	93	94	95	96	97	98	99	00	01	02	03	04	05	06	07	08	09	...	20	21	22
Class	1950s					1960s										1970s										1980s										1990s										2000s										2020s			
