= F60 =

F60 or F.60 may refer to:

== Vehicles ==
=== Cars ===
- Ferrari F60, Ferrari's Formula One racing car for the 2009 season
- Ferrari F60 America, a limited production roadster derivative of the Ferrari F12 unveiled in 2014
- Enzo Ferrari (car), a Ferrari supercar sometimes referred to as the F60
- Second Generation Mini Countryman, codenamed F60

=== Conveyor Bridges ===
- Overburden Conveyor Bridge F60, a vehicle used for conveying overburden. It holds the record for the largest vehicle in terms of physical dimensions

=== Aeroplanes ===
- Farman F.60 Goliath, a 1919 French airliner
- Shenyang F60, a Chinese mid-size fifth generation fighter

== Other uses ==
- Nikon F60, an entry-level autofocus 35mm film SLR camera
