= F65 =

F65 or variant may refer to:

- HMS Tenby (F65), a Whitby-class frigate of the Royal Navy
- French frigate Aconit (F65)
- Nikon F65, a single-lens reflex camera
- Farman F.65, an airliner
- Sony F65, a digital motion picture camera
