= N55 =

N55 may refer to:

== Bus routes ==
- N55 (Long Island bus)
- London Buses route N55

== Roads ==
- N55 road (Ireland)
- Indus Highway, in Pakistan
- Romulo Highway, in the Philippines

== Other uses ==
- BMW N55, an automobile engine
- HMS Undaunted (N55), a submarine of the Royal Navy
- Jaluit Airport, on Jaluit Atoll, Marshall Islands
- Nikon N55, a camera
