= F75 =

F75 or F-75 may refer to:

- F-75 (food), a therapeutic milk product designed to treat severe malnutrition
- Daihatsu Rugger F75, the long wheelbase first generation model of the off-road vehicle built between 1984 and 1992
- HMS Charybdis (F75), a 1968 British Royal Navy Leander-class frigate
- HMS Eskimo (F75), a 1938 British Royal Navy Tribal-class destroyer
- HMS Mooltan (F75), a 1939 British Royal Navy armed merchant cruiser
- Nikon F75, an SLR camera
- Spanish frigate Extremadura F75, a 1972 Baleares-class frigate of the Spanish Navy
