= N65 =

N65 may refer to:

== Roads ==
- N65 highway (Philippines)
- N65 road (Ireland)
- Nebraska Highway 65, in the United States

== Other uses ==
- N65 (Long Island bus)
- Escadrille N65, a unit of the French Air Force
- HMS Salmon (N65), a S-class submarine of the Royal Navy sunk in 1940
- HMS Usk (N65), a U-class submarine of the Royal Navy sunk in 1941
- London Buses route N65
- Nikon N65, a camera
