= F55 =

F55 or F-55 may refer to:

- F55 (classification), a disability sport classification for people who compete in field events from a seated position
- HMS California (F55), an ocean liner requisitioned for the Royal Navy
- HMNZS Waikato (F-55), a Leander-class frigate of the Royal New Zealand Navy
- Nikon F55, a 2002 35mm film SLR autofocus camera
