= FinePix S1 Pro =

Digital camera model

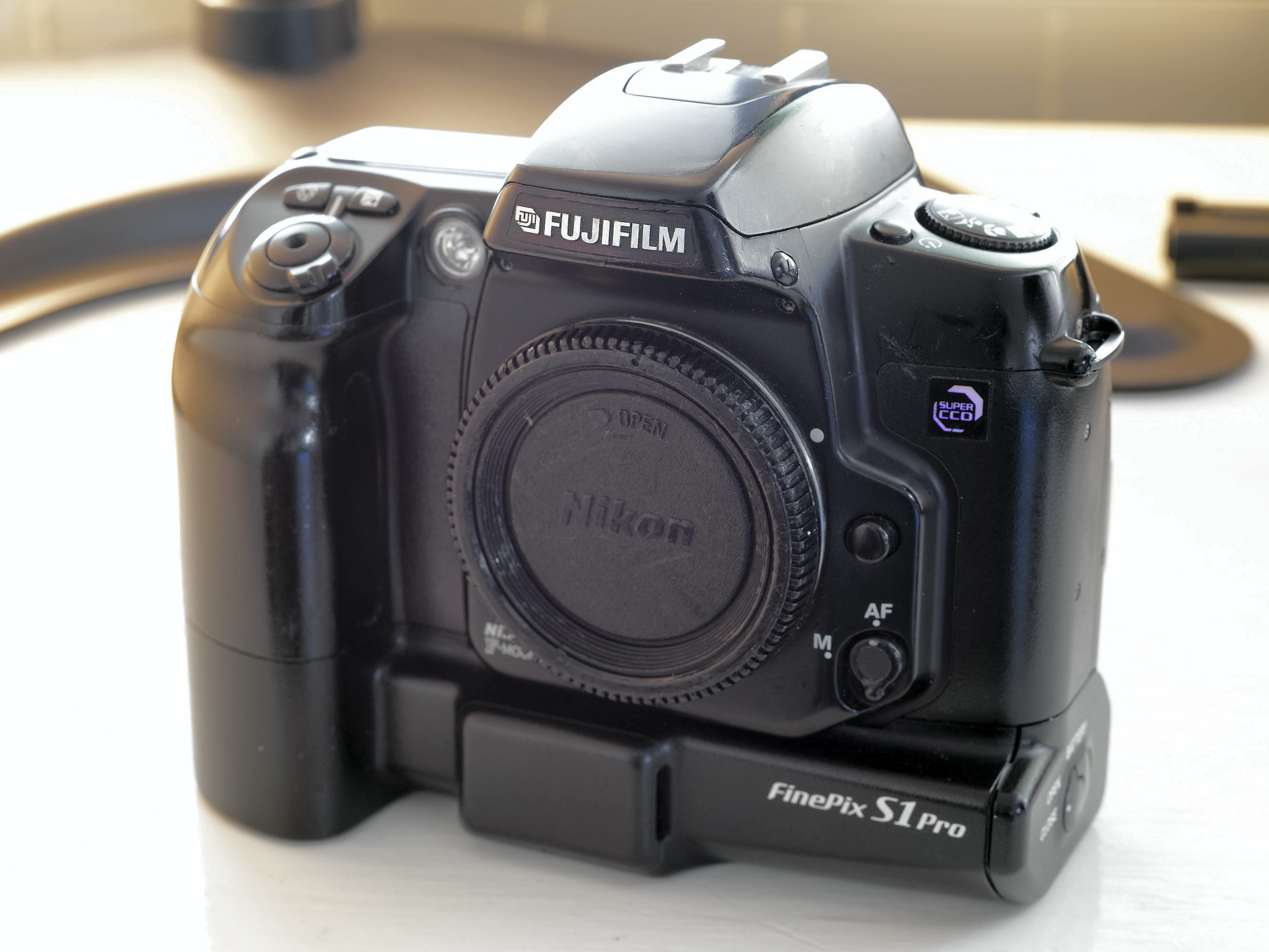
A Fujifilm FinePix S1 Pro digital SLR.

The Fujifilm FinePix S1 Pro was an interchangeable lens digital single-lens reflex camera introduced in January 2000. It was based on a Nikon F60 (Nikon N60 in the U.S.) film camera body that was modified by Fujifilm to include its own proprietary image sensor and electronics. Because of the Nikon body, it had a Nikon F lens mount and so could use most lenses made for Nikon 35 mm cameras. It was autofocusing, had an electronically controlled focal plane shutter with speeds from 30 sec. to 1/2000 sec. and built-in exposure metering and pop-up flash. Its ISO film speed equivalents ranged from 320 to 1600. The camera is no longer in production, having been superseded by the Fujifilm FinePix S2 Pro in January 2002.

Aside from the Nikon lens mount, the camera's principal distinction was its unique (and controversial) 3.1 megapixel photo sensor. Known as the Super CCD, it was unique in having its photodiodes oriented diagonally rather than horizontally and vertically as in all other SLR cameras. This allowed the use of a sophisticated interpolation system that, according to Fujifilm, produced an output image equivalent to 6.2 megapixels. The apparent resolution of images in this interpolated mode lay somewhere between 3.1 megapixels and the 6.2 megapixel interpolated output.

Family	Level	Sensor	1998	1999	2000	2001	2002	2003	2004	2005	2006	2007	2008	2009	2010
Fujix	Professional	2/3 inch		DS-565											
Fujix	Professional	2/3 inch		DS-560											
FinePix	Industrial	APS-C										S3 Pro UVIR	IS Pro		
FinePix	Advanced	APS-C			S1 Pro		S2 Pro		S3 Pro			S5 Pro			
