= Nikon F50 =

Camera model

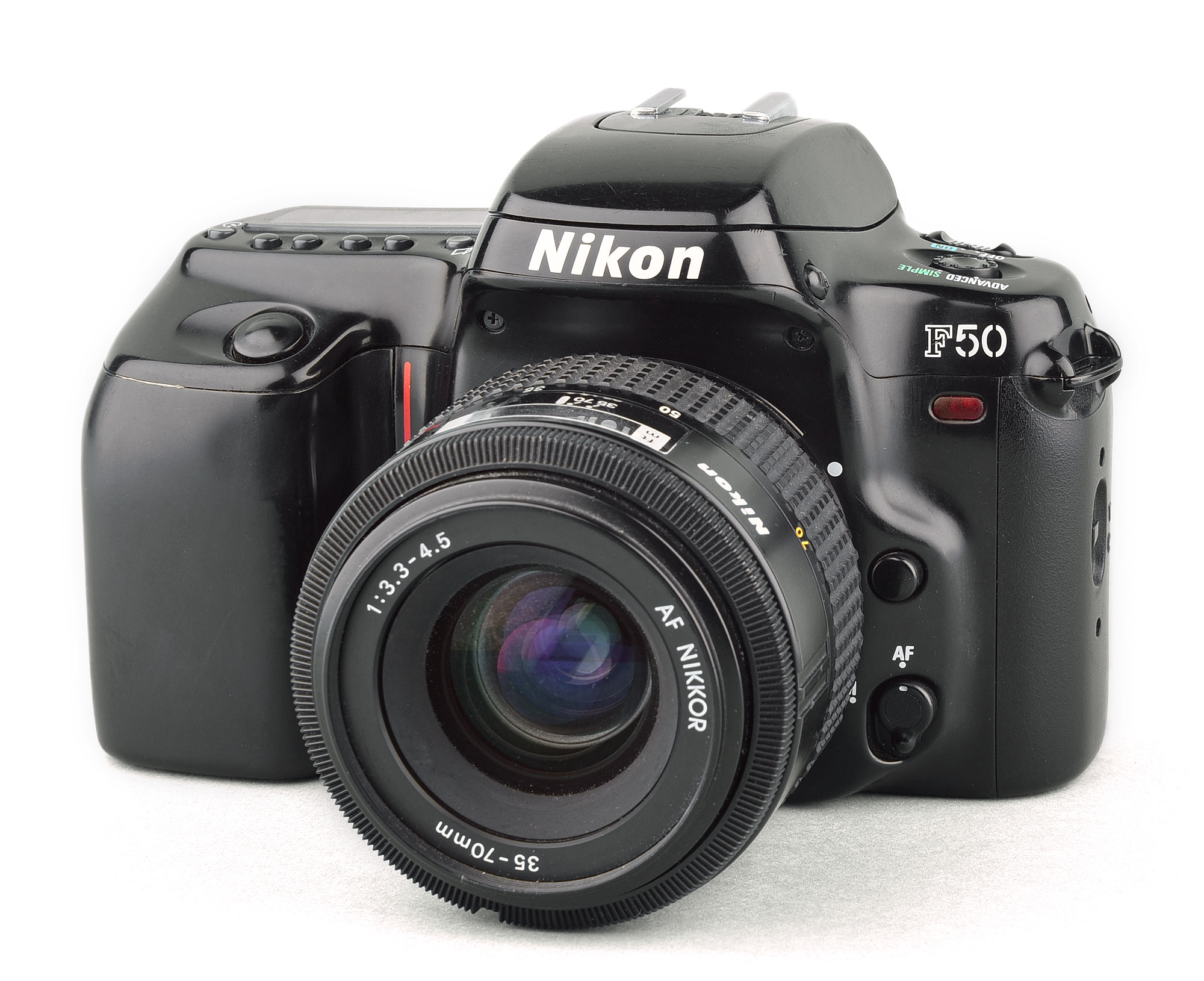
Nikon F50 with 35-70mm AF lens

The F50 (or N50 as it is known in North America) is a 35mm film SLR camera which was introduced by Nikon in 1994. It was aimed at the lower end of the amateur autofocus SLR market.

The F50 features autofocus, TTL light metering and various "programs" (ranging from manual operation to a highly automated point and shoot mode). It could not, however, meter with non-CPU lenses.

It was replaced by the similarly-priced F60 (also known as the N60) in 1998.

== History ==
A variant known as the F50D or N50D, which added a date/time-imprinting facility and also panoramic mode.

== Design ==
The F50 body was made from polycarbonate and metal, and available in both "champagne silver" and black.

Notable omissions include depth-of-field preview and any form of remote shutter release.

== Specifications ==
Mount	F-mount
Shutter	1/2000 to 30 sec.
Power Battery	2CR5 6V
Dimensions	149 x 96 x 70 mm
Weight	580 grams

== Photos ==
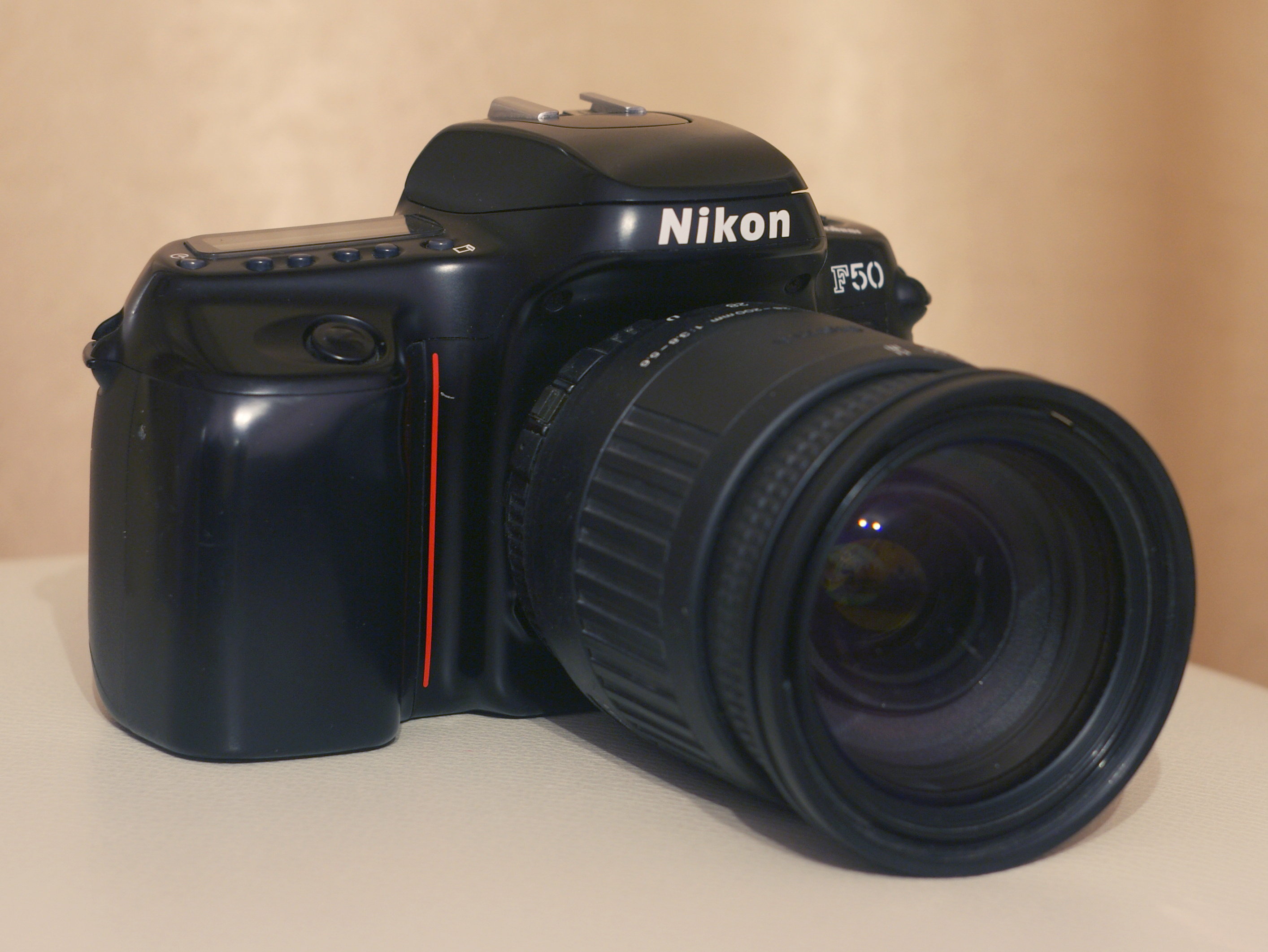

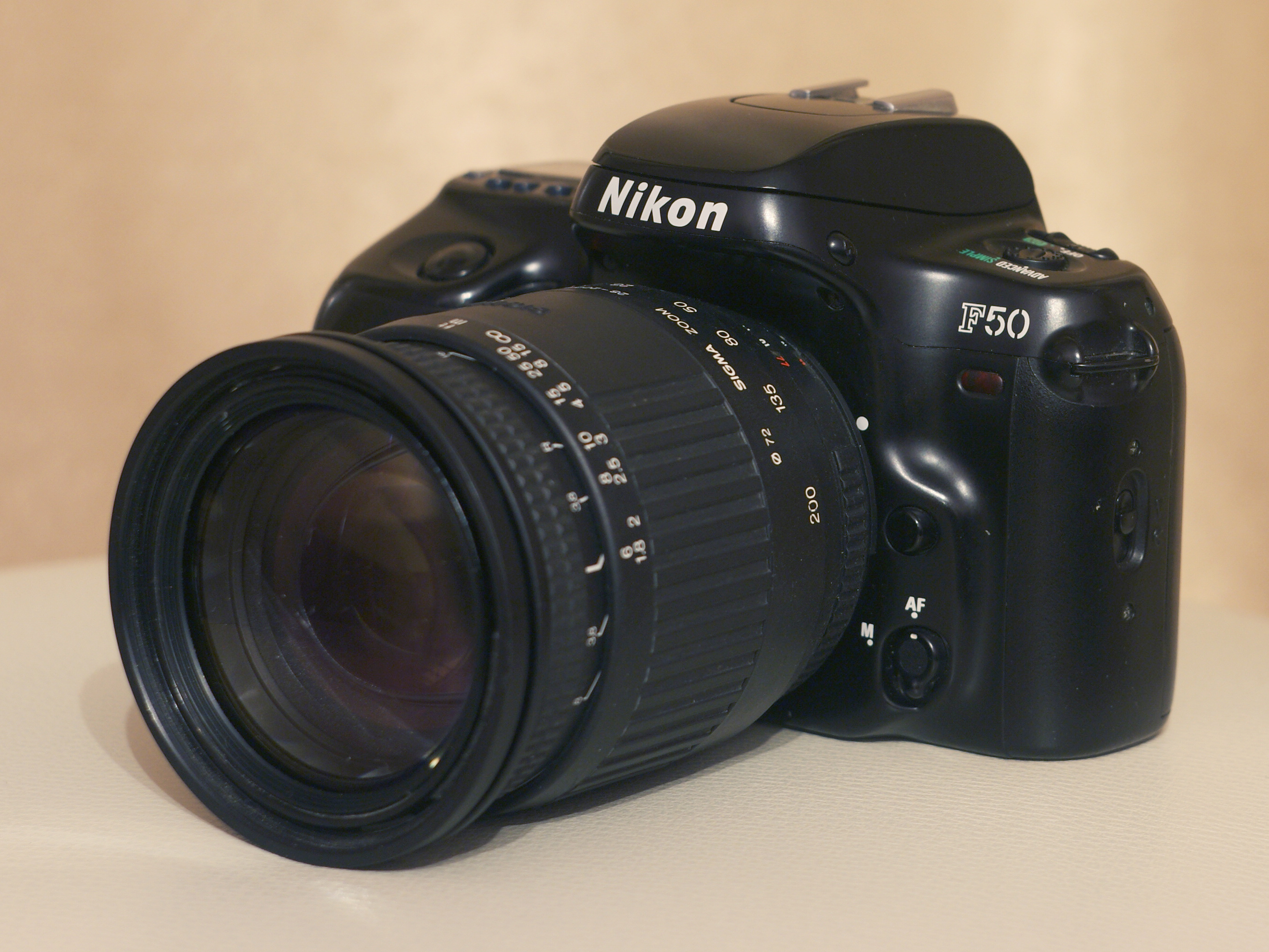

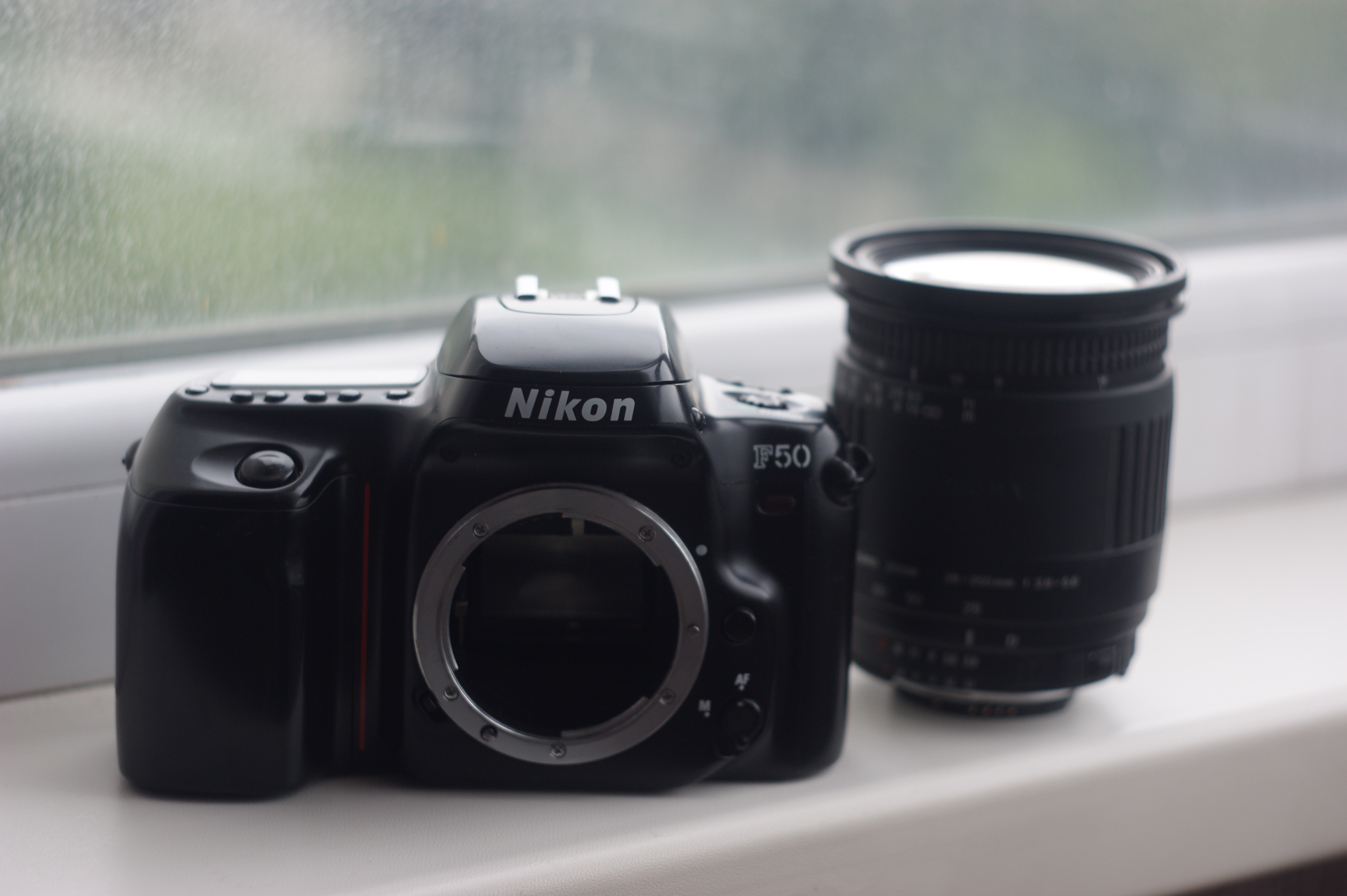

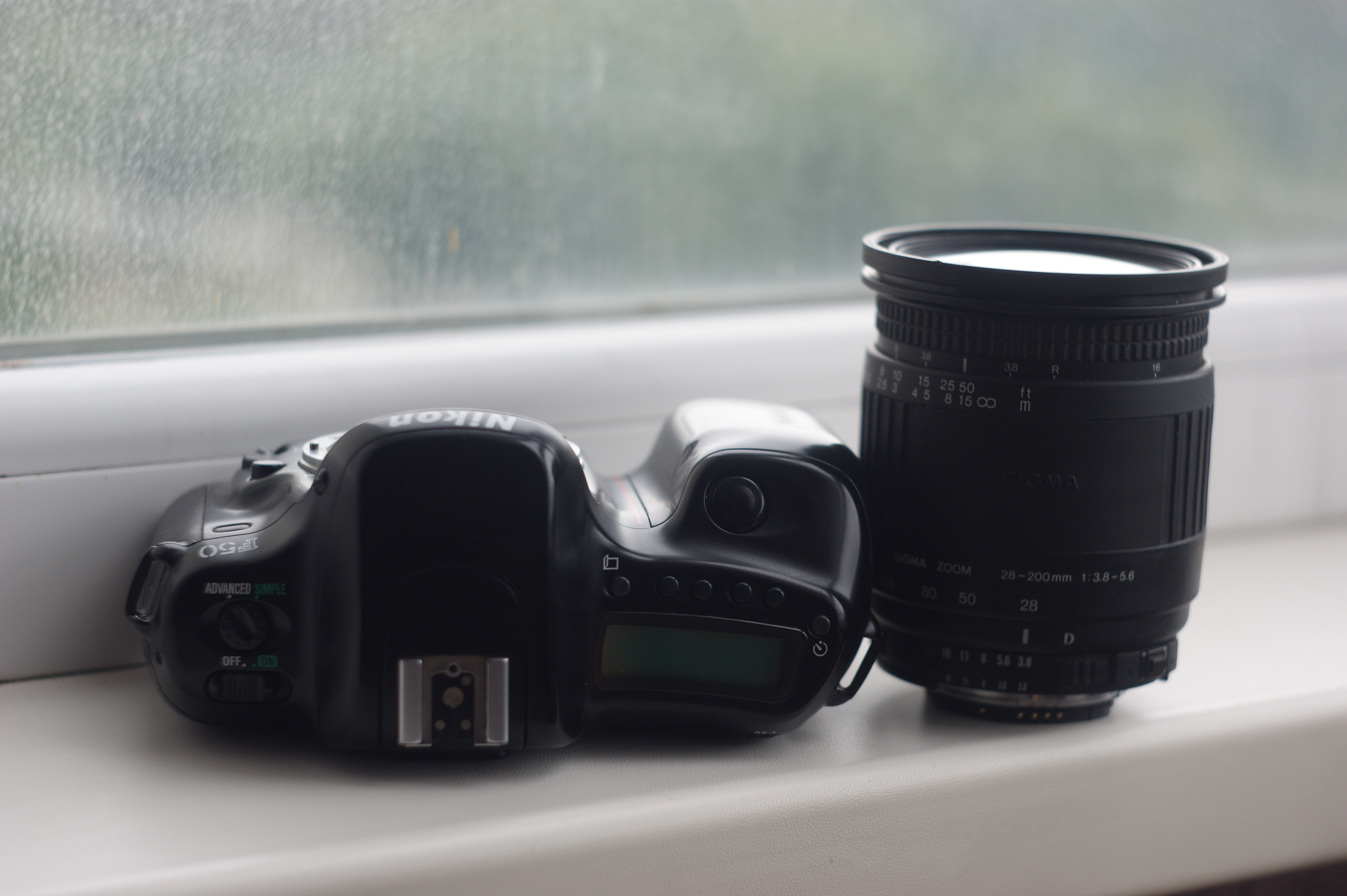

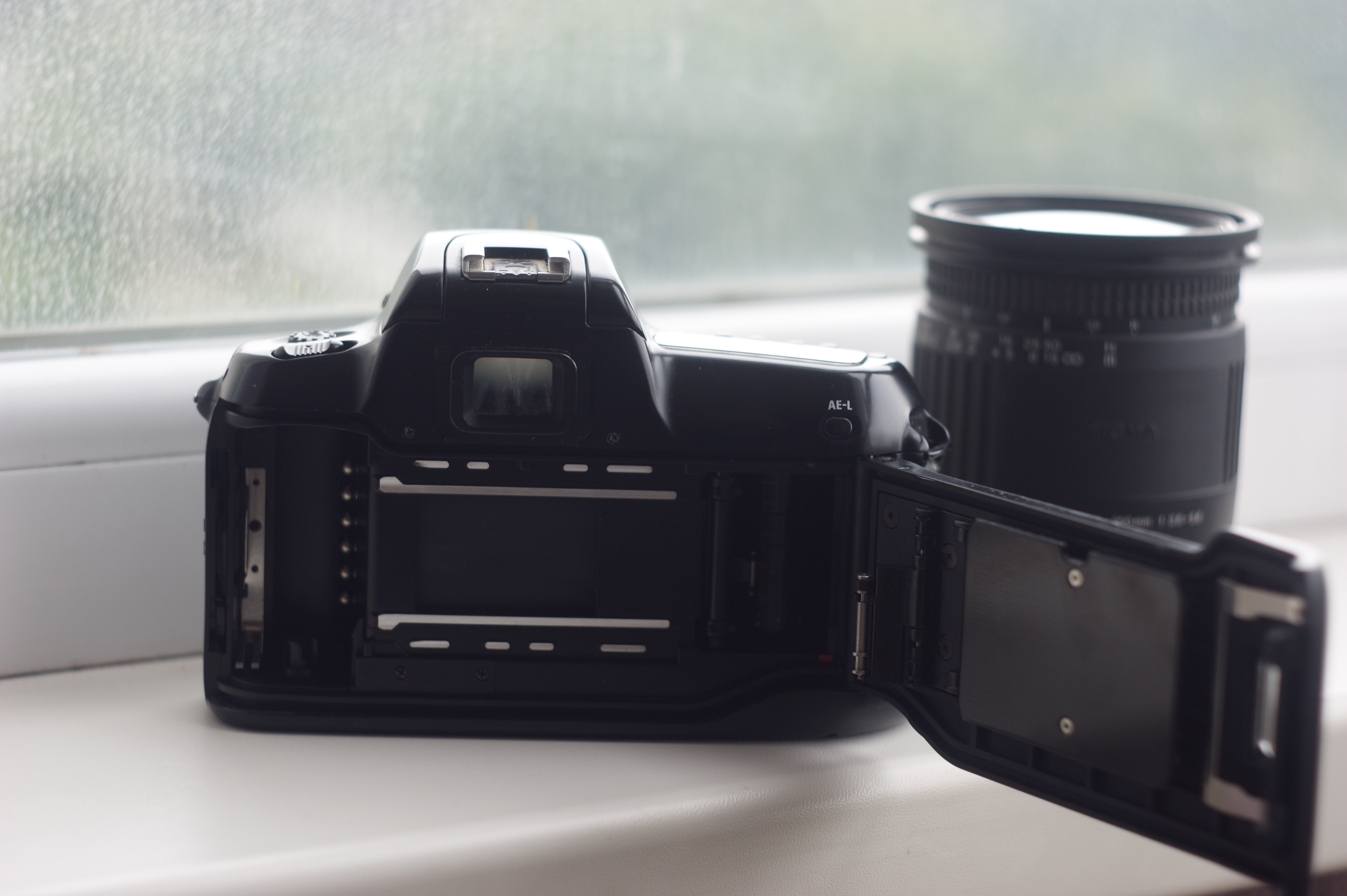

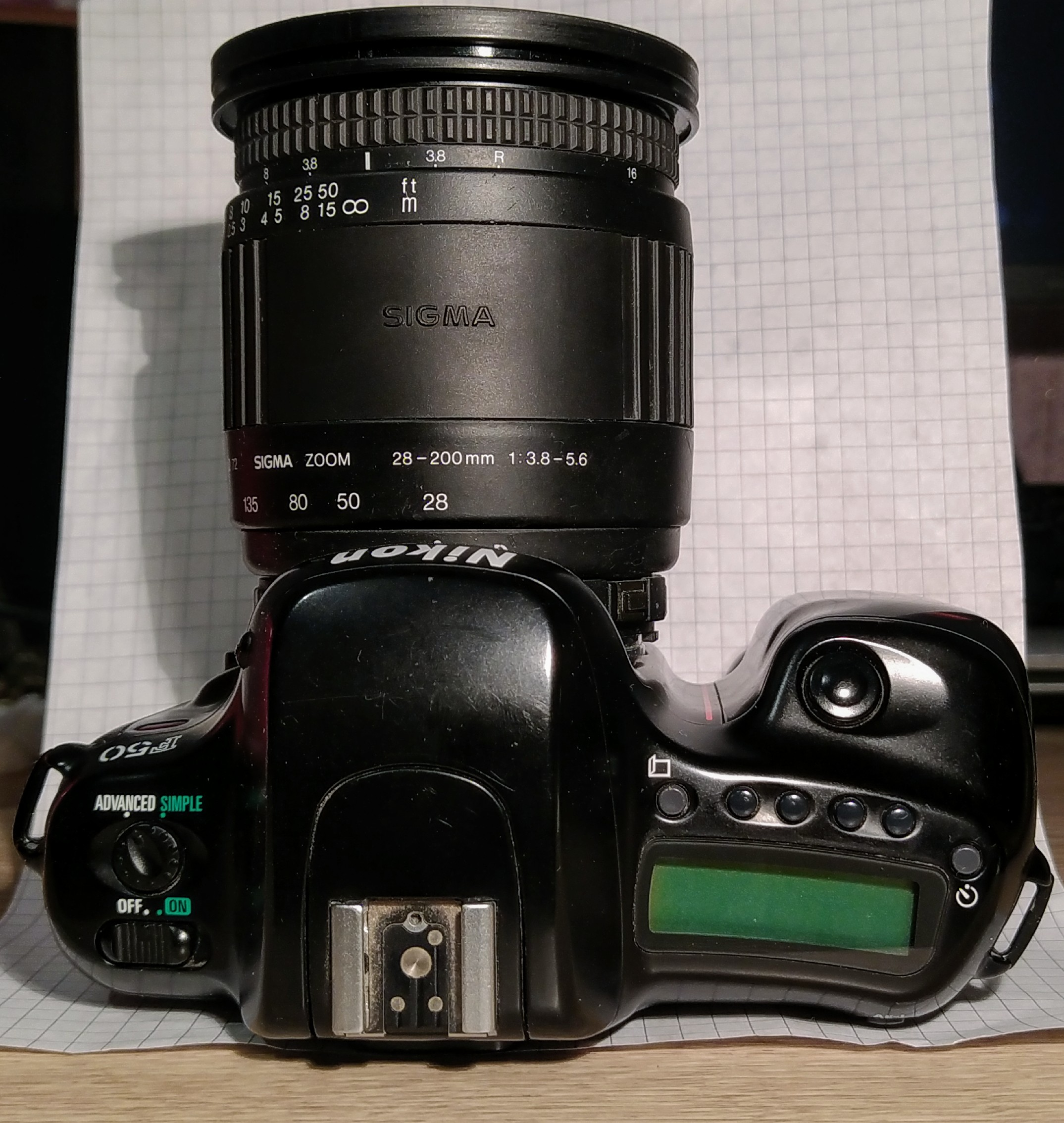

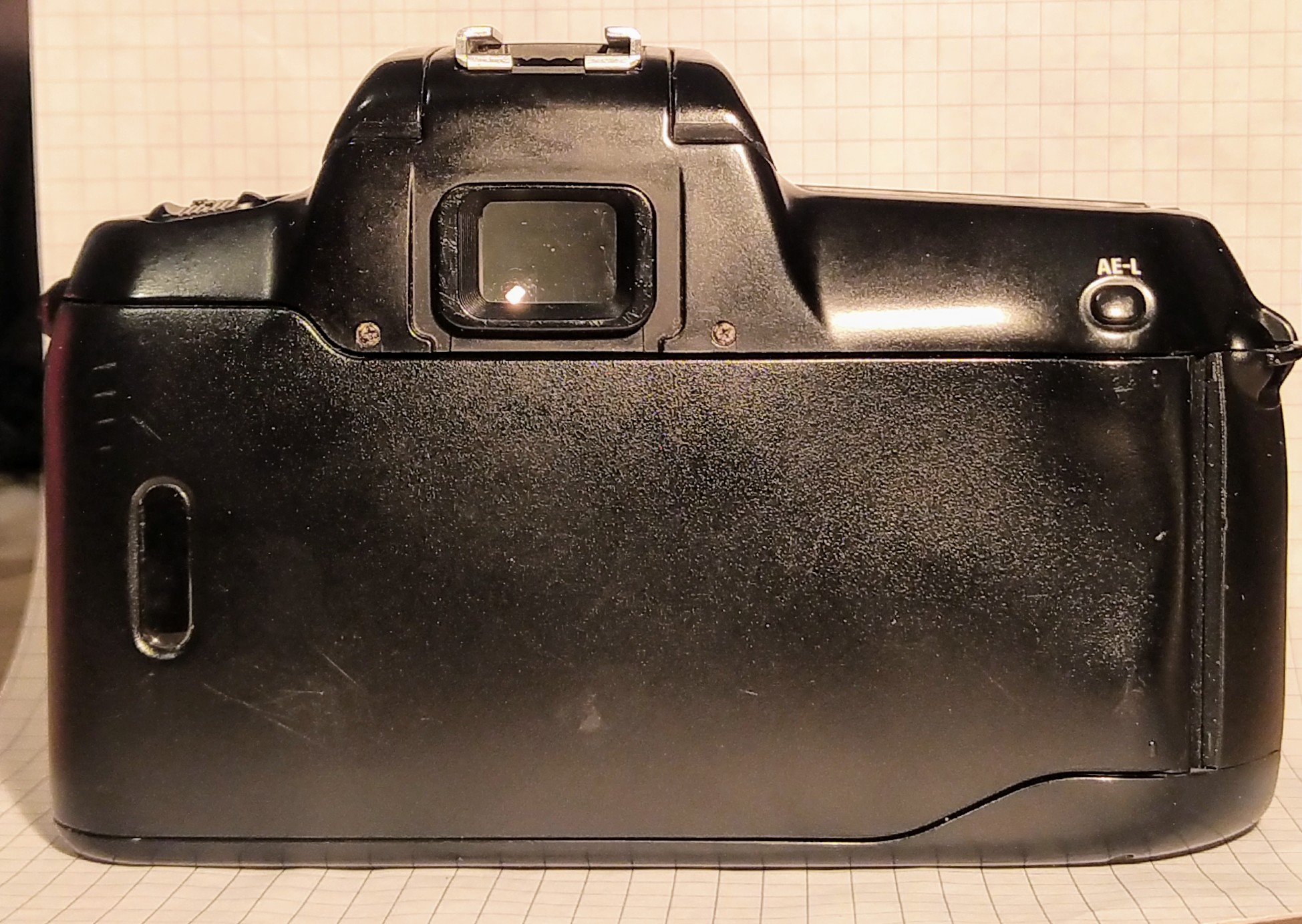

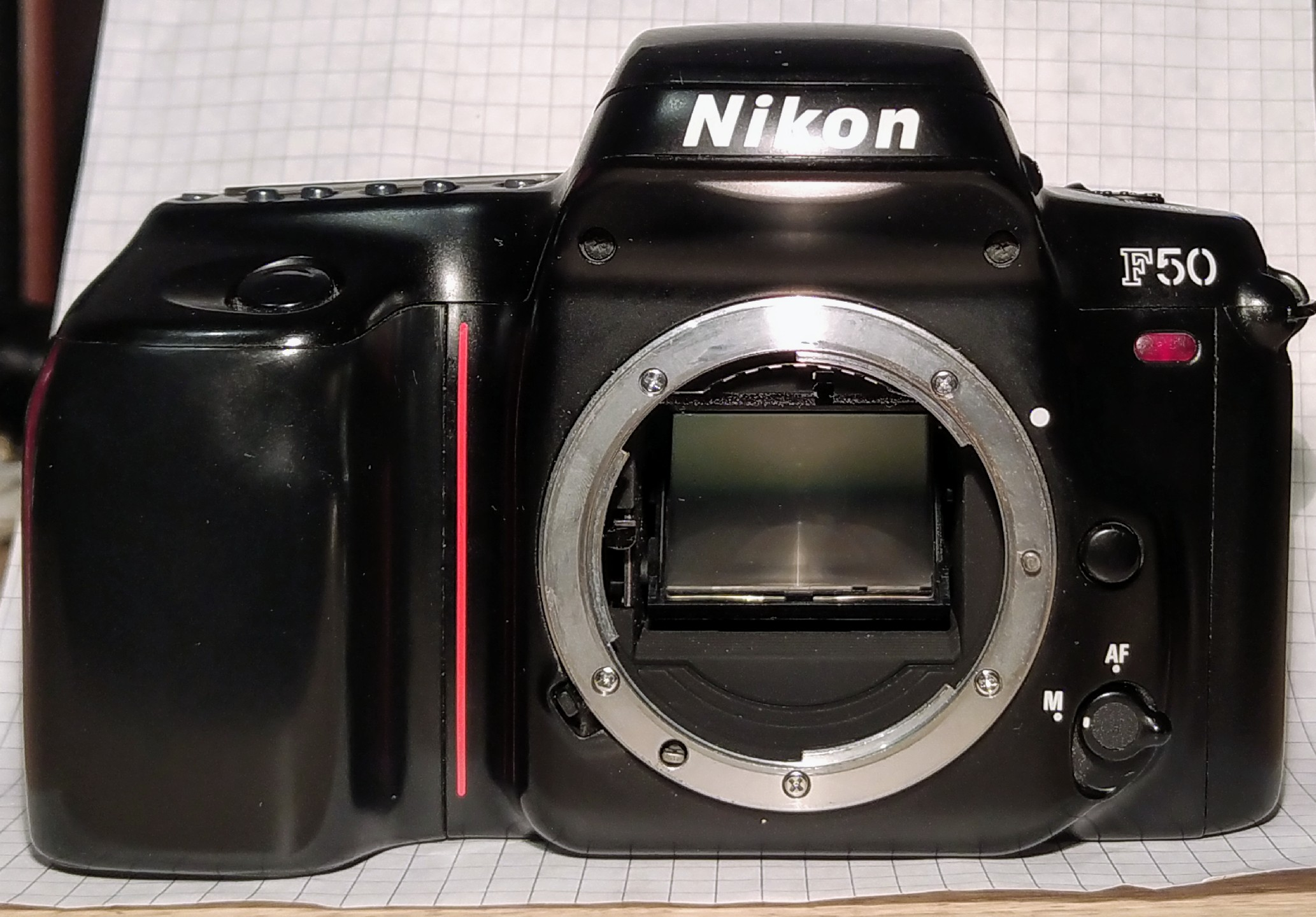

Class	1950s			1960s										1970s										1980s										1990s										2000s										2020s			
Class	57	58	59	60	61	62	63	64	65	66	67	68	69	70	71	72	73	74	75	76	77	78	79	80	81	82	83	84	85	86	87	88	89	90	91	92	93	94	95	96	97	98	99	00	01	02	03	04	05	06	07	08	09	...	20	21	22
Profes- sional			F																					F3																																	
Profes- sional															F2												F3AF					F4								F5								F6									
High- end																											FA					F-801 (N8008)/ F-801s (N8008s)				F90 (N90)		F90X (N90s)					F100														
Mid- range																														F-501 (N2020)				F-601 (N6006)				F70 (N70)						F80 (N80)													
Mid- range																EL / EL2 /ELW						FE					FE2							F-601M (N6000)				F70 (N70)						F80 (N80)													
Mid- range									FT		FTn/ FT2/ FT3										FM					FM2/FM2n																			FM3A												
Mid- range									FS												FM					FM2/FM2n																			FM3A												
Entry- level																																																									
Entry- level																																								Pronea 600i/6i																	
Entry- level																																										Pronea S															
Entry- level						Nikkorex F / Nikkor J																	EM			FG			F-301 (N2000)				F-401s (N4004s)					F50 (N50)							F65 (N65 / U)		F75 (N75 / U2)										
Entry- level				35		35 II		Auto 35																				FG-20			F-401 (N4004)				F-401x (N5005)								F60 (N60)			F55 (N55)											
Entry- level							Zoom 35																																FM10 / FE10																		
Class	57	58	59	60	61	62	63	64	65	66	67	68	69	70	71	72	73	74	75	76	77	78	79	80	81	82	83	84	85	86	87	88	89	90	91	92	93	94	95	96	97	98	99	00	01	02	03	04	05	06	07	08	09	...	20	21	22
Class	1950s			1960s										1970s										1980s										1990s										2000s										2020s			
