= Nikon F75 =

35mm SLR camera

Nikon F75 (N75)
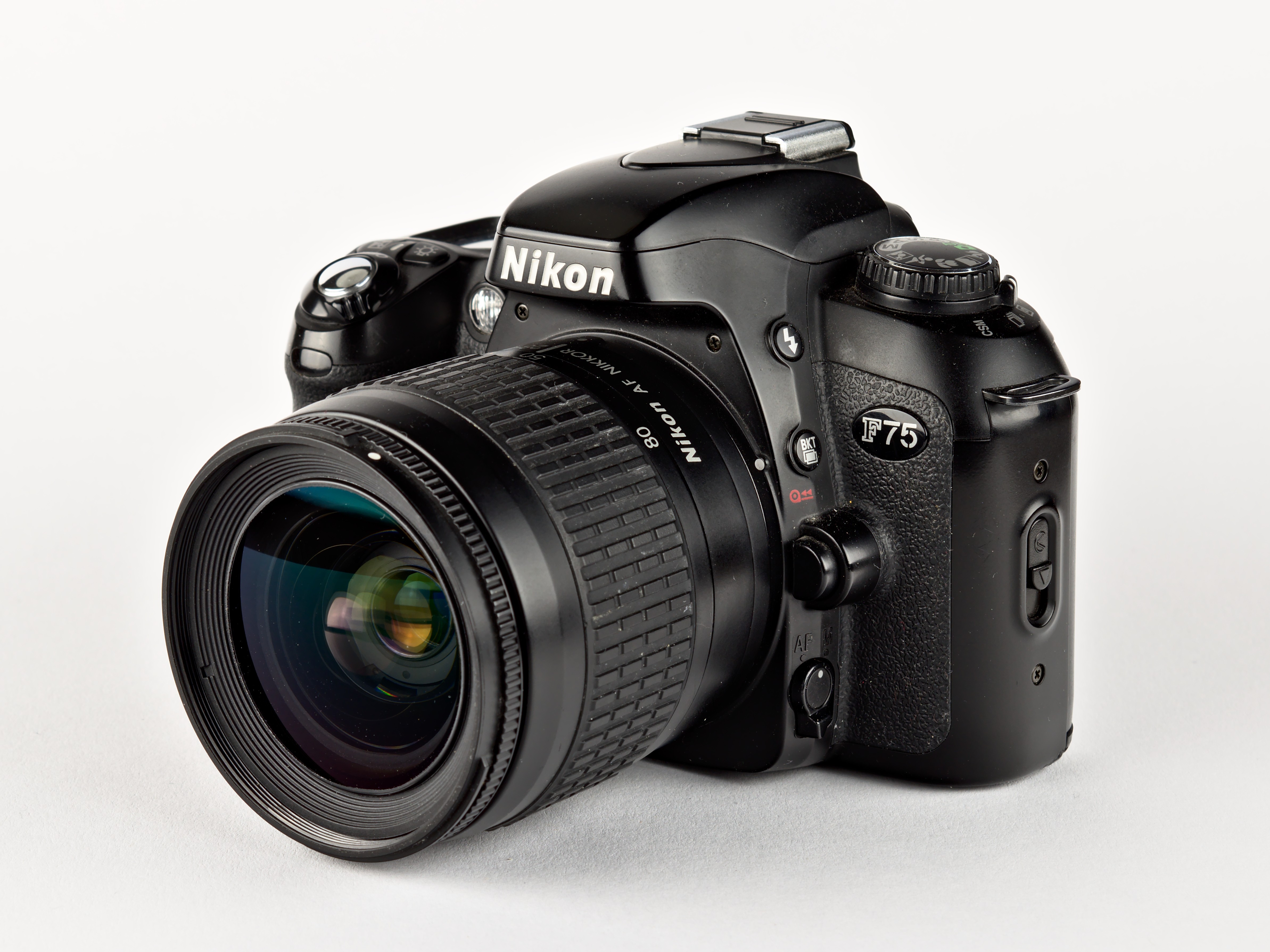

Overview
- Maker: Nikon
- Type: 35mm SLR
- Production: 2003-02 through 2006-01 (3 years 11 months)

Lens
- Lens mount: Nikon F-mount

Focusing
- Focus: TTL Phase Detection Autofocus (5 zones)

Exposure/metering
- Exposure: Nikon 3D Matrix (25 zones), Spot, and Center-weighted

Shutter
- Frame rate: 1.5 frame/s

General
- Battery: 2x CR2
- Weight: 380 g (13 oz)
- Made in: Thailand

The Nikon F75 (sold in the United States as the N75 and Japan as the U2) was the last consumer-level autofocus 35mm SLR camera sold by the Nikon Corporation beginning in 2003. The camera replaced the similarly consumer-targeted Nikon F65.

== History and design ==
The Nikon F75 was released in February 2003 and was positioned as an entry-level autofocus film SLR aimed at budget-conscious consumers. While it shares design language and some core features with the Nikon N80 (F80), the F75 is a more streamlined version with a lighter, largely plastic build. The camera was offered in silver or black and retailed for approximately $300 with a lens, with rebates commonly available. Body-only versions sold for around $190.

The F75's features include depth-of-field preview, illuminated LCDs, pop-up flash, and multiple user-friendly exposure modes. The N75 also has new features, such as a 25 segment meter and a battery level indicator in the viewfinder. A version designated the F75 QD (or N75 QD in the U.S.) featured a built-in quartz date back for imprinting the date onto photographs. The N75 is compatible with most Nikon F-mount lenses, including AF, AF-D, AF-S, VR, AI, and AI-S types. It does not support pre-AI lenses, which cannot be mounted without risking damage. Autofocus functions with screw-drive lenses, so a built-in motor is not required for AF operation. The F75 uses two CR2 lithium batteries.

Despite the advanced design and low cost, the Nikon F75 was released around the time digital cameras became mainstream, and its release was overshadowed by Nikon's more successful DSLRs, the Nikon D100 and D70. It was discontinued in January 2006, but it is still sold cheaply on the used market, and is valued because it can drive Nikon's newest F-mount lens designs.

== Gallery ==
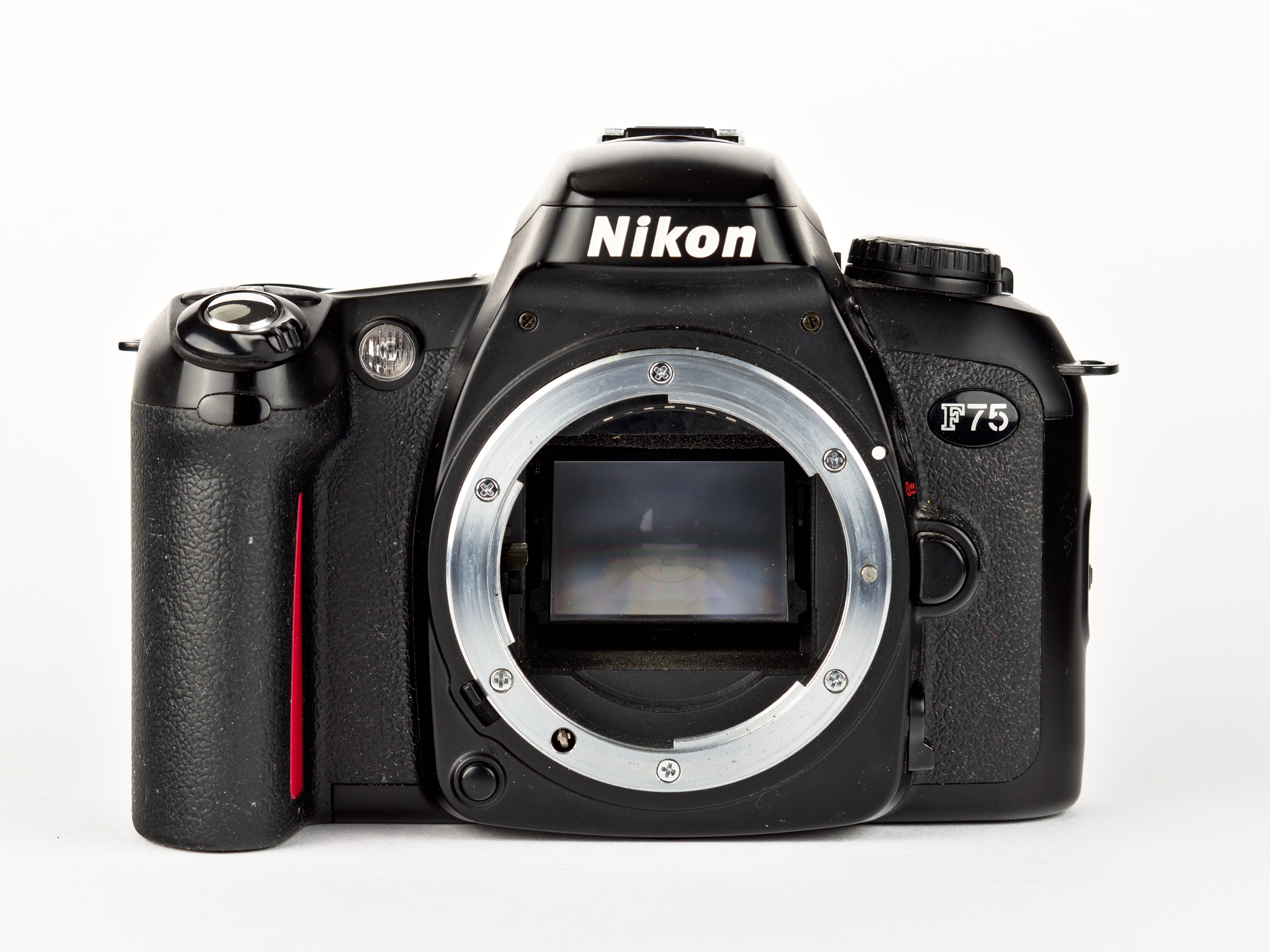
Nikon N75 body

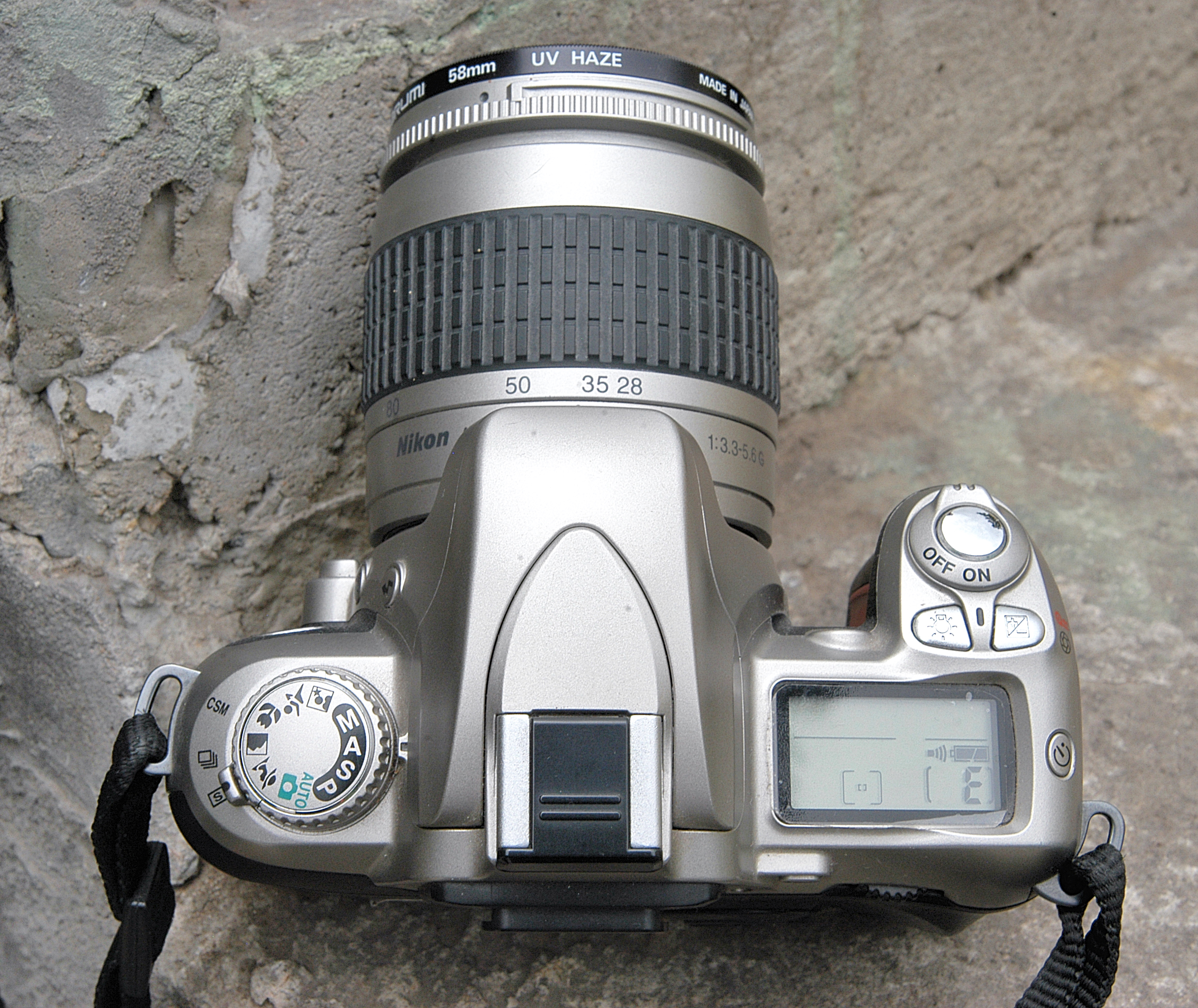
Nikon N75 silver body, from the top

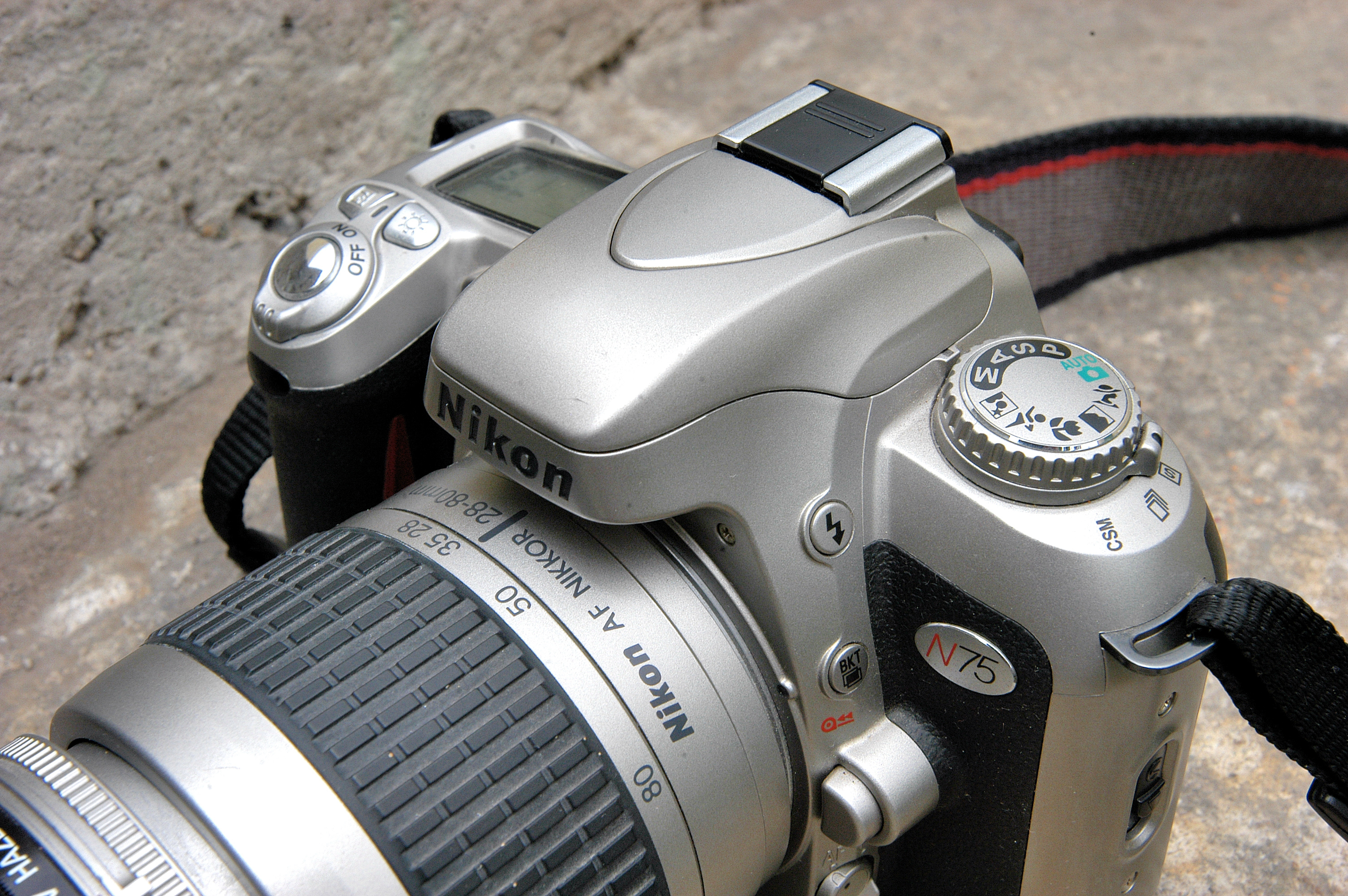
Nikon N75 silver body, detail

Class	1950s					1960s										1970s										1980s										1990s										2000s										2020s			
Class	55	56	57	58	59	60	61	62	63	64	65	66	67	68	69	70	71	72	73	74	75	76	77	78	79	80	81	82	83	84	85	86	87	88	89	90	91	92	93	94	95	96	97	98	99	00	01	02	03	04	05	06	07	08	09	...	20	21	22
Professional					F																					F3																																	
Professional																	F2												F3AF					F4								F5								F6									
High-end																													FA					F-801 (N8008)/ F-801s (N8008s)				F90 (N90)		F90X (N90s)					F100														
Mid-range																																F-501 (N2020)				F-601 (N6006)				F70 (N70)						F80 (N80)													
Mid-range																		EL / EL2 /ELW						FE					FE2							F-601M (N6000)				F70 (N70)						F80 (N80)													
Mid-range											FT		FTn/ FT2/ FT3										FM					FM2/FM2n																			FM3A												
Mid-range											FS												FM					FM2/FM2n																			FM3A												
Entry-level																																																											
Entry-level																																										Pronea S																	
Entry-level																																									Pronea 600i/6i																		
Entry-level								Nikkorex F / Nikkor J																	EM			FG			F-301 (N2000)				F-401s (N4004s)					F50 (N50)							F65 (N65 / U)		F75 (N75 / U2)										
Entry-level						35		35 II		Auto 35																				FG-20			F-401 (N4004)				F-401x (N5005)								F60 (N60)			F55 (N55)											
Entry-level									Zoom 35																																FM10 / FE10																		
Class	55	56	57	58	59	60	61	62	63	64	65	66	67	68	69	70	71	72	73	74	75	76	77	78	79	80	81	82	83	84	85	86	87	88	89	90	91	92	93	94	95	96	97	98	99	00	01	02	03	04	05	06	07	08	09	...	20	21	22
Class	1950s					1960s										1970s										1980s										1990s										2000s										2020s			
