= Nikon F60 =

Nikon F60 / Nikon N60
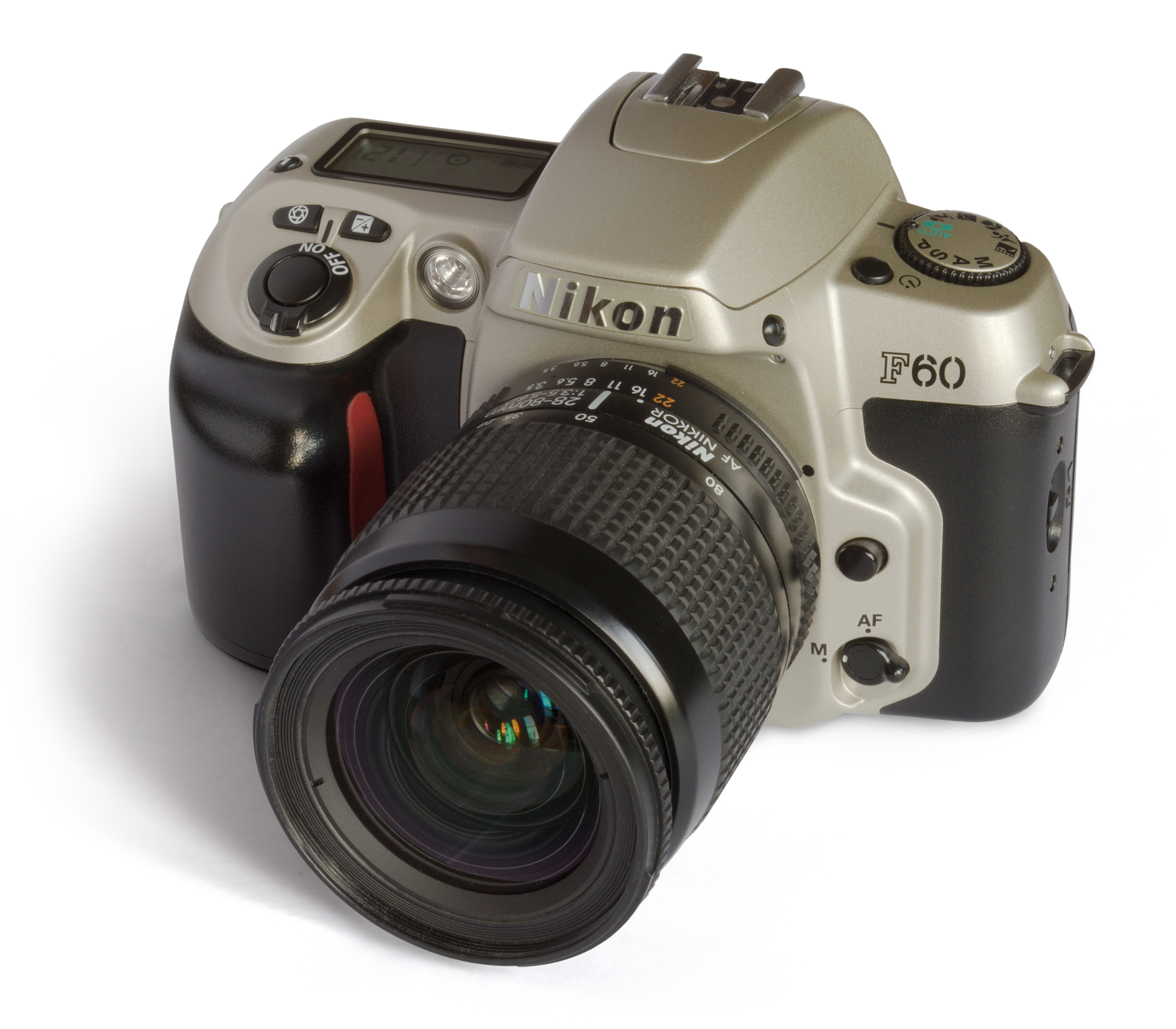
- Nikon F60 with AF Nikkor 28-80mm zoom lens

Overview
- Maker: Nikon
- Type: 35 mm SLR
- Released: 1998

Lens
- Lens mount: Nikon F-mount

General
- Battery: 2x CR123A
- Dimensions: 148.5×96×69 mm (5.85×3.78×2.72 in)
- Weight: approx. 575 g (1.268 lb) (F60), 585 g (1.290 lb) (F60D)

The F60 (or N60 as it is known in the U.S.) is a 35mm film SLR camera which was sold by Nikon between 1998 and 2001. It replaced the F50 and was aimed at the lower end of the amateur autofocus SLR market.

The F60 features autofocus, two forms of TTL light metering and various "programs" (ranging from manual operation to a highly automated point and shoot mode).

It was replaced by the similarly-priced F65 (also known as the N65 in the U.S. and the Nikon U in Japan) in 2001.

== History ==
The F60 was introduced in late 1998 as the successor to the F50. It was targeted at the consumer market and at the time of release was Nikon's lowest-priced SLR on sale in the UK. It was noted by some reviewers that the F60's wheel-based interface was easier to use than the pushbutton interface of the F50.

A variant known as the F60D or N60D, which added a date/time-imprinting facility was also available.

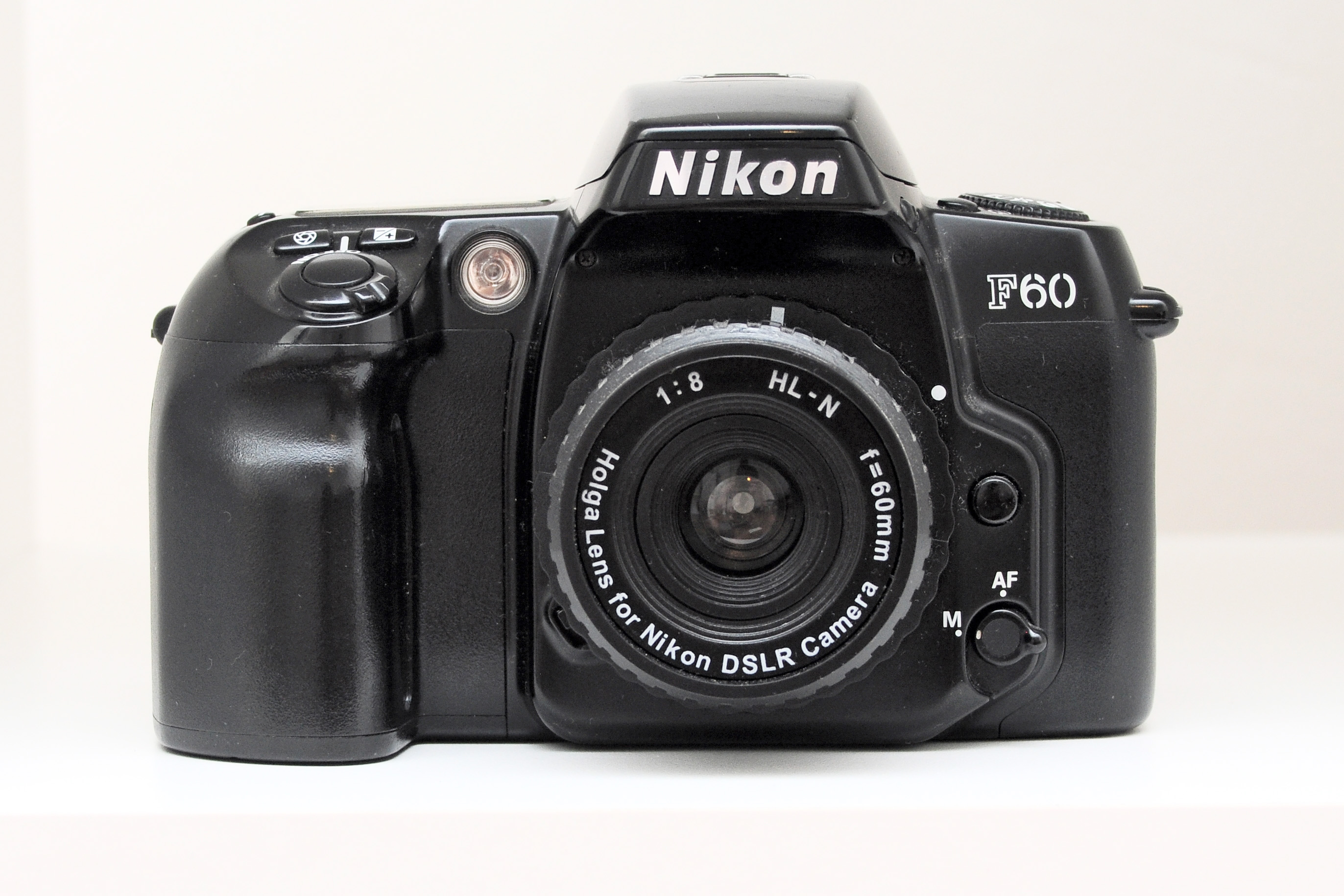
Nikon F60 in black, with Holga lens

== Design ==
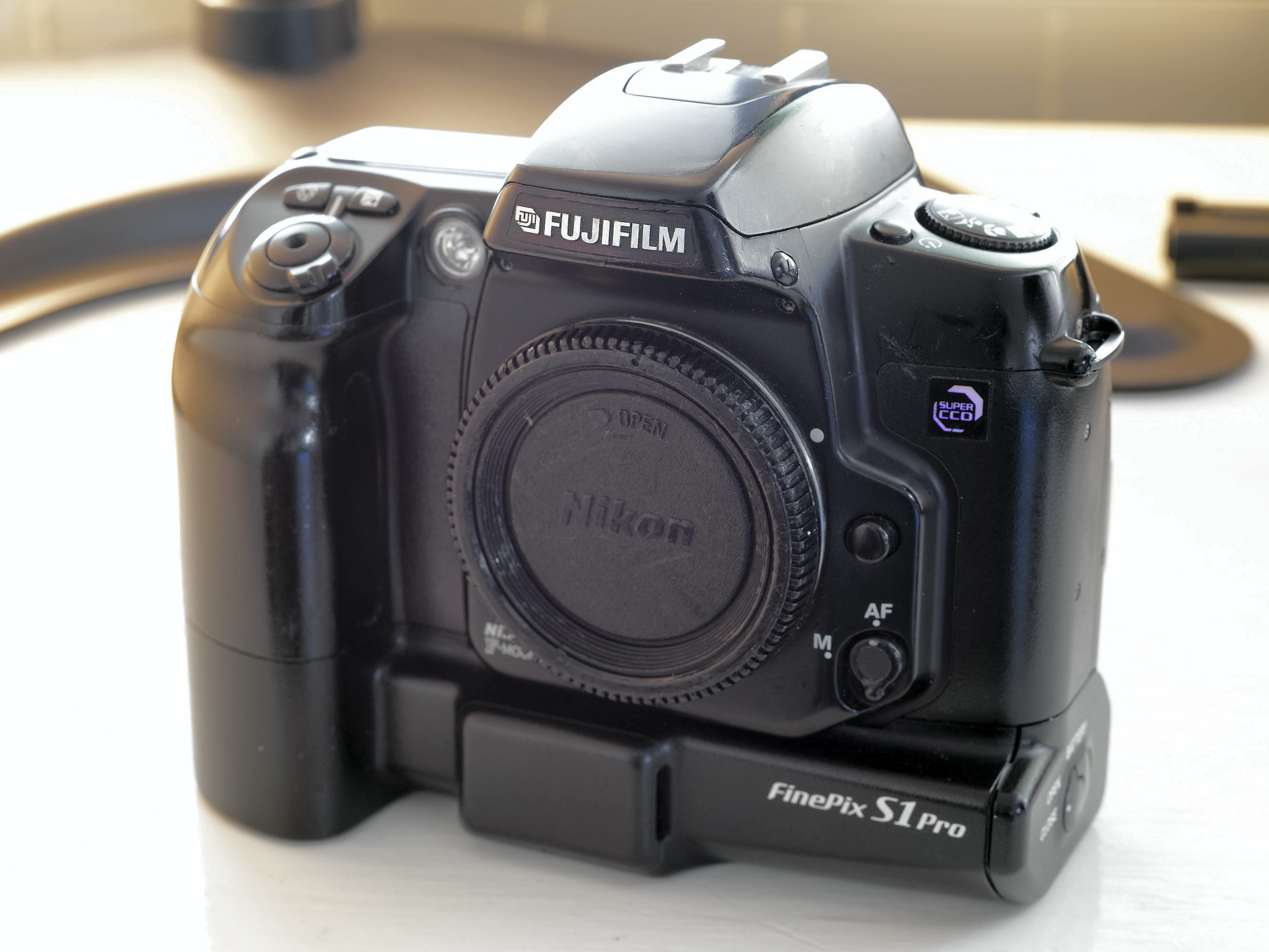
Fujifilm FinePix S1 Pro digital SLR.

The F60 body was made from polycarbonate and metal, and available in both "champagne silver" and black. It features compatibility with most older Nikkor F-mount lenses, except AFS and pre-AI lenses. However, in some cases autofocus and/or TTL metering is not supported.

Features of the F60 include the 'T' Time setting - where a first press of the shutter release opens the shutter, and a second closes it, and AF servo tracking in 'Sport' mode. The camera also supports five different flash modes, including 'slow' for low light scenes. The film speed is only automatically adjustable by DX encoding.

Notable omissions include depth-of-field preview and any form of remote shutter release. Both these features were included in the F65.

The body was used as the basis of Fuji's popular Fuji S1 Pro digital SLR of 2001, with modifications to add a colour LCD, a digital storage compartment, and a separate battery compartment for the digital portion. The S1 removed the 'T' setting but added a physical remote shutter release screw.

Class	1950s					1960s										1970s										1980s										1990s										2000s										2020s			
Class	55	56	57	58	59	60	61	62	63	64	65	66	67	68	69	70	71	72	73	74	75	76	77	78	79	80	81	82	83	84	85	86	87	88	89	90	91	92	93	94	95	96	97	98	99	00	01	02	03	04	05	06	07	08	09	...	20	21	22
Professional					F																					F3																																	
Professional																	F2												F3AF					F4								F5								F6									
High-end																													FA					F-801 (N8008)/ F-801s (N8008s)				F90 (N90)		F90X (N90s)					F100														
Mid-range																																F-501 (N2020)				F-601 (N6006)				F70 (N70)						F80 (N80)													
Mid-range																		EL / EL2 /ELW						FE					FE2							F-601M (N6000)				F70 (N70)						F80 (N80)													
Mid-range											FT		FTn/ FT2/ FT3										FM					FM2/FM2n																			FM3A												
Mid-range											FS												FM					FM2/FM2n																			FM3A												
Entry-level																																																											
Entry-level																																										Pronea S																	
Entry-level																																									Pronea 600i/6i																		
Entry-level								Nikkorex F / Nikkor J																	EM			FG			F-301 (N2000)				F-401s (N4004s)					F50 (N50)							F65 (N65 / U)		F75 (N75 / U2)										
Entry-level						35		35 II		Auto 35																				FG-20			F-401 (N4004)				F-401x (N5005)								F60 (N60)			F55 (N55)											
Entry-level									Zoom 35																																FM10 / FE10																		
Class	55	56	57	58	59	60	61	62	63	64	65	66	67	68	69	70	71	72	73	74	75	76	77	78	79	80	81	82	83	84	85	86	87	88	89	90	91	92	93	94	95	96	97	98	99	00	01	02	03	04	05	06	07	08	09	...	20	21	22
Class	1950s					1960s										1970s										1980s										1990s										2000s										2020s			
