= Nikon F55 =

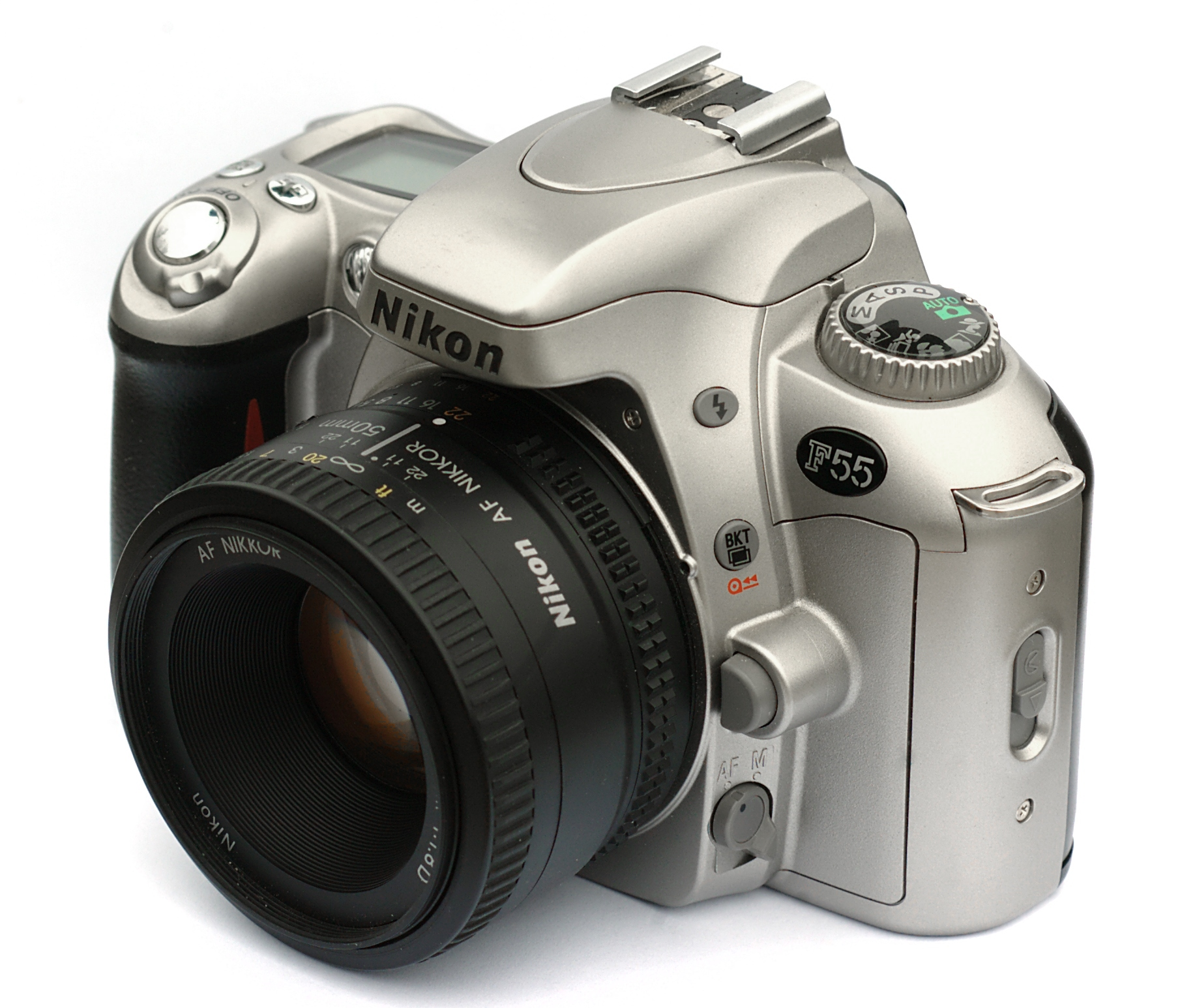
- Nikon F55 with a 50mm f/1.8D

Overview
- Type: SLR
- Released: 2002

Lens
- Lens: interchangeable lens, Nikon F-mount
- Compatible lenses: Nikon F-mount lenses with some exceptions

Sensor/medium
- Film format: 35mm
- Film size: 36mm x 24mm
- Film advance: Auto
- Film rewind: Auto, partial roll rewind possible

Focusing
- Focus modes: Autofocus

Exposure/metering
- Exposure modes: Shutter Priority, Aperture Priority, Metered Manual, 7 subject specific Program modes
- Exposure metering: 5 segment matrix with G or D-type lenses; Matrix with other AF and AI-P; Heavily center-weighted partial-aria metering selected in Manual

Flash
- Flash: Pop-up TTL, Hot Shoe (non-TTL only)
- Flash synchronization: 1/90s maximum
- Compatible flashes: Dedicated Nikon hot shoe mounted flashes; other non-dedicated hot shoe flashes; non-hot shoe flashes with adapter

Shutter
- Shutter: electromagnetically controlled
- Shutter speed range: 30s – 1/2000s
- Continuous shooting: 1.5 frame/s in Sports Program mode

Viewfinder
- Viewfinder: Fixed eye-level penta-mirror

General
- Battery: Two (2) 3V CR2 lithium batteries
- Dimensions: 129 x 92 x 65mm (F55/N55) 129 x 92 x 67.5mm (F55D/N55D)
- Weight: 350 g (12 oz) (F55/N55) 360g (F55D/N55D)

The F55 (also known as the N55 in the US or the Nikon Us in Japan) is a 35mm film SLR autofocus camera introduced by Nikon in 2002.

== History and description ==
It was targeted at a new and lower price-point than the F65 (previously Nikon's cheapest autofocus SLR). The F65 continued to be sold alongside the F55. The camera is made in Thailand.

It is unique among Nikon autofocus SLRs of its era in that it does not support autofocus on Nikon lenses with "AF-S" silent wave motor focussing, or the "VR" optical stabilisation features found on some lenses.

It features several different operating modes, including seven program modes that are subject specific, Aperture Priority, Shutter Priority, and Manual.

Included with the F55D variant is a date/time-imprinting facility, ("Data imprinting,") but at the cost of a slightly larger camera body.

Class	1950s					1960s										1970s										1980s										1990s										2000s										2020s			
Class	55	56	57	58	59	60	61	62	63	64	65	66	67	68	69	70	71	72	73	74	75	76	77	78	79	80	81	82	83	84	85	86	87	88	89	90	91	92	93	94	95	96	97	98	99	00	01	02	03	04	05	06	07	08	09	...	20	21	22
Professional					F																					F3																																	
Professional																	F2												F3AF					F4								F5								F6									
High-end																													FA					F-801 (N8008)/ F-801s (N8008s)				F90 (N90)		F90X (N90s)					F100														
Mid-range																																F-501 (N2020)				F-601 (N6006)				F70 (N70)						F80 (N80)													
Mid-range																		EL / EL2 /ELW						FE					FE2							F-601M (N6000)				F70 (N70)						F80 (N80)													
Mid-range											FT		FTn/ FT2/ FT3										FM					FM2																			FM3A												
Mid-range											FS												FM					FM2																			FM3A												
Entry-level																																																											
Entry-level																																										Pronea S																	
Entry-level																																									Pronea 600i/6i																		
Entry-level								Nikkorex F / Nikkor J																	EM			FG			F-301 (N2000)				F-401s (N4004s)					F50 (N50)							F65 (N65 / U)		F75 (N75 / U2)										
Entry-level						35		35 II		Auto 35																				FG-20			F-401 (N4004)				F-401x (N5005)								F60 (N60)			F55 (N55)											
Entry-level									Zoom 35																																FM10 / FE10																		
Class	55	56	57	58	59	60	61	62	63	64	65	66	67	68	69	70	71	72	73	74	75	76	77	78	79	80	81	82	83	84	85	86	87	88	89	90	91	92	93	94	95	96	97	98	99	00	01	02	03	04	05	06	07	08	09	...	20	21	22
Class	1950s					1960s										1970s										1980s										1990s										2000s										2020s			
