= Nikon F65 =

135-film camera model

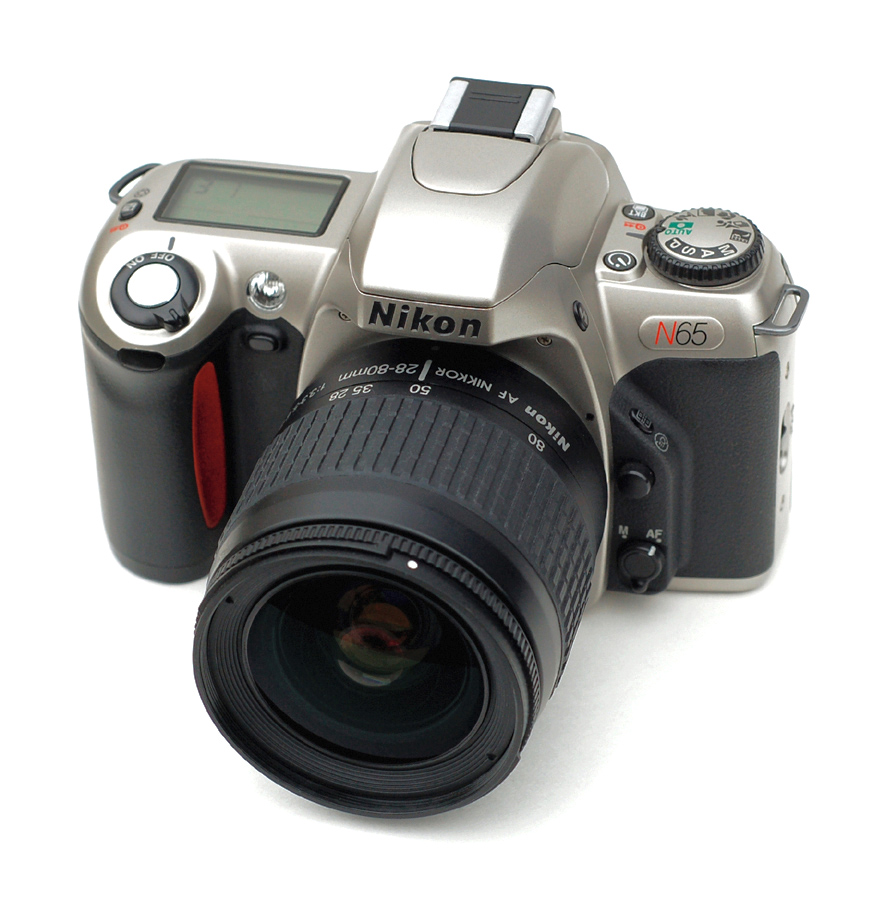
Nikon N65 camera with lens attached

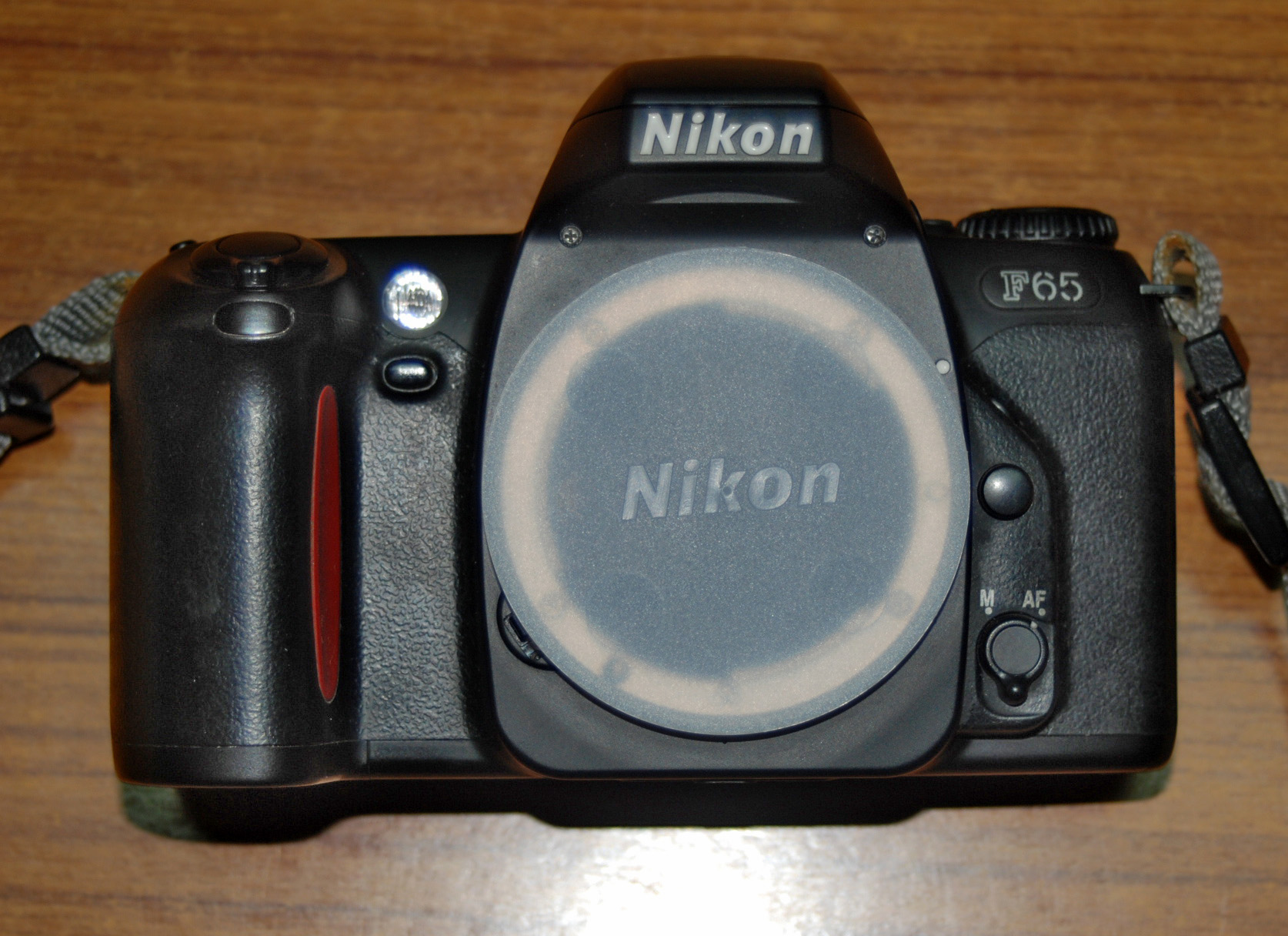
Nikon F65 camera body

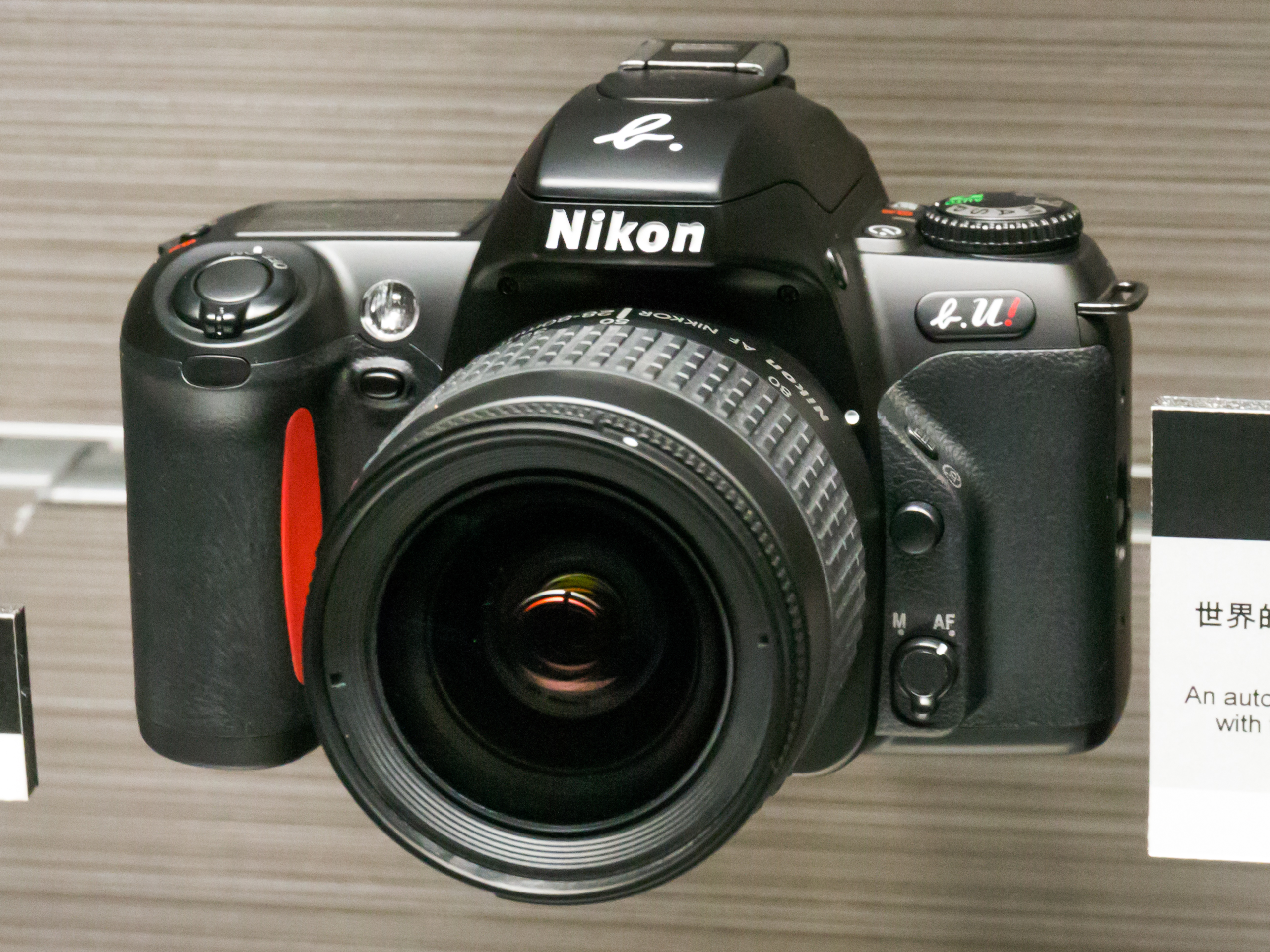
A special edition of the Nikon U released in association with agnès b.

The F65 (known as the Nikon N65 in the U.S. and the Nikon U in Japan) is a 35mm film SLR camera introduced by Nikon in 2001.

== History and design ==
Like its predecessor, the F60, the F65 was aimed at the lower end of the amateur autofocus SLR market.

Its features included autofocus, various forms of TTL light metering and different operating modes. It also included depth-of-field preview and remote-shutter release, two facilities notably absent in the F60.

The F65D variant featured a date/time-imprinting facility.

In 2002, the F65 was joined by the F55, which was targeted at a new, lower price point, and was replaced by the F75 in 2003.

== Features ==
- 14 oz polycarbonate body
- Exposure modes: Auto-Multi Program, five Vari-Program modes, Shutter priority, Aperture Priority and full manual mode
- Built-in flash (GN 40) with Auto, Slow and Rear sync modes
- 5-point matrix CAM900 autofocus sensor
- Shutter speeds from 1/2000s to 30s and Bulb mode
- Supports DX-coded film up to ISO 5000

Class	1950s			1960s										1970s										1980s										1990s										2000s										2020s			
Class	57	58	59	60	61	62	63	64	65	66	67	68	69	70	71	72	73	74	75	76	77	78	79	80	81	82	83	84	85	86	87	88	89	90	91	92	93	94	95	96	97	98	99	00	01	02	03	04	05	06	07	08	09	...	20	21	22
Profes- sional			F																					F3																																	
Profes- sional															F2												F3AF					F4								F5								F6									
High- end																											FA					F-801 (N8008)/ F-801s (N8008s)				F90 (N90)		F90X (N90s)					F100														
Mid- range																														F-501 (N2020)				F-601 (N6006)				F70 (N70)						F80 (N80)													
Mid- range																EL / EL2 /ELW						FE					FE2							F-601M (N6000)				F70 (N70)						F80 (N80)													
Mid- range									FT		FTn/ FT2/ FT3										FM					FM2/FM2n																			FM3A												
Mid- range									FS												FM					FM2/FM2n																			FM3A												
Entry- level																																																									
Entry- level																																										Pronea S															
Entry- level																																								Pronea 600i/6i																	
Entry- level						Nikkorex F / Nikkor J																	EM			FG			F-301 (N2000)				F-401s (N4004s)					F50 (N50)							F65 (N65 / U)		F75 (N75 / U2)										
Entry- level				35		35 II		Auto 35																				FG-20			F-401 (N4004)				F-401x (N5005)								F60 (N60)			F55 (N55)											
Entry- level							Zoom 35																																FM10 / FE10																		
Class	57	58	59	60	61	62	63	64	65	66	67	68	69	70	71	72	73	74	75	76	77	78	79	80	81	82	83	84	85	86	87	88	89	90	91	92	93	94	95	96	97	98	99	00	01	02	03	04	05	06	07	08	09	...	20	21	22
Class	1950s			1960s										1970s										1980s										1990s										2000s										2020s			
