= Nikon Df =

Digital single-lens reflex camera

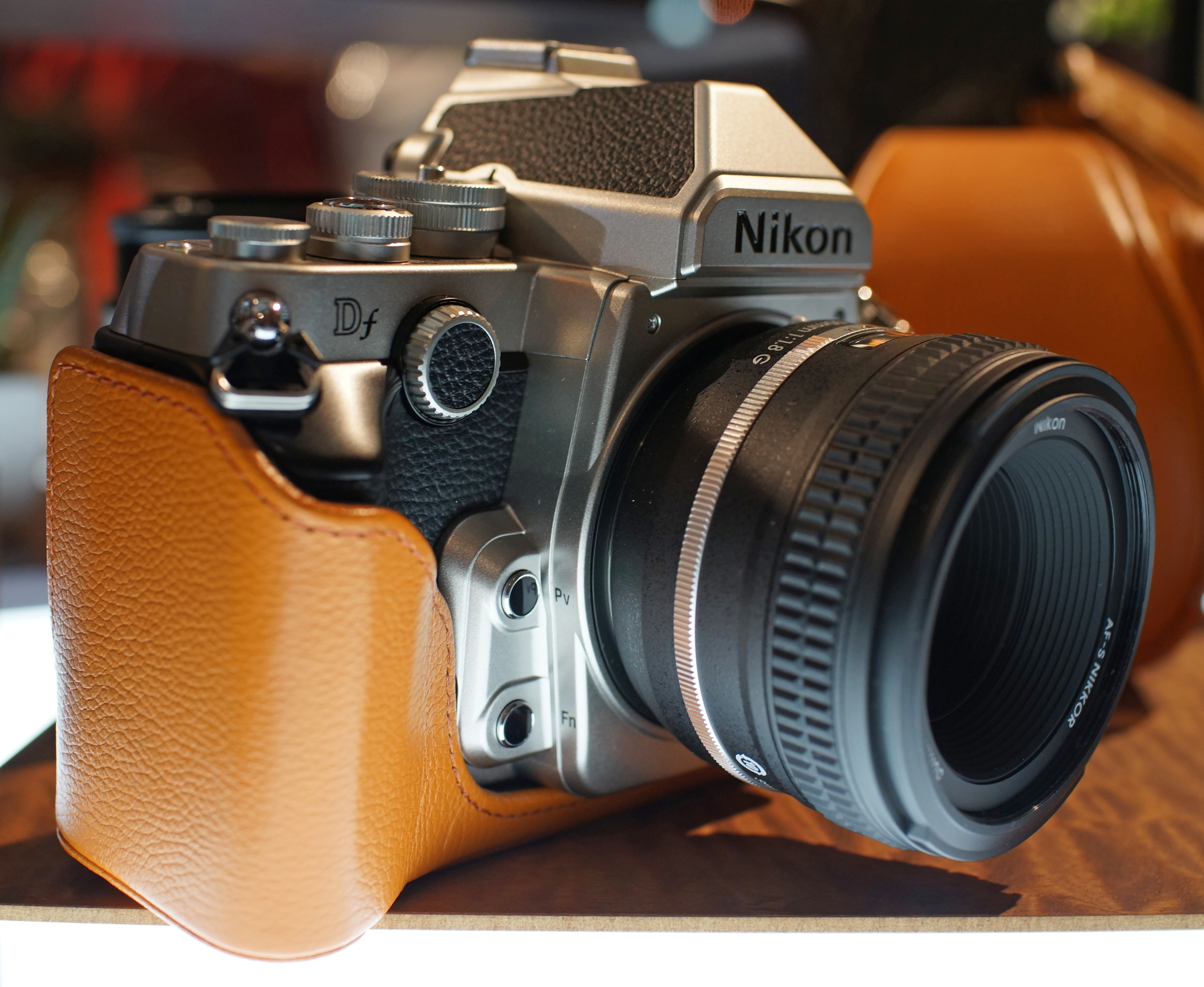

Overview
- Maker: Nikon Corporation
- Type: Digital single-lens reflex camera
- Released: 2013
- Production: 2013-11-05 through 2021-04 (7 years 5 months)

Lens
- Lens: Interchangeable, Nikon F-mount

Sensor/medium
- Sensor: 36.0 mm × 23.9 mm CMOS, Nikon FX format, 7.3 µm pixel size
- Maximum resolution: 4928 × 3280 pixels (16.2 megapixels)
- Film speed: ISO equivalency 100-12800, Boost: 50-204800
- Storage media: One SD, SDHC, SDXC compatible

Focusing
- Focus modes: Auto AF-S/AF-C selection (AF-A), Continuous-servo (AF-C), Manual (M) with electronic rangefinder, Single-servo AF (AF-S)
- Focus areas: 39-area Nikon Advanced Multi-CAM 4800
- Focus bracketing: none

Exposure/metering
- Exposure modes: Programmed Auto [P], Shutter-Priority Auto [S], Aperture-Priority Auto [A], Manual [M]
- Exposure metering: TTL exposure metering using 2,016-pixel RGB sensor
- Metering modes: Center-weighted: Weight of 75% given to 12mm circle in center of frame; Matrix: 3D color matrix metering III (type G, E, and D lenses); color matrix metering III (other CPU lenses); Spot: Meters 4 mm circle (about 1.5% of frame) centered on selected focus point

Flash
- Flash: none built-in
- Flash bracketing: 2-5 frames in steps of 1/3, 2/3, 1, 2, or 3 EV

Shutter
- Shutter: Electronically controlled vertical-travel focal-plane shutter
- Shutter speed range: 30 to 1/4000 second and bulb
- Continuous shooting: 5.5 frame/s

Viewfinder
- Viewfinder: Optical-type fixed eye level pentaprism

Image processing
- White balance: Auto, Presets (5), Manual, and Color temperature in kelvins
- WB bracketing: 2 to 3 exposures in increments of 1, 2 or 3 EV

General
- LCD screen: 3.2-inch diagonal, (921,000 dots), TFT LCD
- Battery: Li-ion EN-EL14a or EN-EL14
- Weight: 710 g (25 oz) (1.57 lb)
- Latest firmware: 1.03 / 12 June 2018; 8 years ago
- Made in: Japan

Chronology
- Successor: Nikon Zfc; Nikon Zf

The Nikon Df is a full-frame F-mount DSLR FX format camera announced by Nikon on November 5, 2013. It uses dedicated mechanical controls similar to those used on mechanical 35mm film SLR camera and has an appearance similar to the Nikon FM, Nikon FM2, Nikon FE, Nikon FE2, and Nikon FA film cameras. Nikon's website stated "Using its large, metallic mechanical dials, photographers will rediscover a more direct connection with their camera."

It has the same sensor overall score 89 of DxOMark with Nikon D4, the Nikon Df (at time of release) ranked first in a low-light test with 3279 ISO (Nikon D4 with 2965 ISO), but in practice the difference was small.

In a departure from the rest of Nikon's DSLR lineup, the Df does not record video, only still images; while most reviews were generally positive, this and other built-in limitations of the camera were seen as negatives. Also notable by their absence is a built-in flash and a variety of automatic modes, though the backward lens compatibility extends to nearly the entirety of the Nikon lineup since 1959.

== Features ==
- Same FX-format CMOS sensor and EXPEED 3 image-processing engine as the Nikon D4
- Unlike other modern F-mount cameras, the Nikon Df has an adjustable metering coupling lever that can be folded back to allow the mounting of early F-mount manual-focus lenses, such as Non-AI, without damage. It can be deployed for metering coupling with AI lenses.
Metering coupling lever folded back

Metering coupling lever deployed

== Problems ==
- Nikon DF - AF Problem with Sigma Lenses

== See also ==
- Nikon Zf
- Nikon Zfc
- List of retro-style digital cameras

Sensor	Class	1999	2000	2001	2002	2003	2004	2005	2006	2007	2008	2009	2010	2011	2012	2013	2014	2015	2016	2017	2018	2019	2020	2021	2022	2023	2024	2025	2026
FX (Full-frame)	Flagship											D3X ^{−P}																	
FX (Full-frame)	Flagship										D3 ^{−P}		D3S ^{−P}		D4		D4S		D5^{T}					D6^{T}					
FX (Full-frame)	Professional											D700 ^{−P}			D800/D800E			D810/D810A			D850 ^{AT}								
FX (Full-frame)	Enthusiast																Df												
FX (Full-frame)	Enthusiast																	D750 ^{A}					D780 ^{AT}						
FX (Full-frame)	Enthusiast															D600	D610												
DX (APS-C)	Flagship		D1^{−E}	D1X^{−E}				D2X^{−E}		D2Xs^{−E}																			
DX (APS-C)	Flagship		D1^{−E}	D1H ^{−E}			D2H^{−E}	D2Hs^{−E}																					
DX (APS-C)	Professional				D100^{−E}				D200^{−E}		D300^{−P}		D300S^{−P}						D500 ^{AT}										
DX (APS-C)	Enthusiast						D70^{−E}		D70s^{−E}	D80^{−E}		D90^{−E}		D7000 ^{−P}			D7100	D7200			D7500 ^{AT}								
DX (APS-C)	Upper-entry								D50^{−E}	D40X^{−E*}	D60^{−E*}		D5000^{A−P*}		D5100^{A−P*}	D5200^{A−P*}	D5300^{A*}	D5500^{AT*}		D5600 ^{AT*}									
DX (APS-C)	Entry-level									D40^{−E*}			D3000^{−E*}	D3100^{−P*}		D3200^{−P*}	D3300^{*}			D3400^{*}		D3500^{*}							
Early models		SVC (prototype; 1986); QV-1000C (1988); NASA F4 (1991); E2/E2S (1995); E2N/E2NS (1996); E3/E3S (1998)																											
Sensor	Class																												
Sensor	Class	1999	2000	2001	2002	2003	2004	2005	2006	2007	2008	2009	2010	2011	2012	2013	2014	2015	2016	2017	2018	2019	2020	2021	2022	2023	2024	2025	2026
