= FMS =

FMS may refer to:

== Organizations ==
=== Education ===
- Faculty of Management Studies, one of several schools
- Farmington Municipal Schools, in New Mexico, United States
- Florida Military School, United States
- Fuchs Mizrachi School, in Beachwood, Ohio, United States

=== Government ===
- Federal Magistrates Service, now the Federal Magistrates' Court of Australia
- Federal Migration Service (Russian Federation)
- Federated Malay States, a historical British protectorate in then British Malaya
- Fiji Meteorological Service
- Financial Management Service, a bureau of the United States Treasury Department
- Foreign Military Sales, a program of the United States Department of Defense

=== Other organizations ===
- Fatima Memorial System, a healthcare complex in Lahore, Pakistan
- Finnish Missionary Society
- Fisichella Motor Sport, an Italian motor racing team
- Marist Brothers (Latin: Fratres Maristae a Scholis), a Catholic religious order

== Science and technology ==
=== Health and medicine ===
- False memory syndrome
- Fibromyalgia syndrome
- Facial masculinization surgery

=== Technology ===
- Fiber Management System, hardware for managing fiber networks
- Fixed Mobile Substitution, the use of a mobile phone (cellular phone) instead of a fixed line
- Flash Media Server, a proprietary data and media server from Adobe Systems
- Fleet management software
- Fleet Management System, automotive industry software
- Flexible manufacturing system
- Flight management system, a fundamental component of a modern airliner's avionics
- Fluhrer, Mantin and Shamir attack, a cryptographic attack on the RC4 stream cipher
- FORTRAN Monitor System, a batch processing operating system
- Freenet Messaging System, part of the Freenet peer-to-peer platform
- Fuel management systems, including hardware and software
- FMSLogo, an interpreter for the logo programming language
- Pandora FMS, network monitoring software

== Other uses ==
- "FMS" (song), by American hip hop duo New Boyz
- Final Multiple Score, used by the United States Navy
- Financial Management Standard, in Queensland, Australia

== See also ==
- FM (disambiguation)
