= FE2 =

FE2 may refer to:

- Nikon FE2, a 35mm SLR camera produced from 1983 to 1987
- Royal Aircraft Factory F.E.2, three different British fighter aircraft made during World War I

== See also ==
- Fire Emblem Gaiden, the second game in the Fire Emblem series
