= FM =

FM or Fm may refer to:

== Technology and computing ==
- Adobe FrameMaker, document processing software
- .fm, country-code top-level domain of the Federated States of Micronesia
- FM Towns, Fujitsu personal computers
- Foundation model, a large machine learning model trained on vast datasets
- Frequency modulation, a radio broadcasting technology
  - FM broadcasting
  - FM broadcast band
- Nissan FM platform, a car layout
- Volvo FM, heavy truck range

== Science and medicine ==
- Femtometre (fm), a unit of length
- Femtomolar (fM), a unit of molar concentration
- Fermium, (Fm) a chemical element
- FM (chemotherapy) regimen
- Family medicine

== Sports and games ==
- FIDE Master, a chess title
- Formula Mazda, in car racing
- Football Manager, a video game series
- Forza Motorsport, a video game series

== Film and television ==
- FM (film), 1978
- FM Fun Aur Masti or FM, 2007 film
- FM (TV channel), US
- FM (American TV series), 1989–1990
- FM (British TV series), 2009

== Literature ==
- F.M. (novel), by Boris Akunin
- Famous Monsters of Filmland, magazine
- Code for United States Army Field Manuals

== Music ==
=== Musical artists ===
- FM (British band) (known in the US as FM UK)
- FM (Canadian band)
- FM Static, a Canadian rock duo
- Far East Movement, a band from Los Angeles

=== Other uses in music ===
- FM (soundtrack) to the 1978 film FM
  - "FM (No Static at All)", a song from the soundtrack
- FM Records, a record label
- "FM" (short for "frequent mutilation"), a song by The Slits
- FM (EP), 2015, by South Korean Crayon Pop
- FM!, a 2018 album by Vince Staples
- F minor, chords and scale
- FM (album), 2006, by the Turkish band Replikas

== Businesses and organizations ==
- First Manhattan, a New York-based financial management company
- FM Global, a mutual insurance company
- Franklin & Marshall College or F&M, Lancaster, Pennsylvania, U.S.
- Future Movement, a Lebanese political party
- Shanghai Airlines, IATA code

== People, jobs, characters ==
- FM-2030 (1930–2000), transhumanist philosopher

=== Titles ===
- Field marshal, an army rank
- First Minister
- Finance Minister
- Foreign Minister

== Places ==
- Federated States of Micronesia (ISO 3166-1 country code, FIPS PUB 10-4 territory code, and postal code)
- Province of Fermo, Italy, vehicle registration code
- Fayetteville-Manlius Central School District (F-M), Syracuse, New York, U.S.

== Other uses ==
- Facility management, of logistics for buildings
- Farm-to-market road (FM), a designator for roads in Texas, US
- NHK FM, a Japanese radio station
- Nikon FM, a Nikon 35mm film camera
- Fusil-mitrailleur, a light machine gun, usually referring to an FM 24/29 light machine gun

== See also ==
- F&M (disambiguation)
- FMS (disambiguation)
