= Nikon FM3A =

2001 35mm single-lens reflex camera

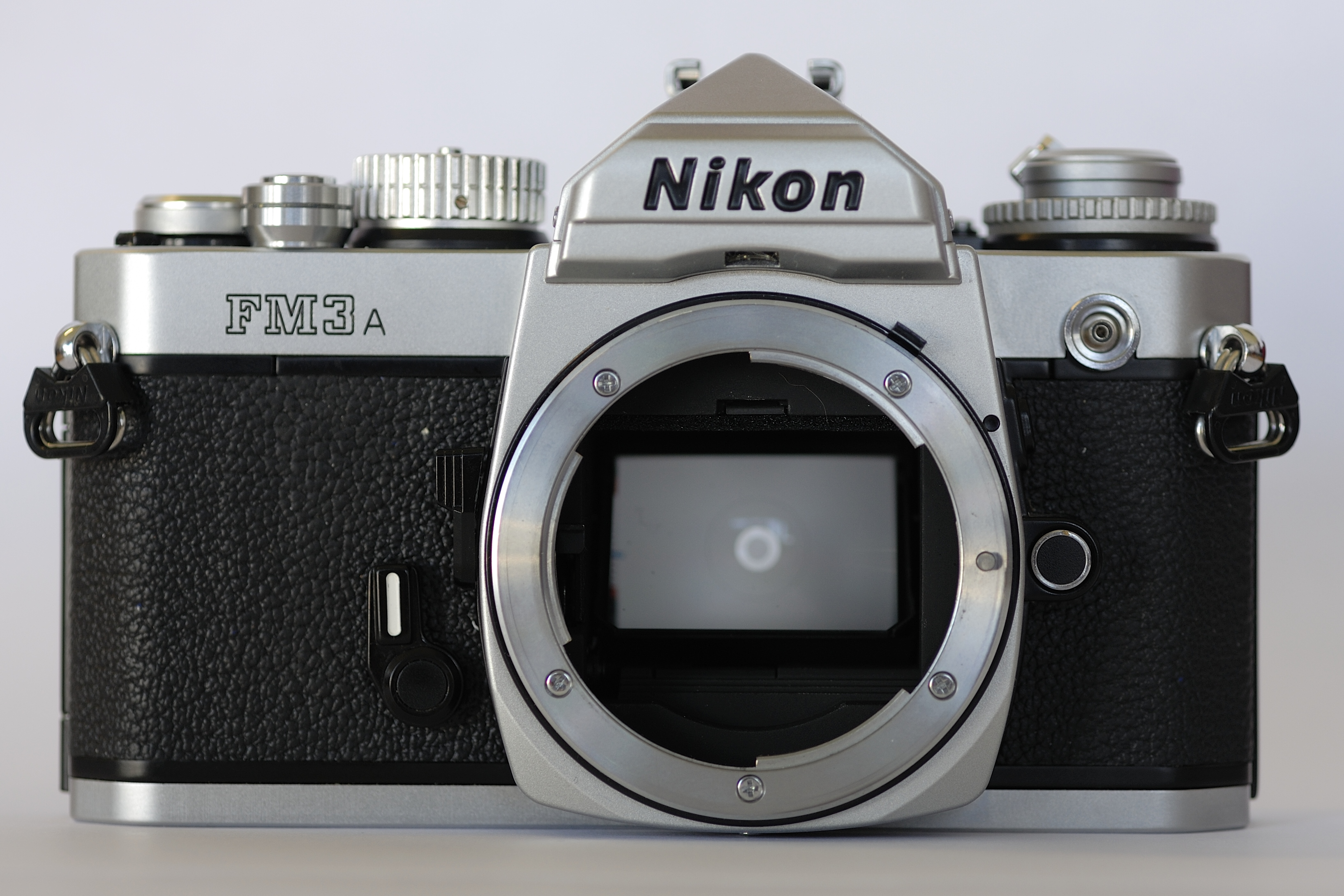

Overview
- Maker: Nikon Corporation
- Type: Single-lens reflex
- Released: 2001
- Production: July 2001 - January 2006; 4 years 7 months
- Intro price: $820 (chrome finish, body only)

Lens
- Lens: interchangeable lens, Nikon F-mount
- Compatible lenses: Nikon F-mount lenses supporting automatic indexing (AI) with some exceptions

Sensor/medium
- Film format: 35 mm
- Film size: 36 mm × 24 mm
- Film speed: ISO 25 to 5000 (DX); ISO 12 to 6400 (manual)
- Film speed detection: Automatic selection
- Film advance: manual
- Film rewind: manual

Focusing
- Focus modes: manual

Exposure/metering
- Exposure modes: Aperture priority, Manual
- Exposure metering: silicon photodiode light meter, TTL full aperture metering, EV 1 to EV 20 (f/1.4 at 1s to f/16 at 1/1000s at ASA/ISO 100 and with 50 mm f/1.4 lens
- Metering modes: 60/40 percent centerweighted

Flash
- Flash: hot shoe, JIS synch connection
- Flash exposure compensation: -1EV flash compensation button
- Flash synchronization: 1/250 s
- Compatible flashes: Dedicated Nikon hot shoe mounted flashes with TTL capability; other non-dedicated hot shoe flashes; non-hot shoe flashes

Shutter
- Shutter: hybrid electronic and mechanical
- Shutter speed range: 8 s to 1/4000 s [A]; 1 s to 1/4000 s [mechanical]; Bulb
- Continuous shooting: 3.2 frame/s (High), 2 frame/s (Low) with MD-12

Viewfinder
- Viewfinder: eye-level pentaprism
- Viewfinder magnification: 0.83×
- Frame coverage: 93%

General
- Battery: 1x 3V CR1/3N lithium, or; 2x 1.5V LR44 alkaline, or; 2x 1.55V SR44 silver-oxide
- Optional data backs: MF-16, MF-12
- Optional motor drives: MD-12
- Dimensions: 142.5×90×58 mm (5.61×3.54×2.28 in)
- Weight: 570 g (20 oz)
- Made in: Japan

Chronology
- Predecessor: Nikon FM2n

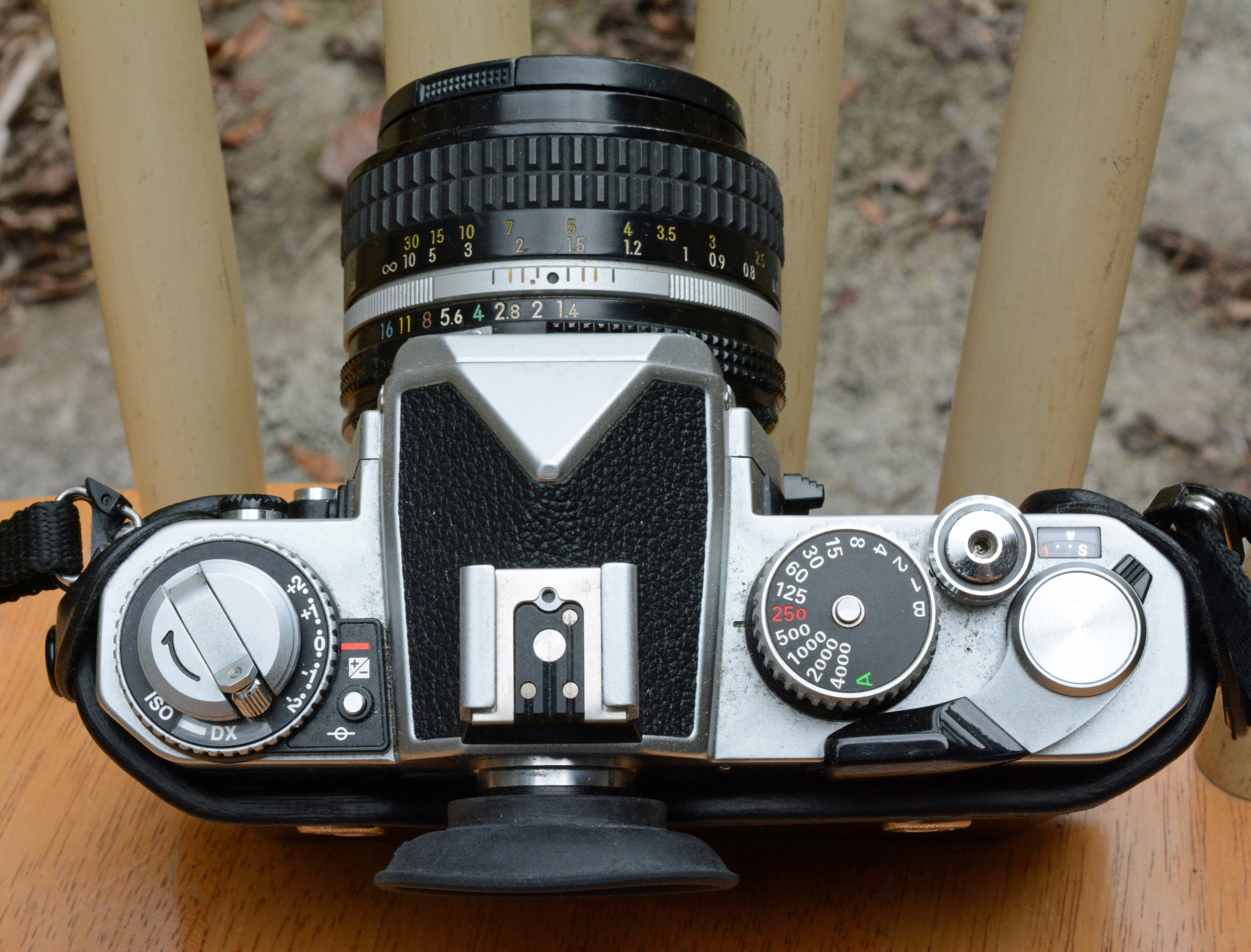
Nikon FM3A SLR, top view

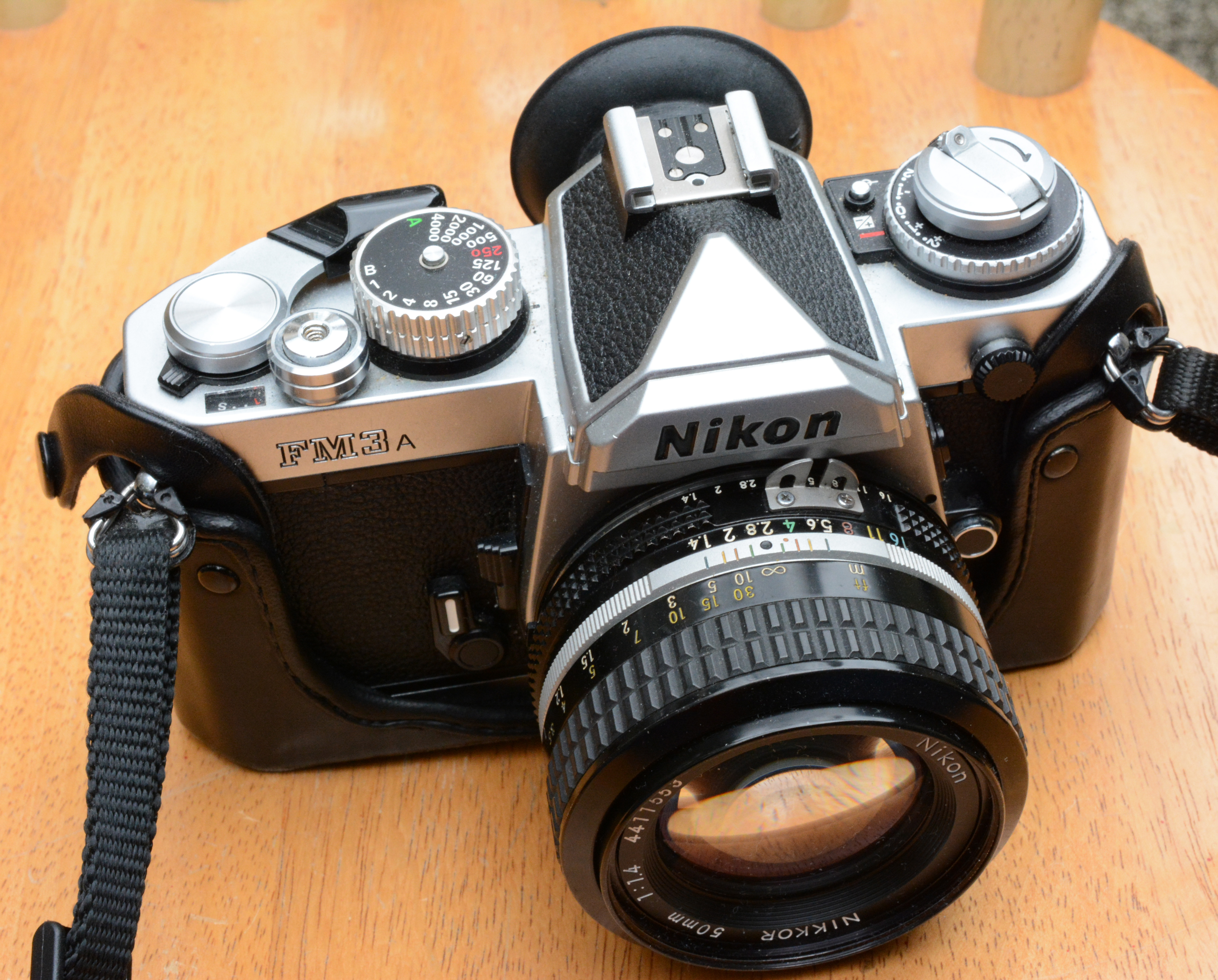
Nikon FM3A SLR with 50mm lens

The Nikon FM3A is an interchangeable-lens, focal-plane shutter, 35 mm film, single-lens reflex (SLR) camera. It was manufactured by Nikon Corporation in Japan on small-volume assembly lines, from 2001 to 2006. The camera was available in two colours: all black and satin chrome. The introductory US list price for the chrome body only (no lens) was $820.

The FM3A was the successor to the renowned Nikon FM2N camera of 1984 and was the last member of the successful, semi-professional line of Nikon compact 35 mm film SLRs. The other members were the Nikon FM (released 1977), FE (1978), FM2 (1982) and FE2 (1983). They (and the Nikon FA) all used the superficially similar (but not identical) rugged copper-silumin alloy chassis and high-quality Nikon vertical bearing-mounted metal shutter and ball-bearing mounted film advance, but with improved feature levels, minor external controls and cosmetic differences. The newer low-budget Nikon FM10 and FE10, while named similarly, are completely different introductory-level cameras manufactured by Cosina.

The major improvements in the FM3A compared to the FM2n are the hybrid electro-mechanically controlled aluminium-bladed focal plane shutter, the aperture priority auto-exposure mode, the match-needle exposure control system and provision for through-the-lens (TTL) off-the-film (OTF) electronic flash automation. In other words, the FM3A merged the robust mechanical systems of the FM2n with the proven, reliable electronic exposure controls of the FE2.

== Features ==
The FM3A is built to a high level of workmanship and material quality. It shares the advantages of the FM and the FM2n, both generally regarded as two of the most reliable cameras ever built in terms of operation under extreme conditions as well as day-to-day reliability reports from repair shops and magazine surveys. It has an extremely strong body of copper silumin alloy. The electronics are well protected within the body and of extremely high quality, including the flexible circuits. The FM3A's film transport consists of high-strength hardened metal gears and moving parts, mounted on clusters of ball bearings. The vertical metal shutter utilises precision tapered high-strength aluminium alloy blades and oilless self-lubricating bearings. The guide rails are made of stainless steel. The mirror is made of titanium. It is large to reduce chances of vignetting with super-telephotos of up to 800 mm, and uses the same mechanism found on Nikon's pro F2, with some improvements designed to further reduce effects of vibration and mirror bounce.

The FM3A accepts all of the Nikkor lenses with the Nikon F bayonet mount that support the Automatic Indexing (AI) feature (AI, AIS), first introduced in 1977. The chrome FM3A was often sold in a kit that includes a color coordinated chrome finished Nikkor 45 mm f/2.8P lens. This special flat "pancake" lens was manually focused on the FM3A, but contained a CPU which could communicate focal distance to Nikon's later autofocus (AF) camera bodies.

Other accessories for the FM3A include the Nikon MD-12 motor drive (automatic film advance up to 3.2 frames per second), as well as the Nikon MF-16 databack (sequential numbering, time or date stamping on the film), and the various compatible Nikon TTL flashes (SB-15, SB-16b, SB-20, etc.)

In manual mode, the camera is completely mechanical in operation, and only requires batteries for the light metering information system. In aperture priority mode, the batteries continued to power the meter, but are also utilized for shutter timing and the exposure control electronics. The FM3A's metering information system consisted of a match-needle system using two needles pointing along a vertical shutter speed scale on the left side of the viewfinder to indicate the readings of the built-in 60/40% centerweighted silicon photodiode light meter versus the actual camera settings. This system can be traced back to the Nikkormat EL (Nikomat EL in Japan) of 1972. The viewfinder also has Nikon's fully interchangeable bright focus screen with various options for focus.

== Design history ==
During the mid-1990s, a demand arose among some photographers for a quality manual-focus alternative to the 35 mm autofocus SLR camera. These cameras required complex computer and processing mechanisms and, especially in their amateur and consumer versions, were not known for their ruggedness or a long service life. Nikon owners began to demand a durable, precision-made camera with the AE electronic features and prized construction of the discontinued Nikon FE2, which had begun to skyrocket in value on the secondhand market. Nikon responded to this phenomenon with a revival of their classic FM/FE series design.

The FM3A's expensive construction and conservative design were not intended to appeal to the consumer-level market. Nikon instead marketed the camera to serious amateur and professional photographers who wanted the highest possible quality and precision of control, and a service life estimated not in years, but decades.

The FM3A's introduction coincided with a major technological revolution in photographic technology – digital imaging. Many photographers, professional and amateur alike, switched to digital, resulting in a huge decrease in film SLR sales. By 2004, annual sales of digital cameras had surpassed those of film cameras. Though FM3A sales remained steady, they were minuscule in volume compared to Nikon's other cameras, and steadily increasing costs forced Nikon to announce the discontinuation of the FM3A on 11 January 2006, leaving only the expensive and heavily electronic Nikon F6 and the inexpensively built Nikon FM10 in Nikon's 35mm film SLR line. Since the announcement of the FM3A's discontinuance, value on the secondhand market of the FM3A camera (and its FM2 predecessors) appreciably increased; this is especially true of the black model. As of 2014, the price for a Mint or Near Mint FM3A are as high as the new price (around 800 - 900 Euro in 2001). This makes this camera to be one of the most price-stable 35mm SLRs.

Class	1950s			1960s										1970s										1980s										1990s										2000s										2020s			
Class	57	58	59	60	61	62	63	64	65	66	67	68	69	70	71	72	73	74	75	76	77	78	79	80	81	82	83	84	85	86	87	88	89	90	91	92	93	94	95	96	97	98	99	00	01	02	03	04	05	06	07	08	09	...	20	21	22
Profes- sional			F																					F3																																	
Profes- sional															F2												F3AF					F4								F5								F6									
High- end																											FA					F-801 (N8008)/ F-801s (N8008s)				F90 (N90)		F90X (N90s)					F100														
Mid- range																														F-501 (N2020)				F-601 (N6006)				F70 (N70)						F80 (N80)													
Mid- range																EL / EL2 /ELW						FE					FE2							F-601M (N6000)				F70 (N70)						F80 (N80)													
Mid- range									FT		FTn/ FT2/ FT3										FM					FM2/FM2n																			FM3A												
Mid- range									FS												FM					FM2/FM2n																			FM3A												
Entry- level																																																									
Entry- level																																								Pronea 600i/6i																	
Entry- level																																										Pronea S															
Entry- level						Nikkorex F / Nikkor J																	EM			FG			F-301 (N2000)				F-401s (N4004s)					F50 (N50)							F65 (N65 / U)		F75 (N75 / U2)										
Entry- level				35		35 II		Auto 35																				FG-20			F-401 (N4004)				F-401x (N5005)								F60 (N60)			F55 (N55)											
Entry- level							Zoom 35																																FM10 / FE10																		
Class	57	58	59	60	61	62	63	64	65	66	67	68	69	70	71	72	73	74	75	76	77	78	79	80	81	82	83	84	85	86	87	88	89	90	91	92	93	94	95	96	97	98	99	00	01	02	03	04	05	06	07	08	09	...	20	21	22
Class	1950s			1960s										1970s										1980s										1990s										2000s										2020s			
