= F&M =

F&M may refer to:

- F&M Brewery, a microbrewery in Guelph, Ontario, Canada
- Fortnum & Mason, an upmarket department store in London, England
- Franklin & Marshall College, a liberal arts college in Pennsylvania, USA
- F&M, a drugstore chain formerly owned by Drug Emporium
- F & M, a 2019 album by German-Swedish duo Lindemann
- Fujiya & Miyagi, an English electronic music band
- Foot-and-mouth disease

== See also ==
- FM (disambiguation)
- F&M Bank (disambiguation)
