= Final Multiple Score =

Final Multiple Score, or FMS, is a calculation used by the United States Navy to determine whether or not enlisted sailors of the paygrades E-3, E-4, E-5, or E-6 are eligible to advance to the next paygrade. It involves six different categories, some of which are given more weight such as "Performance Mark Average" (PMA) and exam score, producing a total sum that is used to compare other sailors during an annual (E7) or semi-annual (E4-E6) advancement cycle.

In 2018, the Navy changed the computation of the FMS by updating the PMA calculation for E6 & E7 exams. The "RSCA PMA" compares the sailor's Individual Trait Average (ITA) on an exam qualifying EVAL against the Reporting Senior's Cumulative Average (RSCA) within that same EVAL. This new calculation can raise the value of an individual EVAL by as many as 1.8 points.

The changes in 2018 also removed the possible two award points for Individual Augmentees (IAs), as well as adjusting the "Service in Pay Grade" (SIPG) calculation. This new calculation takes a sailors SIPG and divides by a factor of 5 with a new maximum of two (E4/E5) or three (E6).

The last change was to the maximum "Passed but Not Advanced" (PNA) points. Starting with the 2019 advancement cycles, your PNA total will only add your collected PNA points from the previous three exam cycles at your current exam rank. The max PNA points is adjusted to 9 points as the new rule will not take away PNA points already accrued through the old standing maximum allowance.

The following chart is used to produce the final multiple:

Factor	Paygrade	Computation	E-4/E-5	E-6	E-7
Performance	E-4/E-5	(PMA x 80)-256	64 (38%)		
	E-6	(RSCA PMA x 30)-60		114 (51%)	
	E-7	(RSCA PMA x 30)-54			120 (60%)
Standard Score	All	Exam Score on profile sheet	80 (47%)	80 (36%)	80 (40%)
Service in Paygrade	E-4/E-5	SIPG/5	2 (1%)		
Service in Paygrade	E-6	SIPG/5		3 (1%)	
PNA Points	E-4 to E-6	PNA points from last 3 cycles	9 (6%)	9 (4%)	
Education	E-4 to E-6	2 AA/AS or 4 BA/BS	4 (2%)	4 (2%)	
Awards	E-4 to E-6	Values in Navy Advancement Manual	10 (6%)	12 (6%)	
Maximum Points Possible			169	222	200

PMA is Performance Mark Average
PNA is Passed Not Advanced points
SIPG is Service in Paygrade
AA/AS is associate degree
BA/BS is bachelor's degree

== See also ==
- Petty Officer
- U.S. Navy enlisted rate insignia
