= Nikon FA =

1983 35mm single-lens reflex camera

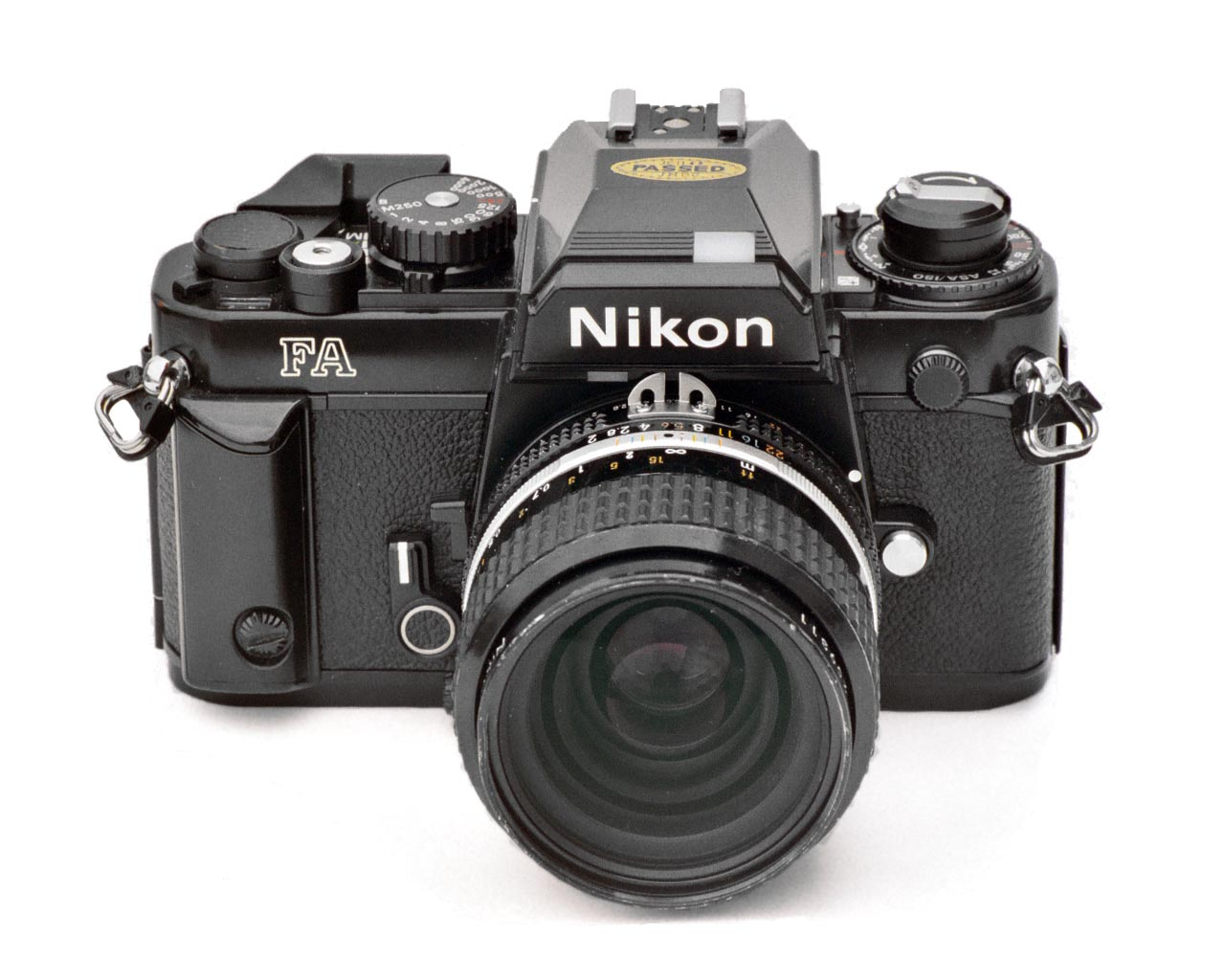

Overview
- Maker: Nippon Kogaku
- Type: 35 mm SLR
- Released: 1983
- Production: 1983-1987

Lens
- Lens mount: Nikon F-mount

Sensor/medium
- Film size: 36 mm × 24 mm
- Film speed: ISO 12 to 3200

Focusing
- Focus: Manual

Exposure/metering
- Exposure: High Speed Program, Program, Shutter priority, Aperture priority, Manual
- Metering modes: Matrix, Centerweighted

Flash
- Flash: Hot shoe
- Flash synchronization: 1/250 s

Shutter
- Shutter: electronically controlled
- Shutter speed range: 1-1/4000s, 1/250s mechanical backup, Bulb

General
- Battery: Either two LR44, two SR44 batteries, or one 3V CR 1/3N.
- Dimensions: 92×142.5×64.5 mm (3.62×5.61×2.54 in)
- Weight: 625 g (22 oz)
- Made in: Japan

The Nikon FA is an advanced amateur-level, interchangeable lens, 35 mm film, single-lens reflex (SLR) camera. It was manufactured by the Japanese optics company Nippon Kogaku K. K. (Nikon Corporation since 1988) in Japan from 1983 to 1987 (available new from dealer stock until circa 1989). The FA used a titanium-bladed, vertical-travel Nikon-designed, Copal-made focal plane shutter with a speed range of 1 to 1/4000th second plus Bulb and flash X-sync of 1/250th second. It was available in two colors: black with chrome trim and all black. The introductory US list price for the chrome body only (no lens) was $646. Note that SLRs usually sold for 30 to 40 percent below list price.

The FA was the most sophisticated member of the remarkably long-lived, classic Nikon compact F-series SLRs and was built upon a compact but rugged copper-aluminum alloy chassis developed from the ones used by the earlier Nikon FM (introduced in 1977), FE (1978), FM2 (1982) and FE2 (1983) cameras. The FM/FE series have only minor external controls and cosmetic differences, but the FA had a distinctly chunkier body and larger, boxier pentaprism cover to house its extra electronics. The limited-production Nikon FM3A of 2001 continued to use this body design until 2006.

The Nikon FA is a historically significant camera. It was the first camera to offer a multi-segmented (or matrix or evaluative) exposure light meter, called Automatic Multi-Pattern (AMP). It had a built-in microprocessor computer programmed to automatically analyze different segments of the light meter field of view and select a corrected exposure. Virtually all cameras today, whether film, video or digital, have some sort of matrix metering.

The Nikon FA was Nippon Kogaku's high-technology standard bearer, sandwiched between the sturdy, but basic Nikon FE2 and the professional-level Nikon F3 SLR (introduced in 1980). With its advanced AMP meter, Nippon Kogaku fully expected that many professional photographers, as well as amateurs, would buy it.

== Features ==
The FA accepted all lenses with the Nikon F bayonet mount (introduced in 1959) supporting the Automatic Indexing-Shutter (AI-S) feature (introduced in 1981). The contemporary Nippon Kogaku AI-S lenses were the Nikkor AI-S, and Nikon Series E types. The AF-S Nikkor, AF-I Nikkor, AF Nikkor D and AF Nikkor autofocus lenses are also AI-S types, which will work too but for manual focus only.

The FA could also use the older Nikkor AI (introduced in 1977) and AI'd Nikkor lenses, but in that case, the AMP meter and the shutter priority and High Speed program autoexposure modes would not work as well as AI-S lenses allowed (this is due to their non-linear aperture stop-down mechanisms).

Nikon's most recent 35 mm film SLR lenses are not fully compatible with the FA: the AF Nikkor G type (introduced in 2000) lacks an aperture control ring, and the AF Nikkor DX type (2003), with image circles sized for Nikon's digital SLRs, will mount, but will not function properly. IX Nikkor lenses (1996), for Nikon's Advanced Photo System (APS) film SLRs, must not be mounted, as their rear elements will intrude far enough into the mirror box to cause damage.

During the early 1980s, Nippon Kogaku manufactured approximately 70 manual focus Nikkor AI-S and Nikon Series E branded lenses. They ranged from a Fisheye-Nikkor 6 mm f/2.8 220˚ circular fisheye to a Reflex-Nikkor 2000 mm f/11 super telephoto. This was the largest and widest ranging lens selection in the world by far.

Major accessories for the FA included the Nikon MD-15 motor drive (automatic film advance up to 3.2 frames per second, plus power for the camera electronics), the Nikon MF-16 databack (sequential numbering, time or date stamping on the film), and the Nikon Speedlight SB-15 (guide number 82/25 (feet/meters) at ASA/ISO 100) and Nikon Speedlight SB-16B (guide number 105/32 (feet/meters) at ASA/ISO 100) electronic flashes. The FA can also utilize the Nikon MD-12 motor drive of the Nikon FM and Nikon FE series, but the unit will not provide power for the FA.

The Nikon FA was a mostly metal, heavily computerized version of the Nikon FE2. The FA was a battery-powered (two SR44 or LR44, or one 1/3N) electromechanically (much electronics, but many springs, gears and levers) controlled manual focus SLR with manual exposure control or aperture priority, shutter priority and programmed autoexposure. The FA was Nippon Kogaku's first SLR to have shutter priority autoexposure and first to have all four of the now standard PASM exposure modes. The FA actually had two programmed modes: a normal mode and a High Speed mode that automatically biased toward faster shutter speeds whenever an AI-S compatible lens (including Series E) of 135 mm or longer focal length was mounted.

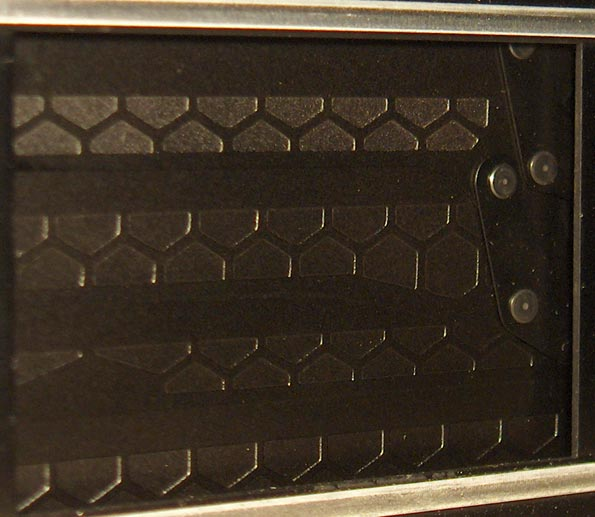
The FA's honeycomb titanium shutter

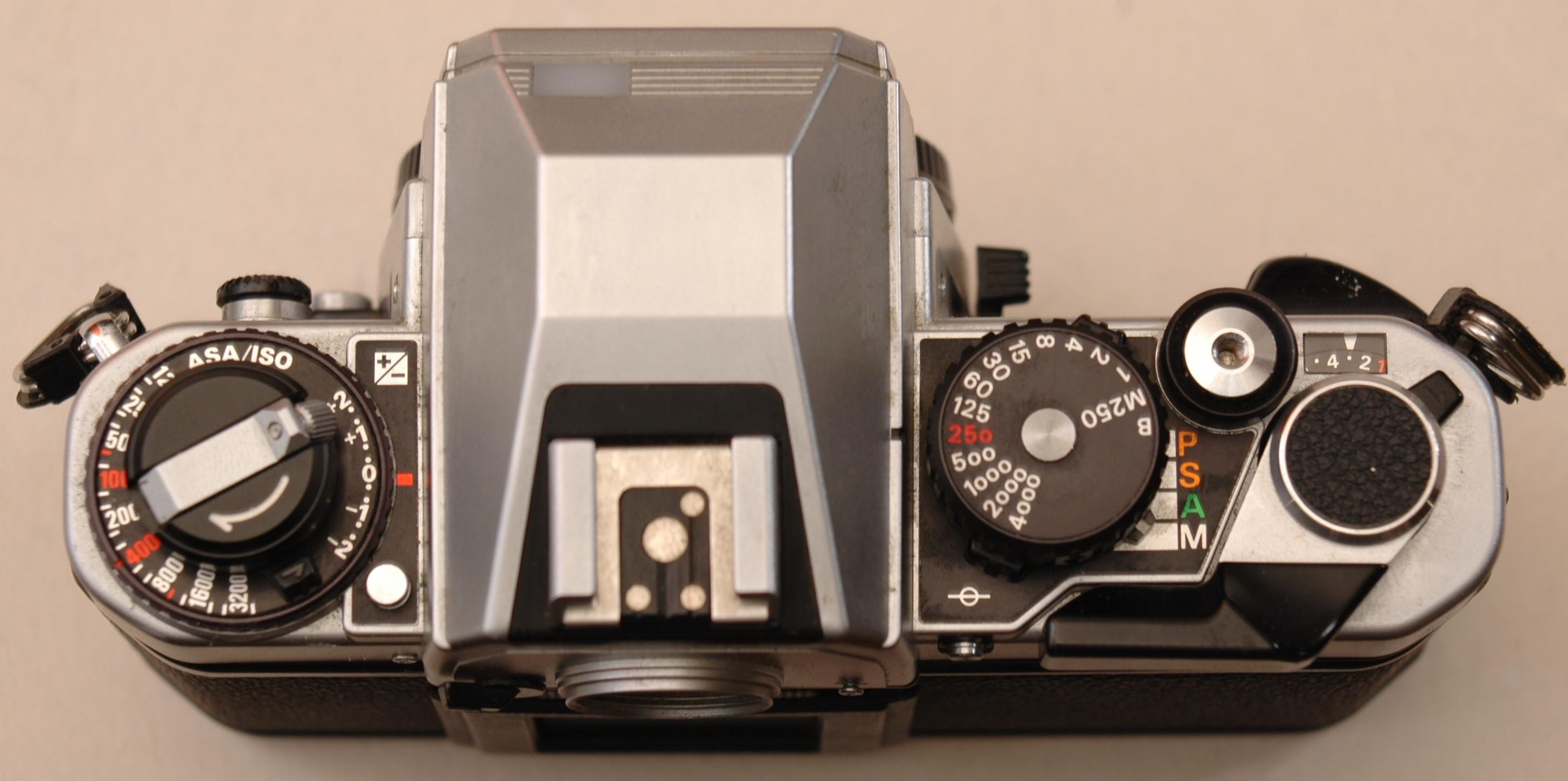
Controls

Unlike the other compact F-series SLRs, the FA used a plastic top plate: fiberglass reinforced polycarbonate for the black bodies, acrylonitrile-butadiene-styrene (ABS) for the chrome ones. The FA also used the ultra-fast, bearing-mounted, honeycomb-patterned, titanium-bladed shutter and through-the-lens (TTL) off-the-film (OTF) electronic flash automation of the FE2, but added a digital liquid crystal display (LCD) information panel at the top left of the viewfinder to indicate the readings of the built-in, open aperture, through-the-lens (TTL) light meter versus the actual camera settings. Depending on the set exposure mode, the LCD would display +/– over/underexposure markers, HI/LO out of metering range warnings, shutter speed and/or f-stop. Unfortunately, the LCD could not be illuminated in low ambient light situations. The FA also had a removable finger grip, similar to the one introduced on the Nikon FG, and an eyepiece blind. However, the FA's real claim to fame was the AMP meter.

AMP used a light meter with two segmented silicon photodiodes to divide the field of view into five segments: the center and the four outer quadrants. The readings of the various segments would be analyzed by a four-bit microchip computer (with a 524 kHz central processing unit (CPU) and 8 KB of memory) programmed to look for exposure errors caused by unusually bright or dark luminance patches and automatically correct the exposure settings. Nippon Kogaku said that the program was written after the visual assessment of nearly 100,000 photographs. AMP was originally intended to be introduced in the Nikon FE2, but it was not ready for production in time.

As the first generation of matrix metering, AMP was hardly foolproof. For instance, holding the FA vertically instead of horizontally might cause the meter to give different readings of the same scene. However, AMP was still demonstrably superior to the centerweighted type of light metering then in common use. AMP would give a good exposure 90-95% of the time versus 85-90% for centerweighting. Note that AMP was automatically disabled in the FA's manual exposure mode and could be turned off in the autoexposure modes. In both cases, the FA would default to Nippon Kogaku's traditional 60/40% centerweighted metering. However, the FA omitted the autoexposure memory lock of the FE2 - AMP was supposed to obviate any need for it.

AMP was the most important advance in exposure control since built-in, through-the-lens (TTL) light meters were introduced by the Topcon Super D (in the USA/Canada; RE Super in the rest of the world) in 1963. Despite outcries from traditionalist photographers who knew how to correct their own metering exposure errors, the feature was quickly copied by all the major SLR manufacturers.

The FA (like the rest of the compact F-series) was built to Nippon Kogaku's traditional and unusually high (and expensive) standard of workmanship for amateur-level SLRs. It used high-strength alloy parts, hardened metal gearing, ball bearing joints and gold-plated electrical switches; all made to precise tolerances and largely hand assembled, in an era when most other manufacturers switched to high-tech plastics, simplified modular construction and coarser tolerances to lower costs in the face of competitive pressure. As a result, the Nikon FA could endure conditions that would cause virtually all other contemporary non-professional-level SLRs to break down mechanically. A higher price was considered a fair trade for impressive durability.

== Design history ==
The 1970s and 1980s were an era of intense competition between the major SLR brands: Nikon, Canon, Minolta, Pentax and Olympus. Between circa 1975 to 1985, there was a dramatic shift away from heavy all-metal manual mechanical camera bodies to much more compact bodies with microprocessor electronic automation. In addition, because of rapid advances in electronics, the brands continually leapfrogged each other with models having new or more automatic features.

After many years of conservative designs, the Nikon FA was intended to be Nippon Kogaku's technological blockbuster, surpassing such worthies as the Canon A-1 (released 1978) and the Olympus OM-4 (1983) then pummeling Nikon sales. Nikon Inc. (USA)'s brochure referred to it as "THE TECHNOCAMERA". The FA did have one very rare and conservative feature for an electronically controlled camera. Nippon Kogaku's philosophy that a camera must always work when called upon resulted in the FA's backup ability to operate without batteries, albeit in a very limited fashion: completely manual mechanical control with two shutter speeds (1/250th second, marked M250, and Bulb, marked B) and without the light meter.

The FA was initially in high demand, despite its very high price – selling at barely 10% lower than the professional-level Nikon F3HP – because many Nikon owners were eagerly awaiting such a technology leader. Unfortunately, early production teething problems with all of the sophisticated electronics meant that Nippon Kogaku could not meet the demand. The FA picked up a reputation for unreliability (for a Nikon) and ultimately did not sell as well as hoped because, by the time production got rolling, its technology was eclipsed in the public's imagination by the advent of autofocusing SLRs, especially the landmark Minolta Maxxum 7000 in 1985. The FA also marked the end of the road for Nippon Kogaku's electromechanical cameras. All future Nikon camera development would emphasize the computerization of picture-taking.

Time has proven the Nikon FA to be very mechanically tough. Unfortunately, the complexity of all of its electronics made the FA less reliable than the other, simpler Nikon compact F-series SLR models, although still better than multimode SLRs from competing brands. During the mid-1990s, it was fairly popular on the user-collectible market and commanded prices ($500 in pristine condition) higher than when it was new, almost as high as the very popular, but much lower featured Nikon FE2, making the FA a relative bargain. However, since spare parts to repair any failed electronics became unavailable around the year 2000, the FA has become much less desirable to user-collectors, with a concomitant and commensurate drop in prices. Because of this, as with many other electronically controlled cameras, a working Nikon FA can be a bargain on the used market.

Class	1950s					1960s										1970s										1980s										1990s										2000s										2020s			
Class	55	56	57	58	59	60	61	62	63	64	65	66	67	68	69	70	71	72	73	74	75	76	77	78	79	80	81	82	83	84	85	86	87	88	89	90	91	92	93	94	95	96	97	98	99	00	01	02	03	04	05	06	07	08	09	...	20	21	22
Professional					F																					F3																																	
Professional																	F2												F3AF					F4								F5								F6									
High-end																													FA					F-801 (N8008)/ F-801s (N8008s)				F90 (N90)		F90X (N90s)					F100														
Mid-range																																F-501 (N2020)				F-601 (N6006)				F70 (N70)						F80 (N80)													
Mid-range																		EL / EL2 /ELW						FE					FE2							F-601M (N6000)				F70 (N70)						F80 (N80)													
Mid-range											FT		FTn/ FT2/ FT3										FM					FM2																			FM3A												
Mid-range											FS												FM					FM2																			FM3A												
Entry-level																																																											
Entry-level																																										Pronea S																	
Entry-level																																									Pronea 600i/6i																		
Entry-level								Nikkorex F / Nikkor J																	EM			FG			F-301 (N2000)				F-401s (N4004s)					F50 (N50)							F65 (N65 / U)		F75 (N75 / U2)										
Entry-level						35		35 II		Auto 35																				FG-20			F-401 (N4004)				F-401x (N5005)								F60 (N60)			F55 (N55)											
Entry-level									Zoom 35																																FM10 / FE10																		
Class	55	56	57	58	59	60	61	62	63	64	65	66	67	68	69	70	71	72	73	74	75	76	77	78	79	80	81	82	83	84	85	86	87	88	89	90	91	92	93	94	95	96	97	98	99	00	01	02	03	04	05	06	07	08	09	...	20	21	22
Class	1950s					1960s										1970s										1980s										1990s										2000s										2020s			
