= Fiber management system =

System that manages optical fiber connections

A fiber management system (FMS) manages optical fiber connections from outside of fiber rack to the fiber routers. Fiber-optic cable duct containing many fibers comes from far end sites and terminates on the FMS using splicing technology. FMS has fiber in and fiber out ports. From fiber out port the fiber patch will go to fiber optics based router.

FMS is a process by which a fiber network is managed. It tracks functions or attributes of the system such as schematic design, physical locations of assets, splice points (mechanical/fusion), and more.

== Background ==
Fiber management systems surfaced with fiber optic cable technology in the early 1970s. Peter Schultz, Donald Keck, and Robert Maurer developed the first optical fiber that could transmit digital data more than 65,000 times faster than coaxial cables. In April 1977, General Telephone and Electronics launched the first optical network, in Southern California. The next month, Bell launched an optical telephone system in Chicago. Since the 1970s, fiber networks have grown to service over 80% of the world’s data and voice traffic.

== Modern fiber management ==
Fiber optic network management is used to:

- Create and share cable capacity reports
- Determine total cable lengths
- Document fiber cable locations
- Document splicing records
- Estimate development costs
- Identify dark fiber cables
- Troubleshoot fiber breaks

Most organizations use software-based platforms, databases, and spreadsheets to execute these activities. With these tools, managers and installers can store data related to network components, connections, and tests that are valuable for planning future developments or troubleshooting issues as they arise. Fiber optic management systems can generate reports that describe various network data points, including cable section lengths, loss budgets, network capacity, optical loss, splice and termination locations.

Operators can also store geospatial data and documents if GIS capabilities are available. Software-based fiber optic network management platforms with GIS features allow network managers to visualize cable routes and evaluate surrounding environments.

== See also ==
- Broadband
- Fiber to the x
- GTE
- Last mile
- MapInfo
- Municipal broadband
