= Financial Management Standard =

The Financial Management Standard 1997 (also known as the FMS) was a state law of the Queensland Government empowered by the Financial Administration and Audit Act 1977 (Qld). Its primary purpose was to provide the policies and principles to be observed in financial management, including planning, performance management, internal control, and corporate management within Queensland Government.

This standard was repealed and replaced in 2009.
