= Nikon FM =

1977 35mm single-lens reflex camera

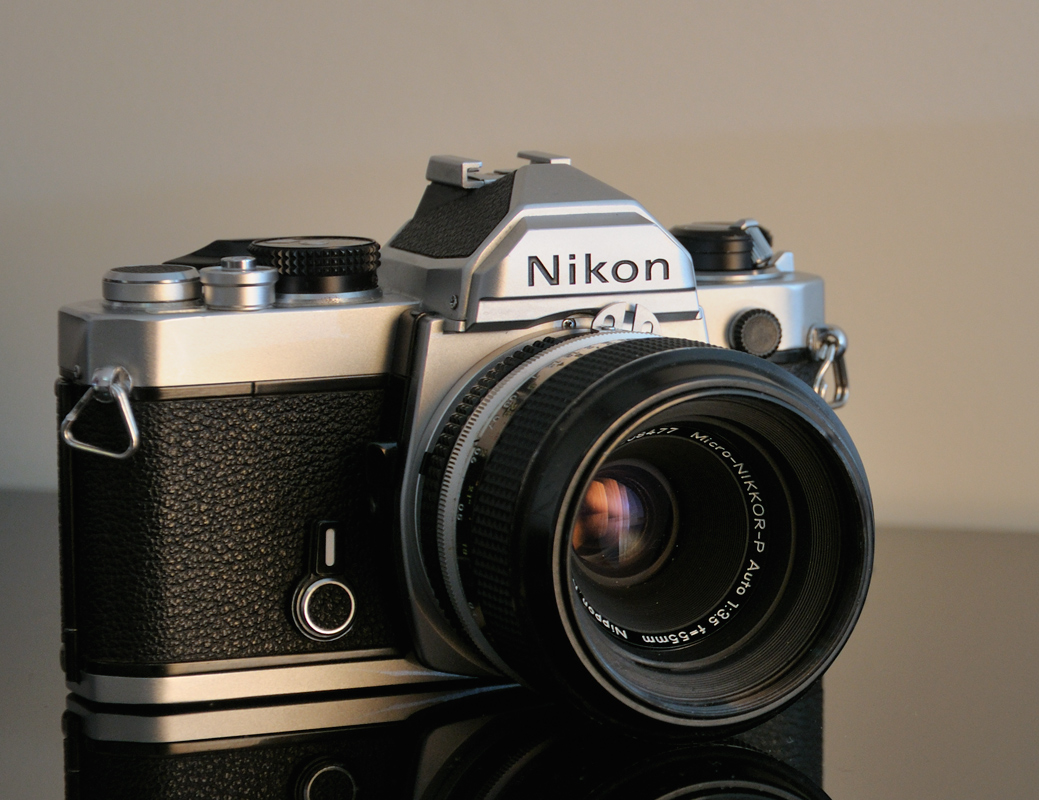

Overview
- Maker: Nikon (Nippon Kogaku K. K.)
- Type: Single-lens reflex
- Released: 1977
- Production: 1977-1982

Lens
- Lens mount: Nikon F-mount

Sensor/medium
- Film format: 35 mm
- Film size: 36 mm × 24 mm
- Film speed: ISO 12 – 4000

Focusing
- Focus: Manual

Exposure/metering
- Exposure modes: Manual
- Exposure metering: TTL with gallium arsenide phosphide photodiode
- Metering modes: 60/40 center-weighted

Flash
- Flash: ISO standard Hot shoe
- Flash synchronization: 1/125 s

Shutter
- Frame rate: Manually wound (3.5 frames/second with Motor Drive MD-11 or MD-12)
- Shutter speed range: 1 s – 1/1000 s; Bulb;

General
- Dimensions: 142×60.5×89.5 mm (5.59×2.38×3.52 in), 590 g
- Made in: Japan

Chronology
- Successor: Nikon FM2

The Nikon FM is a mechanically operated, interchangeable lens, 35 mm film, single-lens reflex (SLR) camera. It was made in Japan, between 1977 and 1982, by Nippon Kogaku K. K. (now Nikon Corporation).

== History ==
Released in 1977, the FM was the replacement for Nikkormat FT3, which had been introduced only a few months prior. It introduced an entirely new compact, but rugged, copper-aluminum alloy (duralumin) chassis that would become the basis for Nikon's highly successful range of compact semi-professional SLR cameras.

These cameras provided a lower-priced alternative to Nikon's professional F-series cameras, such as the Nikon F2. They were all-new successors to the Nikkormat F- and EL-series of amateur-level SLRs, but despite the lower price-point they continued Nikon's reputation for high-quality construction, impressive durability and measured technical innovation.

The FM's hardware, particularly, the chassis, and basic design philosophy (with some modifications) were into newer cameras, such as FE (introduced in 1978), FM2 (1982), FE2 (1983), FA (1983) and the limited-production FM3A of 2001.

== Design and construction ==
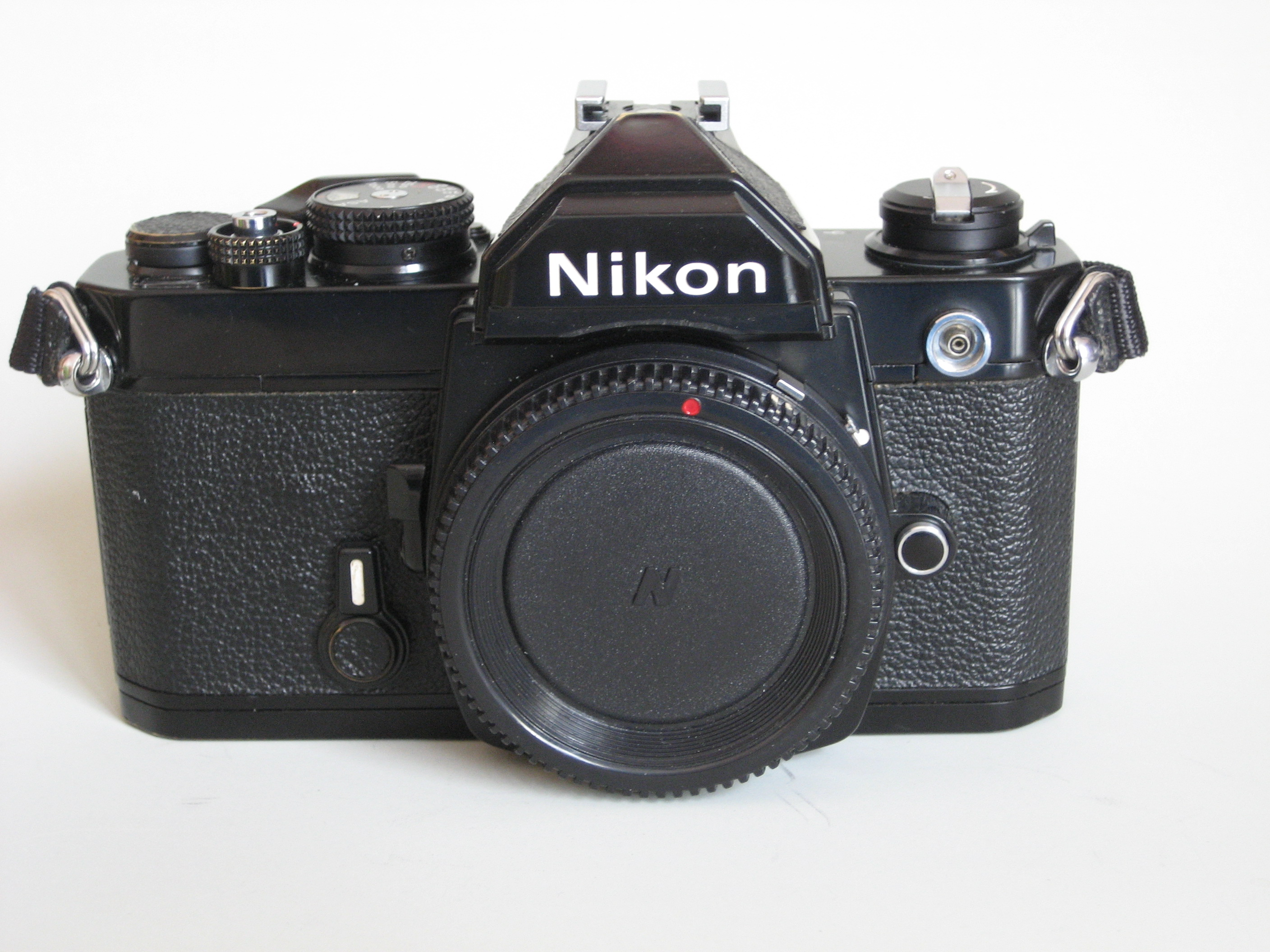
The Nikon FM in black.

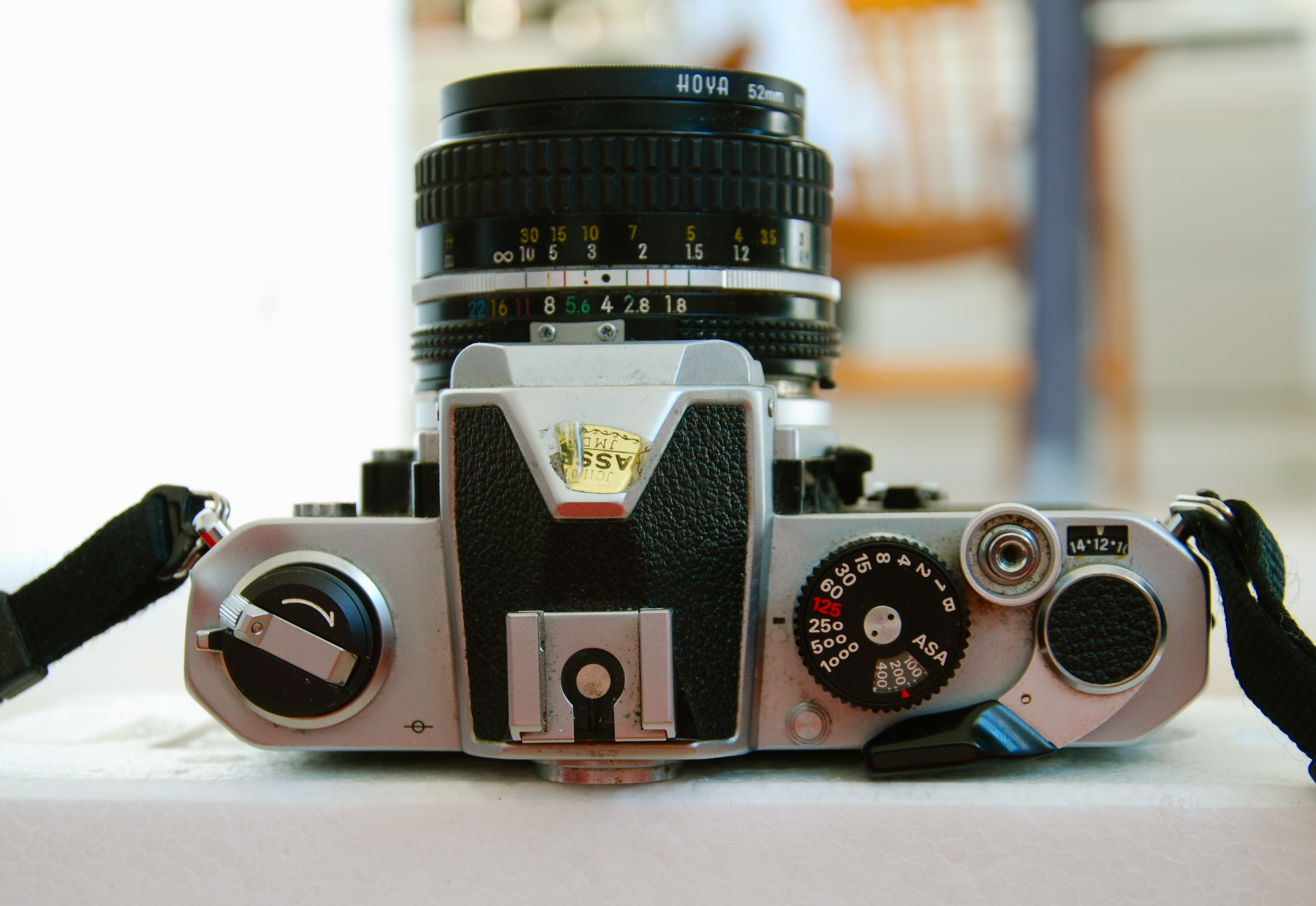
Top view

The FM is manufactured almost entirely from metal and uses a mechanical shutter. It is manual-focus-only, with manual exposure control. Being mechanical, the FM needs no batteries to operate (though two 1.5 volt 357 or 76A or LR44 or SR44 cells are required to operate the light meter). The metering system comprises a gallium photodiode (with 60/40% center-weighting) that meters through-the-lens at maximum aperture. Its reading is displayed by a "center-the-LED" system using vertically arranged light-emitting diodes (LEDs) next to +/O/- markers on the right side of the viewfinder that indicate overexposure, correct, or underexposure, respectively. The photographer adjusts the aperture or shutter-speed until the "O" LED illuminates to indicate correct exposure. This system can be traced back to the Nikkormat FT of 1965 and its "center-the-needle" system. The succeeding Nikon FM2 uses an improved center-the-LED system.

The FM uses a modern titanium-bladed, vertical-travel focal plane shutter capable of speeds from 1 second to 1/1000 of a second, plus bulb. Flash X-sync is at speeds up to 1/125th second.

The body has dimensions of 89.5 mm height, 142 mm width, 60.5 mm depth and 590 g weight. It is available in two finishes; silver with black trim and all black.

== Lens compatibility ==
The FM accepts all Nikon F bayonet mount lenses, with certain limitations or exceptions. Full compatibility requires lenses that support the Automatic Maximum-Aperture Indexing (AI) specification. This includes most Nikon lenses manufactured after 1977. Pre-AI lenses can be used, but only with stop-down metering.

Many newer Nikon and third-party F-mount lenses are also compatible. The only major exceptions are G-type Nikkor lenses, which have no aperture ring and thus no way of properly controlling exposure, and DX Nikkors, which do not resolve an image large enough to cover the 135 frame. All other AF Nikkor lenses will mount and be usable, but autofocus and Vibration Reduction (VR) will not be supported.

Both IX Nikkor lenses, for Nikon's Advanced Photo System (APS) SLRs, and very old "invasive" Fisheye-Nikkor lenses from the 1960s must not be mounted on the FM, as their rear elements will damage the FM's reflex mirror.

== Other features ==
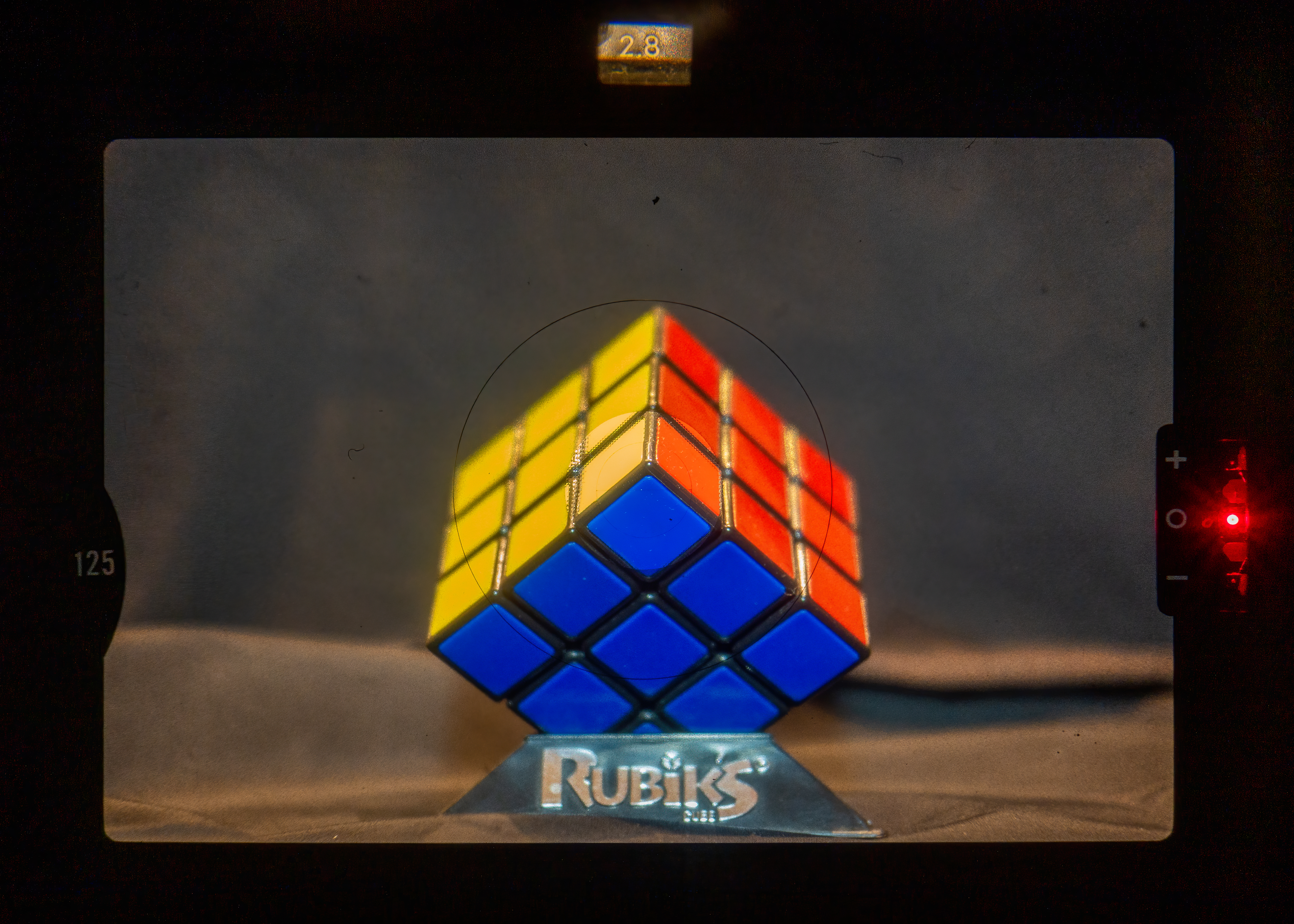
Viewfinder of a Nikon FM

The FM has a "full information" viewfinder. In addition to the metering LEDs; the viewfinder also displays the set shutter speed and lens aperture to give context to the LEDs. A fixed K-type focus screen with 3 mm split-image rangefinder and 1 mm microprism collar is fitted.

Major system accessories for the FM include the MD-11 and MD-12 motor drives; which enables continuous film advance at 3.5 frames per second, the Data Back MF-12; enabling the imprinting of date and time data on the film, and the Speedlight SB-8E electronic flash; guide number 82/25 (feet/meters) at ASA 100.

Note that there were two distinct versions of the FM, depending on how the FM's light meter (see below) was activated when a motor drive was mounted. The original FM had a rotary switch shutter button collar to lock the shutter, or switch to motor drive mode when the MD-11 was mounted. The MD-12 activated the meter automatically and the switch was omitted on late (1979 or after) FMs. Nippon Kogaku also strengthened the internal construction of late FMs.

== Design history ==
Due to advances in technology, the 1970s and 1980s saw increasing competition between the major SLR brands: Nikon, Canon, Minolta, Pentax and Olympus. The industry sought to meet increasing consumer demand for entry-level SLR cameras that were more capable than 35mm rangefinder (RF) cameras at the time, such as the Nikon S. From 1975 to 1985, there was a dramatic shift from heavy all-metal manual mechanical camera bodies to more compact bodies with microprocessor electronic automation.

Both Nikon's F2 and the Nikkormats were noted for their toughness and reliability. Nippon Kogaku wanted to instill these qualities into a new smaller and lighter design, and incorporate their high standard of workmanship into entry-level SLRs. For the FM, this meant the use of high-strength machined metal parts, hardened metal gears, a bearing-mounted film and shutter transport, and a camera assembled to precise tolerances. As a result, the Nikon FM is considered one of the most reliable 35mm SLR designs ever built.

The Nikon FM sold very well compared to the competing mechanical Pentax MX (released 1977) and Olympus OM-1N (1979) cameras. It was also a very popular backup camera among professional photographers using the Nikon F2 and F3. Because of its durability and access to the Nikkor lens line, the FM saw success in its market niche and brought the introduction of an improved successor, the Nikon FM2, in 1982.

== See also ==
- System camera
- Nikon F
- Nikon FM10
- Nikon Df

Class	1950s			1960s										1970s										1980s										1990s										2000s										2020s			
Class	57	58	59	60	61	62	63	64	65	66	67	68	69	70	71	72	73	74	75	76	77	78	79	80	81	82	83	84	85	86	87	88	89	90	91	92	93	94	95	96	97	98	99	00	01	02	03	04	05	06	07	08	09	...	20	21	22
Profes- sional			F																					F3																																	
Profes- sional															F2												F3AF					F4								F5								F6									
High- end																											FA					F-801 (N8008)/ F-801s (N8008s)				F90 (N90)		F90X (N90s)					F100														
Mid- range																														F-501 (N2020)				F-601 (N6006)				F70 (N70)						F80 (N80)													
Mid- range																EL / EL2 /ELW						FE					FE2							F-601M (N6000)				F70 (N70)						F80 (N80)													
Mid- range									FT		FTn/ FT2/ FT3										FM					FM2/FM2n																			FM3A												
Mid- range									FS												FM					FM2/FM2n																			FM3A												
Entry- level																																																									
Entry- level																																								Pronea 600i/6i																	
Entry- level																																										Pronea S															
Entry- level						Nikkorex F / Nikkor J																	EM			FG			F-301 (N2000)				F-401s (N4004s)					F50 (N50)							F65 (N65 / U)		F75 (N75 / U2)										
Entry- level				35		35 II		Auto 35																				FG-20			F-401 (N4004)				F-401x (N5005)								F60 (N60)			F55 (N55)											
Entry- level							Zoom 35																																FM10 / FE10																		
Class	57	58	59	60	61	62	63	64	65	66	67	68	69	70	71	72	73	74	75	76	77	78	79	80	81	82	83	84	85	86	87	88	89	90	91	92	93	94	95	96	97	98	99	00	01	02	03	04	05	06	07	08	09	...	20	21	22
Class	1950s			1960s										1970s										1980s										1990s										2000s										2020s			
