= Nikon FE =

1978 35mm single-lens reflex camera

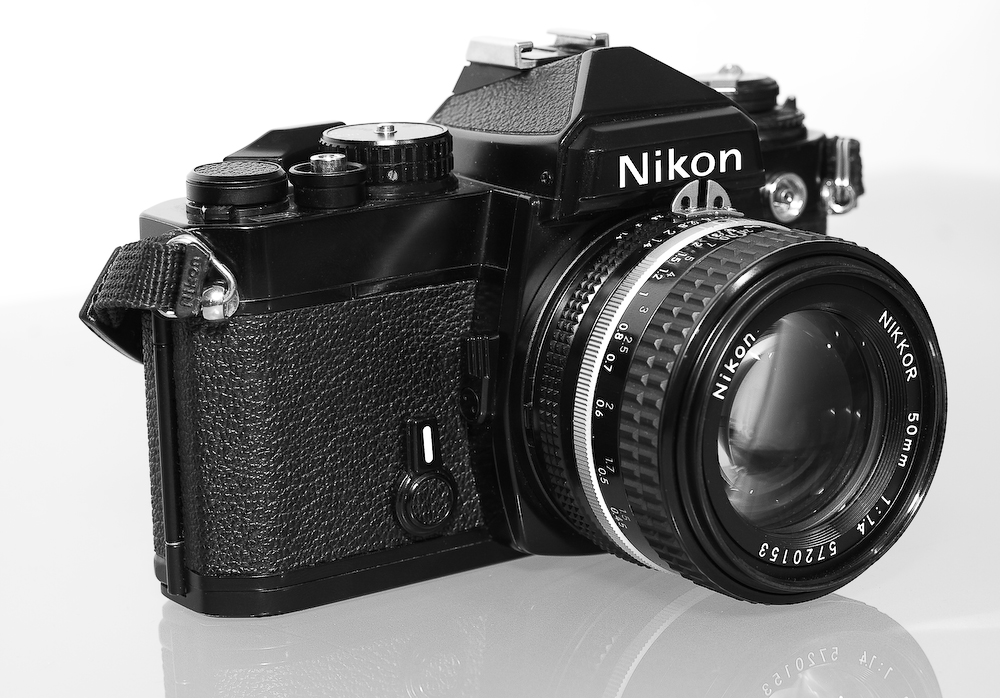
- Nikon FE with Nikkor 50mm f/1.4 lens

Overview
- Maker: Nippon Kogaku K. K.
- Type: single-lens reflex
- Released: 1978
- Production: 1978-1983

Lens
- Lens mount: Nikon F lens mount

Sensor/medium
- Film format: 35 mm
- Film size: 36 mm × 24 mm
- Film speed: ISO 12 – 4000
- Film advance: manual

Focusing
- Focus: Manual

Exposure/metering
- Exposure modes: Aperture priority, manual
- Exposure metering: TTL with silicon photodiode
- Metering modes: Centerweighted

Flash
- Flash: ISO standard Hot shoe
- Flash synchronization: 1/125 s

Shutter
- Shutter speed range: 8 s – 1/1000 s; Bulb; 1/90 s mechanical backup

General
- Optional data backs: MF-12
- Optional motor drives: MD-11, MD-12
- Dimensions: 142×57.5×89.5 mm (5.59×2.26×3.52 in)
- Weight: 590 g (21 oz)
- Made in: Japan

The Nikon FE is an advanced semi-professional level, interchangeable lens, 35 mm film, single-lens reflex (SLR) camera. It was manufactured by Nikon in Japan from 1978 to 1983, and was available new from dealer stock until c. 1984. The FE uses a metal-bladed, vertical-travel focal plane shutter with a speed range of 8 to 1/1000 second, plus Bulb, and flash X-sync of 1/125th second. It had dimensions of 89.5 millimetres (3.52 in) height, 142 mm (5.6 in) width, 57.5 mm (2.26 in) depth and 590 grams (21 oz) weight. It was available in two colors: black with chrome trim and all black. As on the FM, its model designation did not appear on the front of the camera, but was engraved as a small "FE" preceding the serial number on the rear of the housing.

== History ==
The FE was the replacement for Nikon EL2 of 1977 and is a member of the classic Nikon compact F-series. It uses a rugged aluminum-copper alloy (duralumin) chassis developed from the one introduced in the Nikon FM in 1977, with minor external controls and cosmetic differences. The Nikon compact F-series SLRs were moderately priced, semi-professional level stablemates to the company's premium-priced, professional level Nikon F2 (1971) and F3 (1980) SLRs. They were all-new successors to the Nikkormat F and EL-series of amateur level SLRs. With their quality construction, impressive durability and evolutionary technical innovation, the F-series were very popular with professional photographers, who prized their durability and ability to operate in extreme environments.

The FM/FE chassis proved to be remarkably long-lived. Nikon used it, with incremental improvements, as the backbone of the compact F-series from 1977 to 2006. The other members of the compact F-series are the Nikon FM2 (introduced in 1982), FE2 (1983), FA (1983) and the limited production Nikon FM3A (2001). The FE was discontinued with the introduction of the visually similar FE2, which had faster top and sync shutter speeds, as well as TTL (through-the-lens) flash metering, but which was no longer compatible with non-AI lenses.

== Features ==
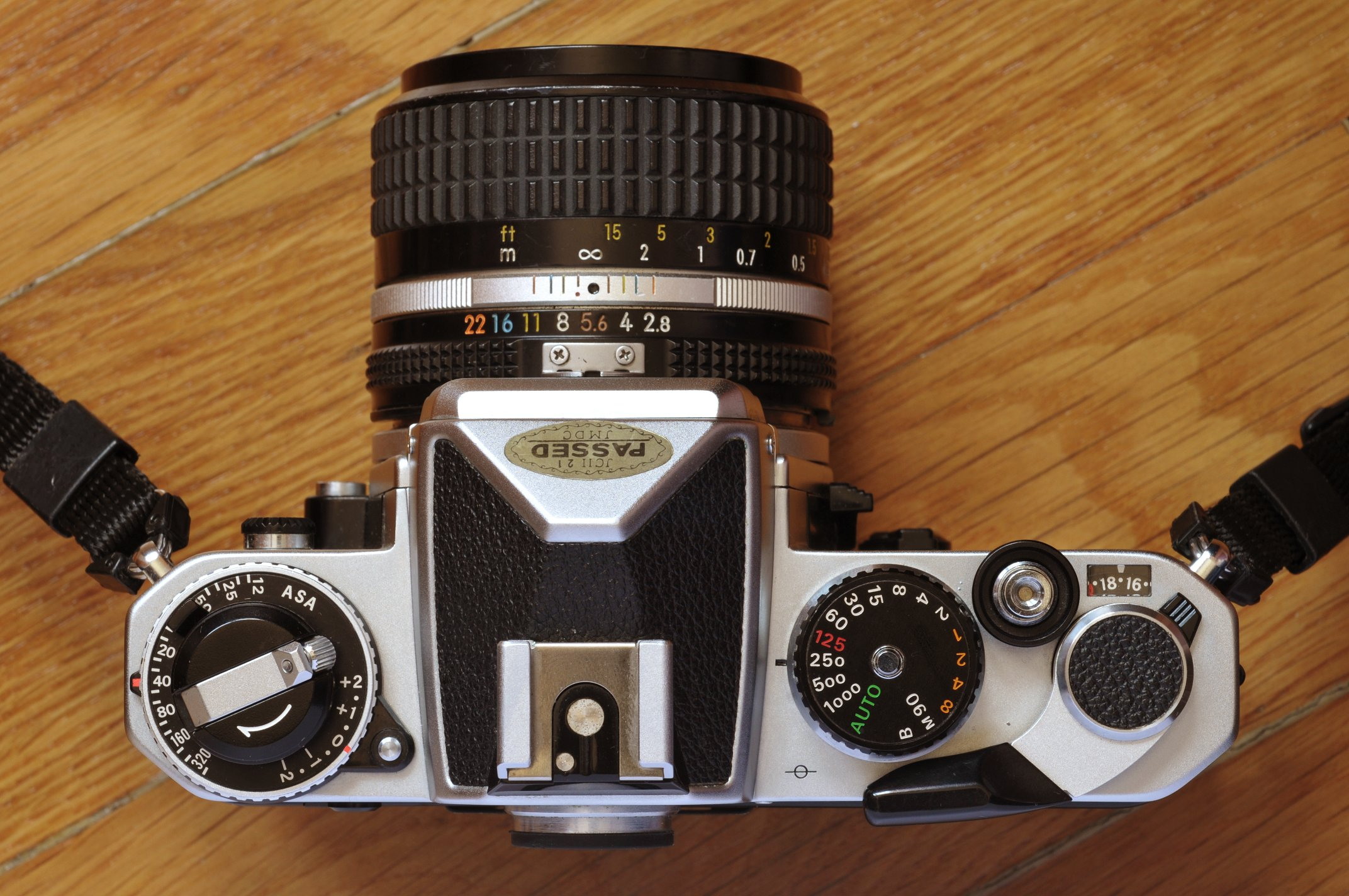
Nikon FE top plate showing the film-speed and exposure compensation dials on the left, and shutter speed dial on the right.

The FE is a manual-focus SLR with manual exposure control or aperture-priority autoexposure, and electromechanical components. As such, the FE requires batteries (two S76 or A76, or LR44 or SR44, or one 1/3N) to power its electronically controlled shutter. The batteries also power the FE's "match-needle" exposure control system. This consists of two needles pointing along a vertical shutter speed scale on the left side of the viewfinder. In manual mode, a black needle points out the shutter speed recommended by the built-in, open aperture, through-the-lens (TTL), silicon photodiode (SPD) light meter, with 60/40 percent centerweighting, while a translucent green needle shows the actual camera-set shutter speed. The photographer adjusts the shutter speed and/or the lens aperture f-stop until the needles align.

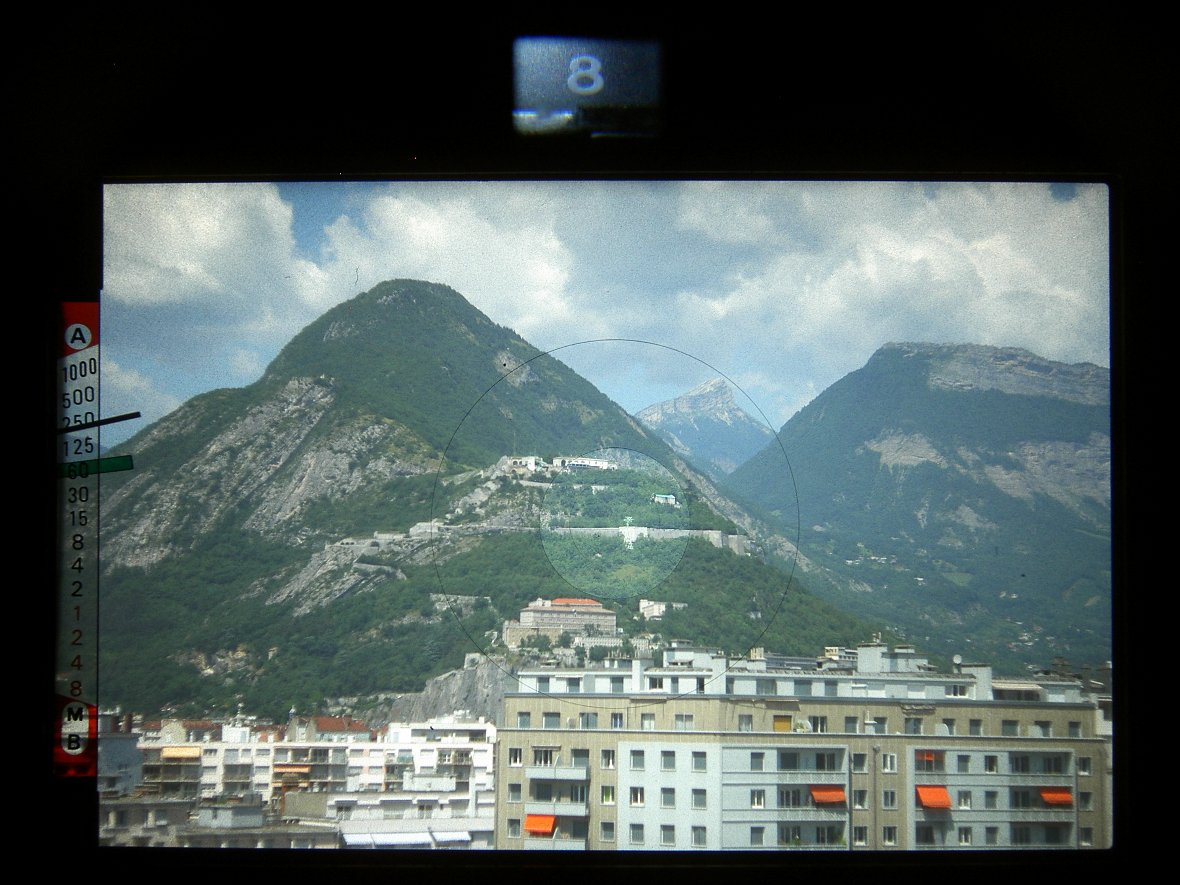
Viewfinder of the Nikon FE showing the ADR (Aperture Direct Readout) on top and the match needle exposure indicator on the left.

In automatic mode, the FE's black needle indicates the shutter speed automatically set by the electronic circuitry in response to the light reaching the meter. The green needle is used to indicate that the FE is in "A" mode. This system can be traced back to the Nikkormat EL (in the USA/Canada; Nikomat EL, rest of the world) of 1972 and continued until 2006 with the discontinuation of the Nikon FM3A.

The FE's auto-exposure lock mechanism is activated by pushing and holding the timer shutter release lever toward the lens mount; even though the exposure is fixed to the state of the instant the lever is pushed, the black shutter speed needle in the viewfinder does not reflect this and moves freely.

The FE has a "full information" viewfinder very similar to the Nikkormat EL. In addition to the metering shutter scale, the viewfinder also displays the set lens aperture through an optical "eye" (this particular feature missing on the Nikkormat EL) and has a flash "ready" LED to give context to the metering needles. The viewfinder also introduced interchangeable focusing screens to the compact F-series: the standard Nikon Type K screen (3 mm split image rangefinder and 1 mm microprism collar focusing aids plus 12 mm etched circle indicating the area of the meter centerweighting) could be replaced by Type B (central 3 mm focusing spot plus 12 mm etched circle) and Type E (Type B plus a grid of five horizontal and three vertical lines; called the "architectural screen") screens.

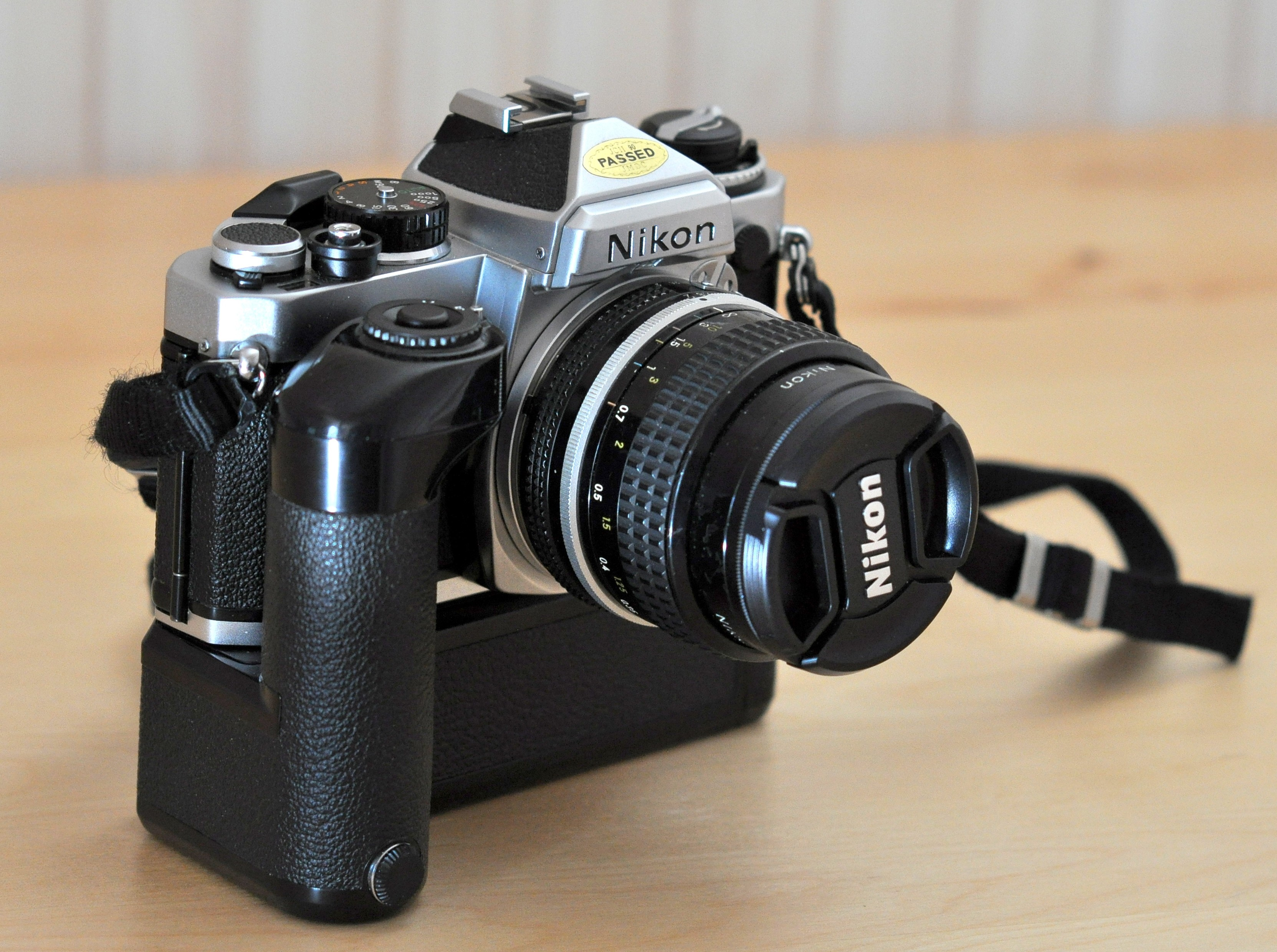
Nikon FE with motor drive MD-12 and Nikkor AI 24 mm/f2

Major accessories for the FE include the Nikon MD-11, motor drive (automatic film advance up to 3.5 frames per second) superseded by the MD-12 which had an automatic shutoff that the MD-11 lacked, the Nikon MF-12 databack (time or date stamping on the film), and the Nikon Speedlight SB-10 electronic flash (guide number 82/25 (feet/meters) at ASA 100). The MF-12's date function ranges until the year 2100.

== Lens compatibility ==
The FE accepts all lenses with the Nikon F bayonet mount (introduced in 1959), with certain limitations or exceptions. Full lens compatibility requires support for the Aperture Indexing (AI) feature (introduced 1977), and thus the majority of Nikon lenses manufactured in recent decades will work. During the late 1970s, Nippon Kogaku manufactured approximately 55 Nikkor non-AI and Nikkor AI type lenses. They ranged from a Fisheye-Nikkor 6 mm f/2.8 220˚ circular fisheye to a Reflex-Nikkor 2000 mm f/11 super-long mirror telephoto. This was the largest and widest ranging lens selection in the world at the time.

The contemporary AI lenses for the FE were the Nikkor AI-S, Nikkor AI and Nikon Series E types. The newer AF-S Nikkor, AF-I Nikkor, AF Nikkor D and AF Nikkor autofocus lenses are also AI types. They will work, but with manual focus only. Most pre-AI lenses will also work on the camera, but the meter coupling lever used for aperture indexing on AI-lenses must be unlocked and raised (out of the way) before attaching the lens, and the exposure must be done when pressing down the depth of field lever. This feature was removed on FE2 (and FM2), and pre-AI lenses had to be converted before they could be used (by changing or modifying the aperture ring).

Nikon's most recent 35 mm film/full-frame FX digital SLR lenses, the AF Nikkor G type (introduced in 2000) lack an aperture control ring, without which there is no conventional way to set aperture. However, the depth-of-field preview lever can be used to control the aperture using a stop-down metering method and has to be hold down at the same aperture value until the picture is taken. Doing so, it is not possible to know the real value of the aperture, although a correct exposure may be taken in AUTO mode of the camera. AF Nikkor DX type (2003) lenses lack an aperture ring as well, and have a smaller image circles sized for the smaller sensors on Nikon's DX digital SLRs, thus projecting a black vignette circle onto the FE film plane. Nikon's Vibration Reduction (VR) image stabilization system, available on some newer lenses since 2000, does not function on the FE.

Both IX Nikkor lenses (1996), for Nikon's Advanced Photo System (APS) film SLRs and very old "invasive" Nikkor 35 mm fisheye lenses from the 1960s must not be mounted on the FE, as their rear elements will intrude far enough into the mirror box to cause damage.

== Design history ==
Beginning in 1977 with the advanced amateur Nikon FM, there was a complete overhaul of Nippon Kogaku's entire Nikon SLR line. The 1970s and 1980s were an era of intense competition between the major SLR brands: Nikon, Canon, Minolta, Pentax and Olympus. Between c. 1975 to 1985, there was a dramatic shift away from heavy all-metal manual mechanical camera bodies to much more compact bodies with microprocessor electronic automation. In addition, because of rapid advances in electronics, the brands continually leap-frogged each other with models having new or more automatic features. The industry was trying to expand out from the saturated high-end professional and advanced amateur market and appeal to the large mass of low-end amateur photographers itching to move up from compact automatic leaf shutter rangefinder (RF) cameras to the more versatile and glamorous SLR but were intimidated by the need to learn all the gritty details of operating a traditional SLR.

Although Nippon Kogaku enjoyed a sterling reputation among professional photographers with their Nikon F2 of 1971, the F2 was far too massive, expensive and complicated for most amateurs and beginners.

Nippon Kogaku chose an unusually high standard of workmanship for amateur level SLRs. It kept using high-strength alloy parts, hardened metal gearing, ball bearing joints and gold-plated electrical switches, all made to precise tolerances and largely hand assembled, in the Nikon compact F-series. As a result, the Nikon FE could endure conditions that would cause nearly all other contemporary non-professional level SLRs to break down. A higher price was considered a fair trade for impressive durability.

The Nikon FE was a conservative design compared to its competitors. It can be described as a twin of the Nikon FM mechanical (springs, gears, levers) camera with precision electronic controls grafted on. Its unusual roots were most obvious in its backup ability to operate without batteries – albeit in a very limited fashion: completely manual mechanical control with two shutter speeds (1/90 second, marked M90, or Bulb) and without the light meter.

The FE's deliberately limited but tightly focused features were not intended to appeal to snapshooters with no intention of learning about shutter speeds and f-stops. Nippon Kogaku believed that advanced amateur photographers were not interested in every possible automated bell and whistle, but rather the highest possible quality and precision of control.

The Nikon FE was a good seller, but not as popular as more cheaply built and less expensive competing auto-exposure SLRs, such as the Canon AE-1 (released 1976) or the Minolta XD11 (in the USA and Canada; XD7 in Europe; XD in Japan; 1976). Its design and functions were more similar to contemporary enthusiast SLRs such as the Leica R3. Time has proven that Nippon Kogaku's choice of simplicity over gadgetry made the FE tough and reliable, and it is now regarded as one of the finest SLRs of its generation.

Class	1950s			1960s										1970s										1980s										1990s										2000s										2020s			
Class	57	58	59	60	61	62	63	64	65	66	67	68	69	70	71	72	73	74	75	76	77	78	79	80	81	82	83	84	85	86	87	88	89	90	91	92	93	94	95	96	97	98	99	00	01	02	03	04	05	06	07	08	09	...	20	21	22
Profes- sional			F																					F3																																	
Profes- sional															F2												F3AF					F4								F5								F6									
High- end																											FA					F-801 (N8008)/ F-801s (N8008s)				F90 (N90)		F90X (N90s)					F100														
Mid- range																														F-501 (N2020)				F-601 (N6006)				F70 (N70)						F80 (N80)													
Mid- range																EL / EL2 /ELW						FE					FE2							F-601M (N6000)				F70 (N70)						F80 (N80)													
Mid- range									FT		FTn/ FT2/ FT3										FM					FM2/FM2n																			FM3A												
Mid- range									FS												FM					FM2/FM2n																			FM3A												
Entry- level																																																									
Entry- level																																								Pronea 600i/6i																	
Entry- level																																										Pronea S															
Entry- level						Nikkorex F / Nikkor J																	EM			FG			F-301 (N2000)				F-401s (N4004s)					F50 (N50)							F65 (N65 / U)		F75 (N75 / U2)										
Entry- level				35		35 II		Auto 35																				FG-20			F-401 (N4004)				F-401x (N5005)								F60 (N60)			F55 (N55)											
Entry- level							Zoom 35																																FM10 / FE10																		
Class	57	58	59	60	61	62	63	64	65	66	67	68	69	70	71	72	73	74	75	76	77	78	79	80	81	82	83	84	85	86	87	88	89	90	91	92	93	94	95	96	97	98	99	00	01	02	03	04	05	06	07	08	09	...	20	21	22
Class	1950s			1960s										1970s										1980s										1990s										2000s										2020s			
