= Nikon FM2 =

1982 35mm single-lens reflex camera

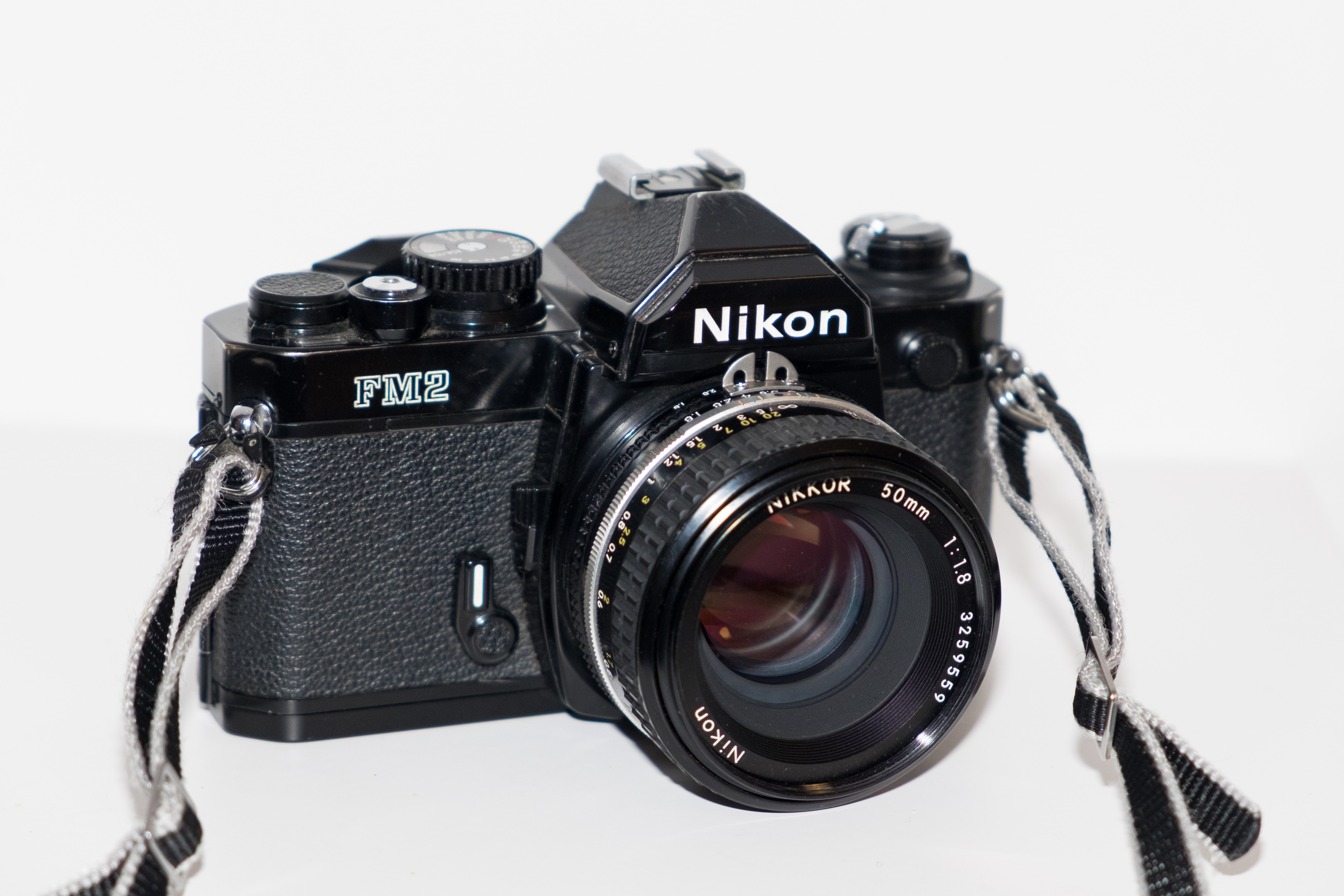

Overview
- Maker: Nikon (Nippon Kogaku K. K.)
- Type: 35mm SLR
- Released: 1982 FM2; 1984 FM2n
- Production: 1982-2001; 19 years
- Intro price: $364

Lens
- Lens mount: Nikon F-mount

Focusing
- Focus: Manual focus

Exposure/metering
- Exposure: manual 60/40 center-weighted

Flash
- Flash: ISO-standard hot shoe

Shutter
- Frame rate: manually wound

General
- Battery: 2x1.5V LR44
- Dimensions: 142.5×90×60 mm (5.61×3.54×2.36 in)
- Weight: 520 g (18 oz)
- Made in: Japan

Chronology
- Predecessor: Nikon FM
- Successor: Nikon FM3A

The Nikon FM2 is an advanced semi-professional, interchangeable lens, 35 mm film, single-lens reflex (SLR) camera. It was manufactured by Nippon Kogaku K. K. (today Nikon Corporation) in Japan from 1982 to 2001. The original FM2 camera was released in 1982. A slightly updated version with some incremental improvements (such as a higher flash-sync speed) was released in 1984. This later version is commonly referred to as the FM2n (for 'new', due to the N preceding the serial number on the rear of the top plate), although both versions are labelled as the FM2 on the front of the camera body.

The FM2 originally used an advanced Nikon-design, metal-bladed, bearing-mounted, vertical-travel purely mechanical focal plane shutter with a (then unheard-of) speed range of 1 to 1/4000th second plus Bulb, plus a fast flash X-sync of 1/200th second, later increased to 1/250 s with the FM2n. It had dimensions of 90 mm (height), 142 mm (width), 60 mm (depth) and a weight of 540 g. It was available in two colors: black with chrome trim and all black. The introductory US list price for the chrome body only (no lens) was $364. By 1988, it listed for $525; in 1995, it plateaued at $745 and remained there until discontinued. Note that SLRs are usually sold for 30 to 40 percent below list price.

The FM2 is a member of the classic Nikon compact F'x'-series SLRs and was built using the same material—copper-aluminium-silicon (copper-silumin) alloy—as the earlier Nikon FM (introduced in 1977) and FE (1978) cameras. The Nikon FE2 and FA of 1983 also had this silumin alloy construction, along with the limited production Nikon FM3A of 2001, although the design of the housing differs from model to model.

== Features ==
Like its predecessor, the FM, the FM2 has a long-standing reputation for reliability and durability. It has an extremely strong body of copper-aluminum-silicon (silumin) alloy. The FM2's film transport consists of high-strength hardened metal gears and moving parts, mounted on clusters of ball bearings. The camera's precision-tapered, high-strength vertical metal shutter blades were fabricated originally of lightweight titanium (later production FM2 shutter blades were made of aluminum, the same as those found in the Nikon N8008), while the mirror/shutter mechanism rides on self-lubricating bearings. The mirror linkage uses the same mechanism found on Nikon's professional F2, with some modern improvements, such as additional foam dampeners, designed to further reduce effects of vibration and mirror bounce. The FM2 also features Nikon's close tolerance assembly and minimal space lubrication, meaning that it will reliably operate in temperature extremes of −40 °C to +50 °C.

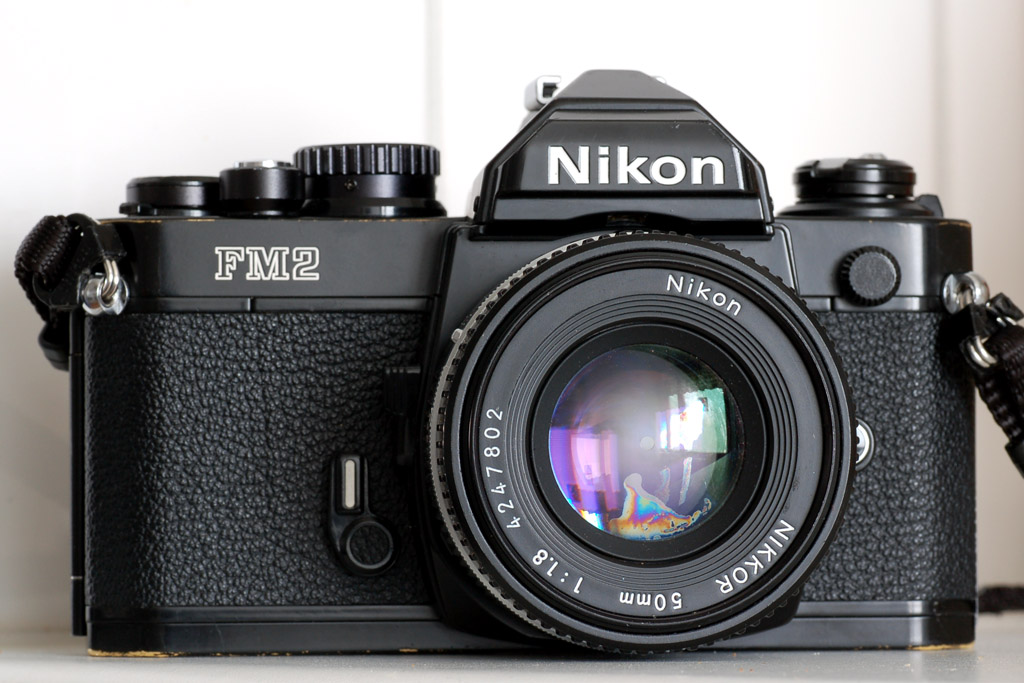
The Nikon FM2 in black.

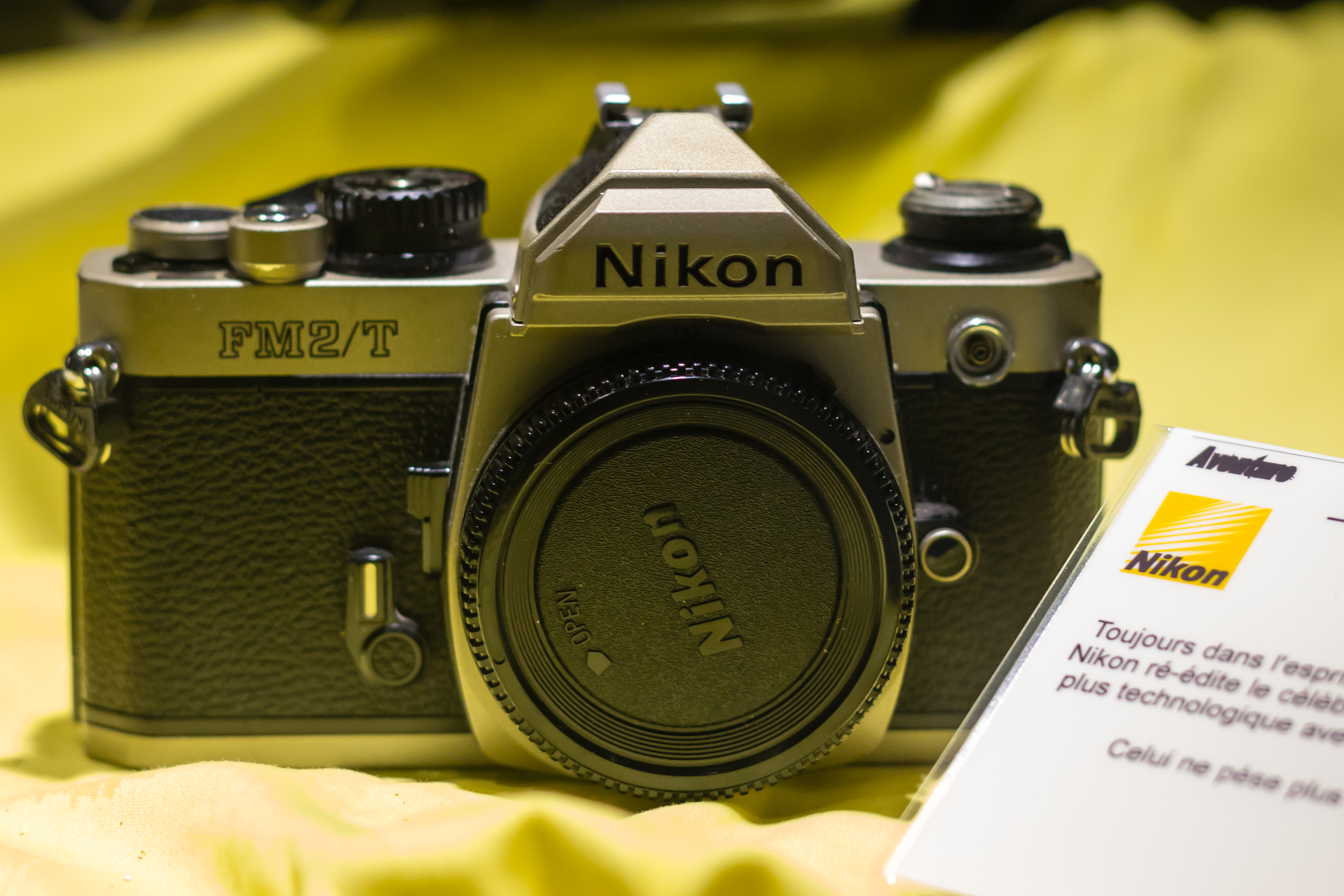
The FM2/T titanium version.

The FM2 accepts all Nikon F bayonet mount lenses that support the Automatic Indexing (AI) feature introduced in 1977. The Nikon-made AI lenses of this type are the AF-S Nikkor, AF-I Nikkor, AF Nikkor D, AF Nikkor, Nikkor AI-S, Nikkor AI and Nikon Series E types. Nikon's most recent 35 mm film SLR lenses, the AF Nikkor G type (introduced in 2000) and the AF Nikkor DX type (2003) will mount but will not function properly. IX Nikkor lenses (1996), for Nikon's Advanced Photo System (APS) film SLRs, must not be mounted, as their rear elements will intrude far enough into the mirror box to cause damage.

During the early 1980s, Nippon Kogaku manufactured approximately 70 different types of manual focus Nikkor AI-S and Nikon Series E branded lenses. They ranged from a Fisheye-Nikkor 6 mm f/2.8 220° circular fisheye to a Reflex-Nikkor 2000 mm f/11 super telephoto. The AF-S Nikkor, AF-I Nikkor, AF Nikkor D and AF Nikkor autofocus lenses will work for manual focus only.

Accessories for the FM2 included the Nikon MD-12 motor drive (automatic film advance up to 3.2 frames per second), the Nikon MF-16 databack (sequential numbering, time or date stamping on the film), and the Nikon SB-15 (guide number 82/25 (feet/meters) at ASA/ISO 100) and Nikon SB-16B (guide number 105/32 (feet/meters) at ASA/ISO 100) electronic flashes.

The FM2 is a mechanically controlled manual focus SLR with manual exposure control. It is operable without batteries, and only needs the two S76 or A76 batteries, or one 1/3N battery to power the light meter, which consisted of an internal 60/40 percent centerweighted system linked to a center-the-LED exposure control system. The exposure control system used vertically arranged +/o/– light emitting diodes (LEDs) on the right side of the viewfinder to indicate the readings of the meter versus actual camera settings. This metering system can be traced back to the Nikkormat FT (aka Nikomat FT) of 1965 and its center-the-needle system. The viewfinder also had Nikon's standard interchangeable focus screen with various focusing options.

The major improvements in the FM2 compared to the FM were limited automatic dedicated electronic flash control and a mechanically timed vertical metal shutter (bearing mounted for reduced friction and extended life) reaching a top speed of an unprecedented 1/4000th second, with an X-sync of 1/250th second. This shutter was able to reach such ultra-fast speeds because its shutter blades had a travel time of 3.3 milliseconds, half of typical vertical travel metal-bladed focal plane shutters of the time.(citation)

The improved titanium-bladed shutter from the Nikon FE2 was adapted to the FM2 in 1984 and X-sync increased to 1/250th second. The new camera was renamed the Nikon FM2n (New FM2 in the Japanese market), but remained marked FM2. The only external differences were the red 250 setting on the shutter speed dial and the N serial number prefix. Advances in metallurgy proved the suitability of high-strength aluminum as a substitute for the expensive titanium used in the shutter, and was adopted for the FM2n in 1989. The only way to identify the different versions is to inspect the shutter—the early FM2n had honeycombed shutter blades and the late FM2n had smooth blades.

In 1993, a special ultra-durable version of the FM2n called the FM2/T was released and sold in parallel with the regular FM2n. The "T" stood for titanium, which was the material used for the top and bottom plates along with the camera back. The Nikon FM2/T listed for $1120 and was discontinued in 1997.

== Design history ==
The 1970s and 1980s were an era of intense competition between the major SLR brands: Nikon, Canon, Minolta, Pentax and Olympus. Between circa 1975 to 1985, there was a dramatic shift away from heavy all-metal manual mechanical camera bodies to much more compact bodies with integrated circuit (IC) electronic automation. In addition, because of rapid advances in electronics, the brands continually leapfrogged each other with models that had new or more automatic features. SLR camera manufacturers were attempting to expand from the high-end professional and semi-professional market to the growing consumer market. The latter desired an affordable, yet full-featured 35 mm camera, but were intimidated by the need to learn the intricacies of operating a traditional SLR.

Against this backdrop, the FM2 may have seemed an anachronism, yet it sold well. It was a reliable, durable mechanical camera in a time of ever-increasing electronic automation, and often, less durable construction. The FM2 was not designed for budget-minded snapshooters who would never bother to learn to use shutter-speeds and aperture settings, but rather was intended to appeal to serious photographers who demanded a tough, rugged camera. Nippon Kogaku believed that advanced photographers were not interested in every possible automated bell and whistle, but rather in high quality and precision workmanship.

The FM2 remained in limited production until 2001, long after many other more complex electronic designs from the 1980s had not only left the market but become inoperable. Many professional photographers continue to use the FM2 as a backup camera, both because of its ruggedness and because it is capable of full mechanical operation with all features except the light meter, even without a battery.

== Notes ==
Class	1950s			1960s										1970s										1980s										1990s										2000s										2020s			
Class	57	58	59	60	61	62	63	64	65	66	67	68	69	70	71	72	73	74	75	76	77	78	79	80	81	82	83	84	85	86	87	88	89	90	91	92	93	94	95	96	97	98	99	00	01	02	03	04	05	06	07	08	09	...	20	21	22
Profes- sional			F																					F3																																	
Profes- sional															F2												F3AF					F4								F5								F6									
High- end																											FA					F-801 (N8008)/ F-801s (N8008s)				F90 (N90)		F90X (N90s)					F100														
Mid- range																														F-501 (N2020)				F-601 (N6006)				F70 (N70)						F80 (N80)													
Mid- range																EL / EL2 /ELW						FE					FE2							F-601M (N6000)				F70 (N70)						F80 (N80)													
Mid- range									FT		FTn/ FT2/ FT3										FM					FM2/FM2n																			FM3A												
Mid- range									FS												FM					FM2/FM2n																			FM3A												
Entry- level																																																									
Entry- level																																								Pronea 600i/6i																	
Entry- level																																										Pronea S															
Entry- level						Nikkorex F / Nikkor J																	EM			FG			F-301 (N2000)				F-401s (N4004s)					F50 (N50)							F65 (N65 / U)		F75 (N75 / U2)										
Entry- level				35		35 II		Auto 35																				FG-20			F-401 (N4004)				F-401x (N5005)								F60 (N60)			F55 (N55)											
Entry- level							Zoom 35																																FM10 / FE10																		
Class	57	58	59	60	61	62	63	64	65	66	67	68	69	70	71	72	73	74	75	76	77	78	79	80	81	82	83	84	85	86	87	88	89	90	91	92	93	94	95	96	97	98	99	00	01	02	03	04	05	06	07	08	09	...	20	21	22
Class	1950s			1960s										1970s										1980s										1990s										2000s										2020s			
