= Nikon FE2 =

1983 35mm single-lens reflex camera

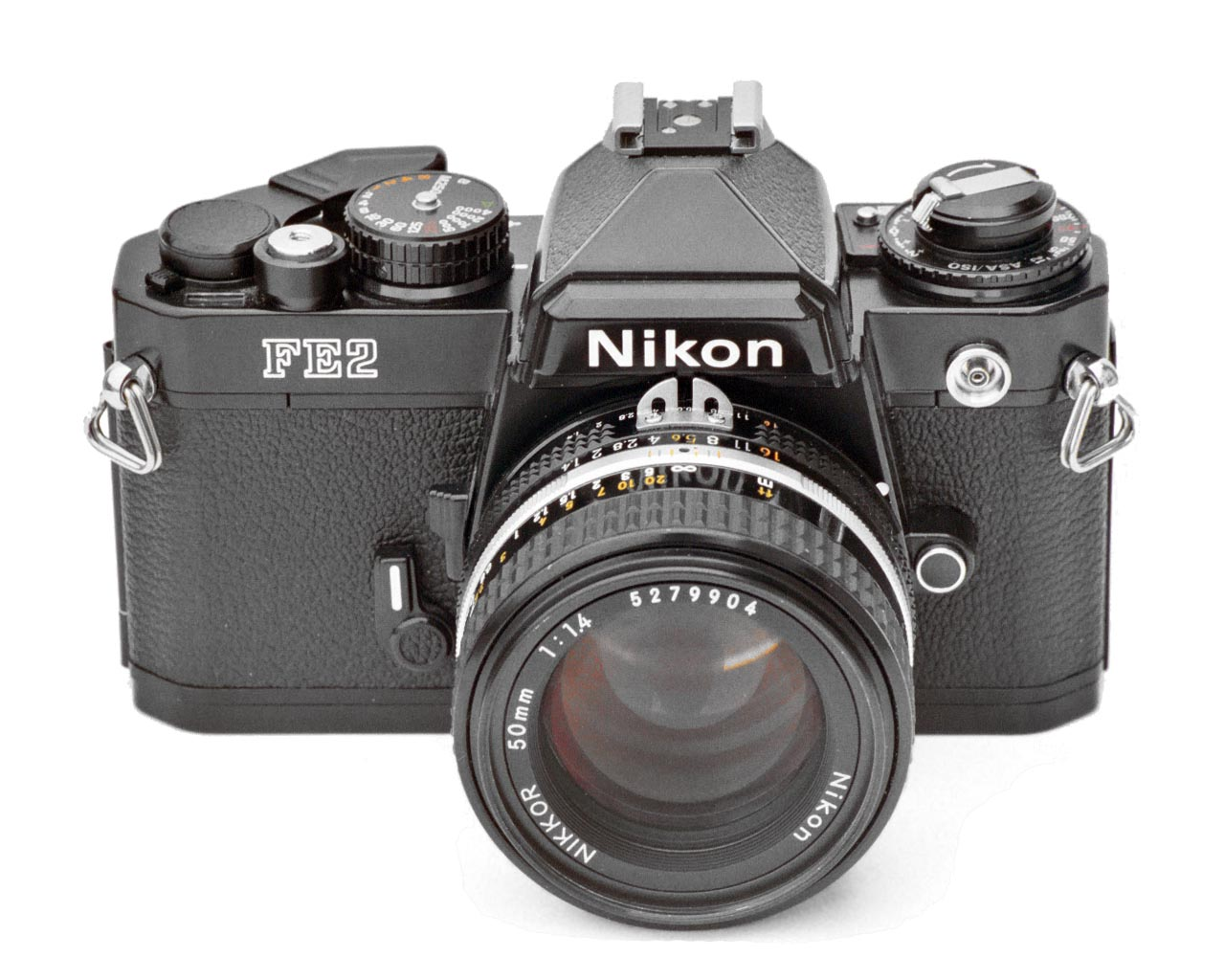
- Nikon FE2 (black) with Nikkor AI-S 50 mm f/1.4 lens

Overview
- Maker: Nippon Kogaku K. K.
- Type: 35mm film SLR
- Released: 1983
- Production: 1983-1987

Lens
- Lens mount: Nikon F lens mount
- Compatible lenses: Nikon F-mount lenses supporting automatic indexing (AI) with some exceptions

Sensor/medium
- Film speed: ISO 12 – 4000
- Film advance: manual

Focusing
- Focus modes: manual

Exposure/metering
- Exposure modes: Aperture priority, Manual
- Exposure metering: TTL metering, EV 1 to EV 18 at ASA/ISO 100 and with 50mm f/1.4 lens
- Metering modes: center-weighted

Flash
- Flash: ISO standard Hot shoe
- Flash synchronization: 1/250 s

Shutter
- Shutter: electronically controlled with mechanical backup
- Shutter speed range: 8s – 1/4000s; M250 (mechanical 1/250s); Bulb (B)

Viewfinder
- Viewfinder: fixed eye-level pentaprism
- Viewfinder magnification: 0.86x with 50 mm lens at infinity
- Frame coverage: 93%

General
- Battery: 2x 1.5V LR44
- Optional motor drives: MD-11, MD-12
- Dimensions: 142.5 × 57.5 × 90 mm (3.5 x 5.61 x 2.26 in)
- Weight: 550 g (19 oz)
- Made in: Japan

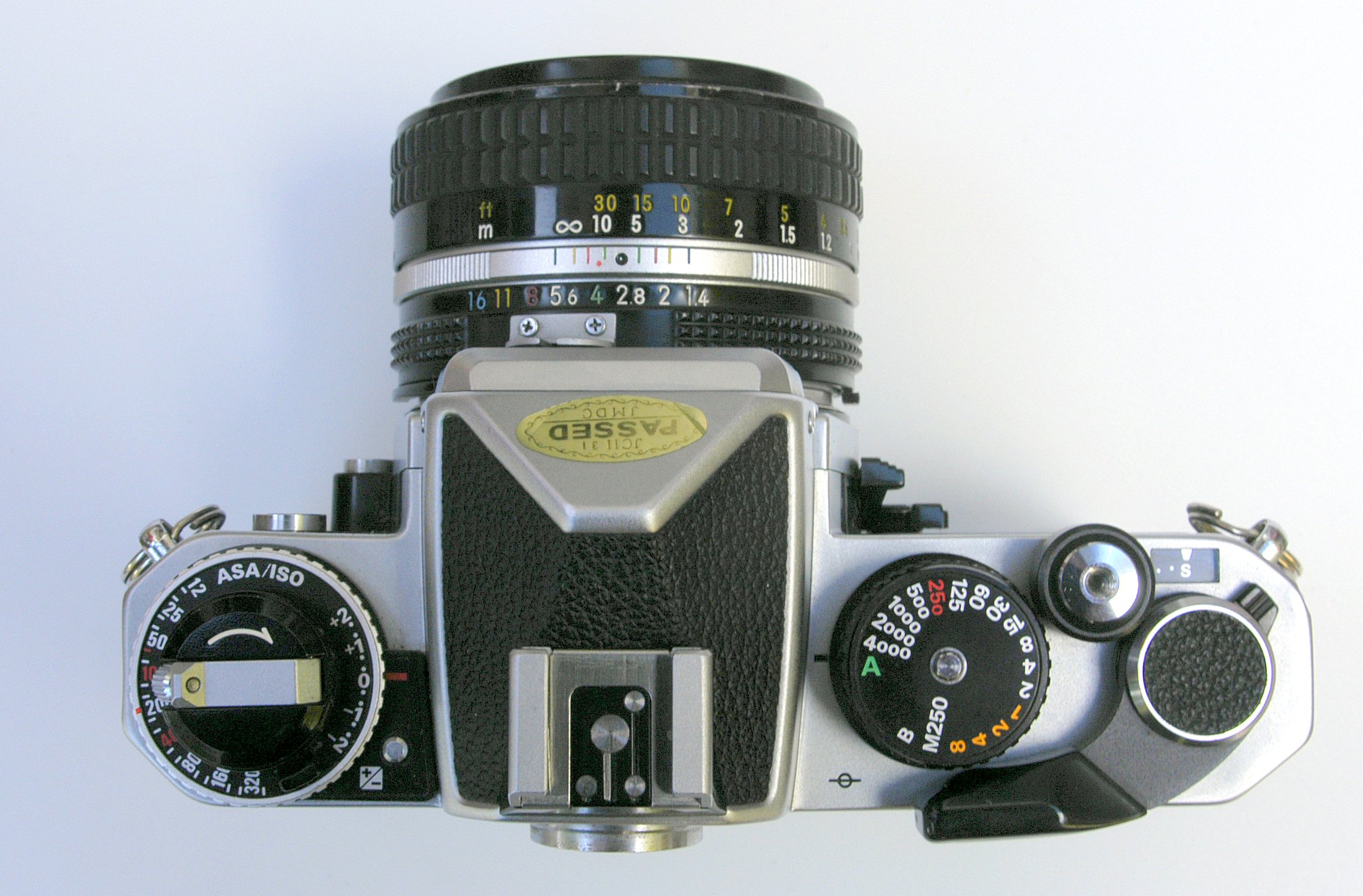
FE2 from above

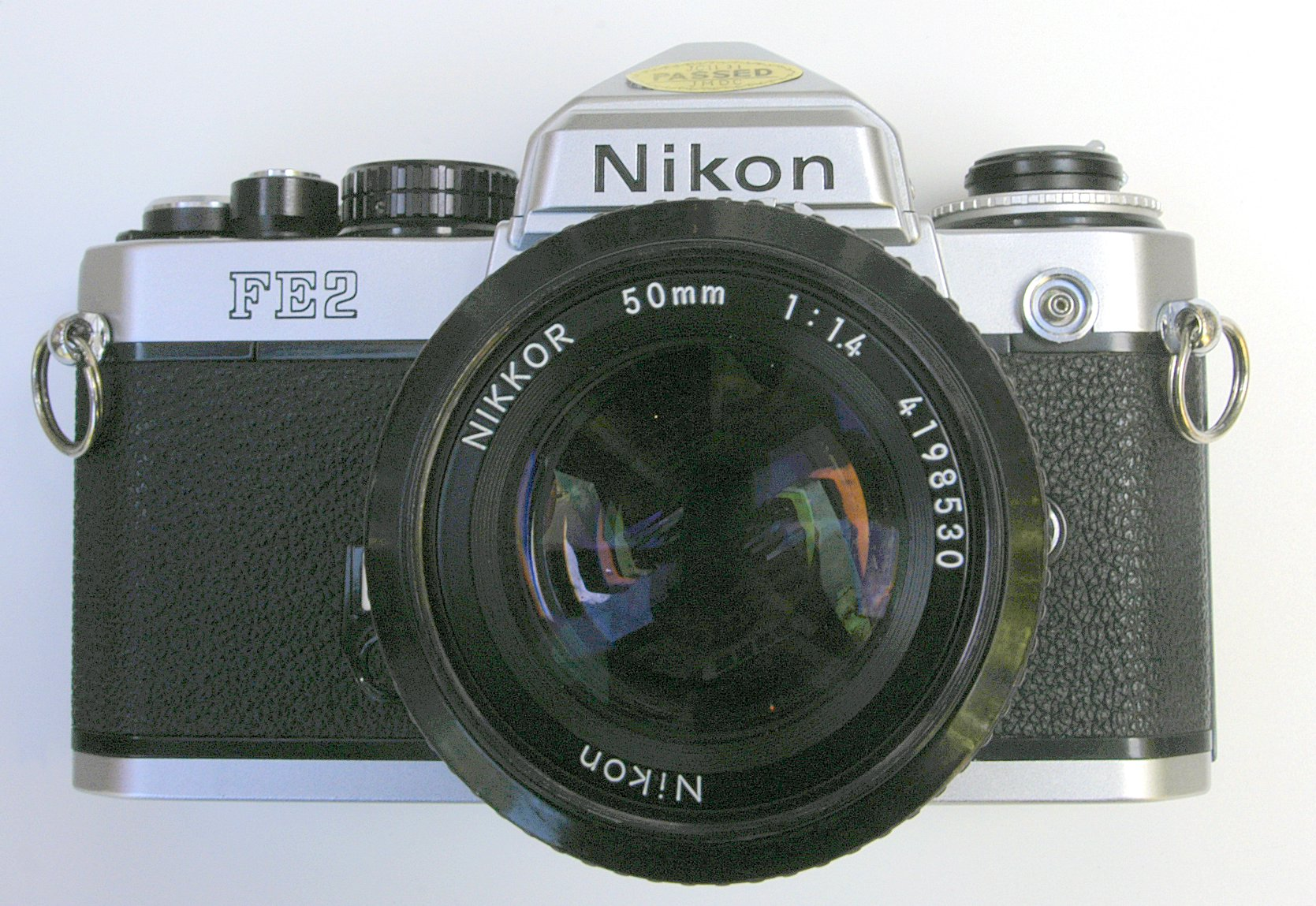
Chromed FE2 with 50 mm F/1.4 lens

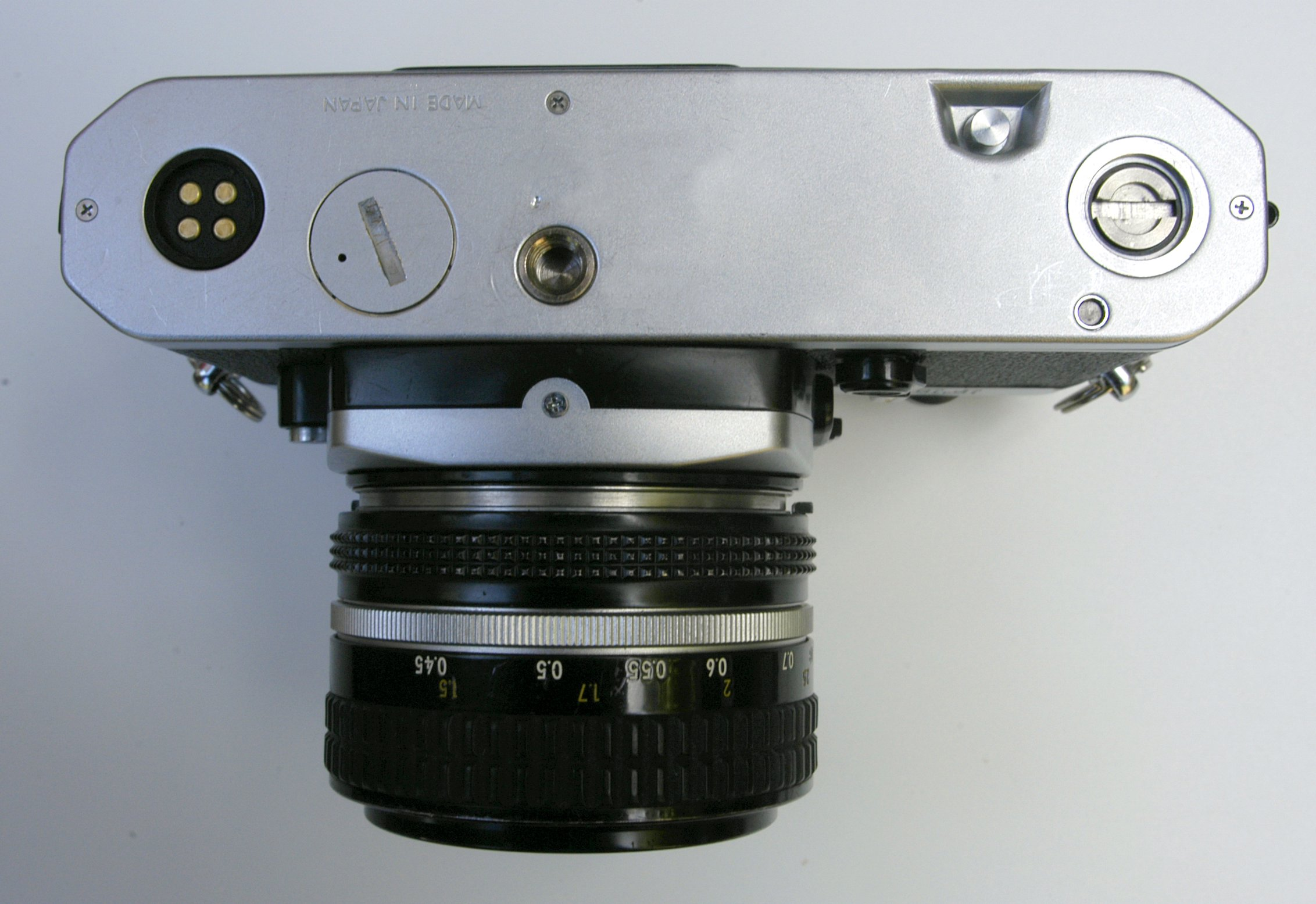
FE2 underside

The Nikon FE2 is a 35 mm single lens reflex (SLR) camera manufactured by Nippon Kogaku K. K. (Nikon Corporation since 1988) in Japan from 1983 to 1987. The FE2 uses a Nikon-designed vertical-travel focal-plane shutter with a speed range of 8 to 1/4000th second, plus Bulb and flash X-sync of 1/250th second. It was available in two colors: black with chrome trim and all-black. The introductory US list price for the chrome body only (no lens) was $446. Note that SLRs are usually sold for 30 to 40 percent below list price.

The FE2 is a member of the classic Nikon compact F-series 35 mm SLRs and was built upon a compact but rugged copper-aluminum alloy chassis similar (but not identical) to the ones used by the earlier Nikon FM (introduced in 1977), FE (1978), and FM2 (1982) cameras. The FM2/FE2 twins were improved successors to the successful Nikon FM/FE cameras with enhanced features, but minor external controls and cosmetic differences. The Nikon FA of 1983 also used this basic body design and the limited-production Nikon FM3A of 2001 continued to use it until 2006.

== Features ==
The FE2 accepts all lenses with the Nikon F bayonet mount (introduced in 1959) supporting the Automatic Indexing (AI) feature (introduced in 1977). The contemporary Nikon-made AI lenses were the Nikkor AI-S, Nikkor AI, and Nikon Series E types. During the early 1980s, Nippon Kogaku manufactured approximately 70 Nikkor AI-S and Nikon Series E branded lenses. They ranged from a Fisheye-Nikkor 6 mm f/2.8 220˚ circular fisheye to a Reflex-Nikkor 2000 mm f/11 super telephoto. The AF-S Nikkor, AF-I Nikkor, AF Nikkor D, and AF Nikkor auto-focus lenses are also AI types.

Nikon's most recent 35 mm film SLR lenses, the AF Nikkor G type (introduced in 2000) lacking an aperture control ring, and the AF Nikkor DX type (2003) with image circles sized for Nikon's digital SLRs, will mount, but will not function properly. IX Nikkor lenses (1996), for Nikon's Advanced Photo System (APS) film SLRs, must not be mounted, as their rear elements will intrude far enough into the mirror box to cause damage.

Accessories for the FE2 included the Nikon MD-12 motor drive (automatic film advance up to 3.2 frames per second), the Nikon MF-16 databack (sequential numbering, time or date stamping on the film), and the Nikon SB-15 (guide number 82/25 (feet/meters) at ASA/ISO 100) and Nikon SB-16B (guide number 105/32 (feet/meters) at ASA/ISO 100) electronic flashes.

The FE2 is a battery-powered (two S76 or A76, or one 1/3N) electro-mechanically controlled manual focus SLR with manual exposure control or aperture-priority auto-exposure. It has a match-needle exposure control system using two needles pointing along a vertical shutter speed scale on the left side of the viewfinder to indicate the readings of the built-in 60/40 percent center-weighted light meter versus the actual camera settings. This system can be traced back to the Nikkormat EL (in the USA/Canada; Nikomat EL, rest of the world) of 1972 and continued until 2006 with the Nikon FM3A. The viewfinder also has an interchangeable Type K2 focusing screen with Nikon's standard 3 mm split image rangefinder and 1 mm micro-prism collar focusing aids plus 12 mm etched circle indicating the area of the meter center-weighting.

The major improvements in the FE2 compared to the FE are a brighter viewing screen, provision for through-the-lens (TTL) off-the-film (OTF) electronic flash automation (essentially identical to the system introduced in the Nikon FG in 1982) and a quartz oscillator timed, bearing-mounted, titanium-bladed shutter reaching an ultra-fast top speed of 1/4000th second (plus world's fastest X-sync to 1/250th second). This design is an improved electronically controlled version of the mechanical shutter introduced in the Nikon FM2, with eight honeycomb-patterned blades instead of nine and shutter curtain travel time further reduced to 3.3 milliseconds from 3.6 milliseconds. The FE2 also introduced a unique rotating flywheel plus inertial mass damping system to minimize mirror shock vibration effects and render a mirror lock-up feature unnecessary.

== Design history ==
The 1970s and 1980s were an era of intense competition between the major SLR brands: Nikon, Canon, Minolta, Pentax and Olympus. Between circa 1975 to 1985, there was a dramatic shift away from heavy all-metal manual mechanical camera bodies to much more compact bodies with integrated circuit (IC) electronic automation. In addition, because of rapid advances in electronics, the brands continually leapfrogged each other with models having new or more automatic features. The industry was trying to expand out from the saturated high-end professional market and appeal to the large mass of low-end amateur photographers itching to move up from compact automatic leaf-shutter rangefinder (RF) cameras to the more versatile SLR but were intimidated by the need to learn all details of its operation.

The FE2 was intended by Nikon as a quality alternative to the more cheaply built 35 mm amateur SLRs by other manufacturers of the day. It can be described as Nippon Kogaku's Nikon FM2 mechanical (springs, gears, levers) camera with precision electronic controls grafted on. Its unusual roots were most obvious in its backup ability to operate without batteries – albeit in a limited fashion: completely manual mechanical control with limited shutter speeds (1/250th second, marked M250, or Bulb) and without the light meter. The FE2 shared the luxurious bearing-mounted film advance and transport mechanism of its other high-level cameras, and many were used by professional photographers. The FE2's deliberately conservative external features (no program modes or matrix metering) were not intended to appeal to beginners, but rather to experienced photographers who required a reliable camera capable of withstanding extremes of climate, impacts, and extended use. Nikon believed that advanced amateur photographers were not interested in every possible automated bell and whistle, but rather the highest possible quality and precision.

Despite not being as popular as other contemporary SLRs with more advanced features but lower construction quality, the Nikon FE2 has stood the test of time and is now considered one of the finest SLRs of its generation. It is highly sought after by collectors and commands prices close to its original retail price in mint condition.

== Notable appearances in media ==
A black Nikon FE2 is used by Cailee Spaeny's character (Jessie Cullen) in the 2024 film Civil War, directed by Alex Garland.

== Bibliography ==
- "Nikon MF/AF Bodies – Lens Compatibility" http://www.nikonlinks.com/unklbil/bodylens.htm retrieved 3 January 2006
- Anonymous. "Modern Tests: Nikon FE2 Adds Superfast Shutter And Much More" pp. 86–92. Modern Photography, Volume 47, Number 10; October 1983.
- Anonymous. "Modern Photography's Annual Guide '84: 48 Top Cameras: Nikon FE2" p. 83. Modern Photography, Volume 47, Number 12; December 1983.
- Anonymous. Nikon FE2 Advertisement. "Instead of owning a camera designed for millions maybe you need a camera engineered for a few." pp. 20–21. Modern Photography, Volume 47, Number 7; July 1983. pp. 30–31. Modern Photography, Volume 48, Number 2; February 1984.
- Anonymous. Nikon FE2 Advertisement. "The Nikon FE2. Because not every artist uses a brush and palette." pp. 66–67. Modern Photography, Volume 48, Number 11; November 1984.
- Anonymous. KEH Camera Brokers catalogue, Sept 1996. Atlanta, GA: KEH Camera Brokers, 1996.
- Comen, Paul. Magic Lantern Guides: Nikon Classic Cameras; F, FE, FE2, FA and Nikkormat F series. First Edition. Magic Lantern Guides. Rochester, NY: Silver Pixel Press, 1996. ISBN 1-883403-31-6
- Keppler, Herbert. "Keppler's SLR Notebook: Vibration: How Big An SLR Bogeyman???" pp. 38–39, 134, 136. Modern Photography, Volume 48, Number 12; December 1984.
- Peterson, B. Moose. Magic Lantern Guides: Nikon Classic Cameras, Volume II; F2, FM, EM, FG, N2000 (F-301), N2020 (F-501), EL series. First Edition. Magic Lantern Guides. Rochester, NY: Silver Pixel Press, 1996. ISBN 1-883403-38-3
- Stafford, Simon and Rudi Hillebrand & Hans-Joachim Hauschild. The New Nikon Compendium: Cameras, Lenses & Accessories since 1917. 2004 Updated North American Edition. Asheville, NC: Lark Books, 2003. ISBN 1-57990-592-7

Class	1950s					1960s										1970s										1980s										1990s										2000s										2020s			
Class	55	56	57	58	59	60	61	62	63	64	65	66	67	68	69	70	71	72	73	74	75	76	77	78	79	80	81	82	83	84	85	86	87	88	89	90	91	92	93	94	95	96	97	98	99	00	01	02	03	04	05	06	07	08	09	...	20	21	22
Professional					F																					F3																																	
Professional																	F2												F3AF					F4								F5								F6									
High-end																													FA					F-801 (N8008)/ F-801s (N8008s)				F90 (N90)		F90X (N90s)					F100														
Mid-range																																F-501 (N2020)				F-601 (N6006)				F70 (N70)						F80 (N80)													
Mid-range																		EL / EL2 /ELW						FE					FE2							F-601M (N6000)				F70 (N70)						F80 (N80)													
Mid-range											FT		FTn/ FT2/ FT3										FM					FM2/FM2n																			FM3A												
Mid-range											FS												FM					FM2/FM2n																			FM3A												
Entry-level																																																											
Entry-level																																										Pronea S																	
Entry-level																																									Pronea 600i/6i																		
Entry-level								Nikkorex F / Nikkor J																	EM			FG			F-301 (N2000)				F-401s (N4004s)					F50 (N50)							F65 (N65 / U)		F75 (N75 / U2)										
Entry-level						35		35 II		Auto 35																				FG-20			F-401 (N4004)				F-401x (N5005)								F60 (N60)			F55 (N55)											
Entry-level									Zoom 35																																FM10 / FE10																		
Class	55	56	57	58	59	60	61	62	63	64	65	66	67	68	69	70	71	72	73	74	75	76	77	78	79	80	81	82	83	84	85	86	87	88	89	90	91	92	93	94	95	96	97	98	99	00	01	02	03	04	05	06	07	08	09	...	20	21	22
Class	1950s					1960s										1970s										1980s										1990s										2000s										2020s			
