= FS1 (disambiguation) =

Fox Sports 1 is an American sports-oriented cable and satellite television channel.

FS1 may also refer to:

- FS1 (Austrian TV channel), a community television station in Salzburg, Austria
- Former name of the Austrian TV station ORF eins
- Socket FS1, a CPU socket that is implemented in notebook computer platforms from AMD
- Yamaha FS1, a moped of the 1970s
- FS1 Flight Simulator, a 1979 video game
- Foundation Stage 1, term used for nursery education in England
- FS1, an unmanned German lightship

== See also ==
- 1 FS, USAF 1st fighter squadron
- FS (disambiguation)
- FSI (disambiguation)
