= FS =

FS, fS or fs may refer to:

== Arts and entertainment ==
- FS (musician) (real name Fred Sargolini), American dubstep producer and DJ from New York
- Florin Salam, Romanian manele musician often called by his initials FS
- FS Catalogue, a numbered list of all compositions by Carl Nielsen
- FS Film, a Finnish film distributor
- Flight simulator, a professional simulator of planes
  - Flight simulation video game, a video game version of simulators
    - Microsoft Flight Simulator, an amateur flight simulator series
      - Microsoft Flight Simulator X (FSX), the 2006 edition
      - Microsoft Flight Simulator (2020 video game) (FS), the 2020 edition
- Fox Sports (United States), the sports programming division of Fox Corporation
  - Fox Sports 1 (FS1)
  - Fox Sports 2 (FS2)

== Books ==
- Halo: First Strike, a novel written by Eric Nylund for the Halo series, published in 2003

== Businesses and organizations ==
- Fagoppositionens Sammenslutning, a Danish trade union federation
- FamilySearch, a genealogical organization and website
- Farmers' and Settlers' Association of New South Wales (F & S), Australia
- Fortune Systems, a defunct American computer manufacturer
- Frankfurt School of Finance & Management, a business school in Frankfurt, Germany
- FS Services, an agricultural supply cooperative, now Growmark
- Full Sail University, a university in Florida, US
- Future Shop, a defunct Canadian consumer electronics retailer
- Federal Signal, a warning systems manufacturer

=== Transportation ===
- Ferrocarril de Sóller, a railway on Majorca
- Ferrovie dello Stato Italiane, Italian state railways
  - Trenitalia, its subsidiary for operating passenger rail transport
- First ScotRail, a British rail train operator
- ItAli Airlines (former IATA code: FS), a former Italian airline (2003–2011)
- Flyr (airline) (former IATA code: FS), a former Norwegian airline (2020–2023)

== Science and technology ==
- Feldspar, a group of silicate minerals
- Fin-stabilized projectile, such as the APFSDS or HEAT-FS
- Flank speed, a ship's true maximum speed
- Frameshift mutation, a genetic mutation
- Fujita scale (F-Scale), or Fujita-Pearson scale, a scale for rating tornado intensity
- Full scale, in electronics and signal processing, the maximum amplitude a system can present
- Marine flooding surface, a sharp contact between deep-water and shallow-water facies in sequence stratigraphy
- Sampling rate (symbol $f_s$), in communications theory
- Fourier series, a mathematical tool used for analyzing periodic functions

=== Computing ===
- FS register, in X86fs computer architecture
- File Separator, a character in the C0 and C1 control codes
- File server, a form of disk storage
- File system, in computer science and database theory
- Flipnote Studio, a DSi animation software
- Forward secrecy, a property of cryptographic systems
- Fullscreen, a picture format in 4:3 aspect ratio, as opposed to widescreen
- IBM Future Systems project a failed IBM project to develop a computer line to replace System/360
- Feature structure, a set of attribute–value pairs

=== Medicine ===
- Felty's syndrome, autoimmune disease, with rheumatoid arthritis, enlargement of the spleen and too few neutrophils in the blood
- Fibrin sealant, a type of surgical tissue adhesive used during surgery to control bleeding
- Flight Surgeon, a physician who is responsible for the medical evaluation, certification and treatment of aviation personnel
- Fractional shortening, of the heart
- Formularium Slovenicum, Slovenian addendum to the European Pharmacopoeia

=== Physics ===
- Femtosecond (fs), an SI unit of time
- Siemens (unit) Femtosiemens, an SI unit of electric conductance
- Fine structure, in atomic physics

== Military ==
- Freight and supply ship (FS), a US Army classification for a type of cargo ship
- Fire support, artillery or close air support for combat operations
- Flight Sergeant, a non-commissioned officer in some air forces
- Flight Surgeon, physician primarily responsible for the medical evaluation, certification and treatment of aviation personnel
- French Ship (FS), a NATO prefix for ships of the French Navy

== Sport ==
- Free safety, one variation of the defensive back position in American football
- Free skating, the second part of a figure skating competition
- Formula Student, a student engineering competition held annually in the UK

== Other uses ==
- Federal Standard 595, a United States federal standard defining color shades
- Financial Secretary (Hong Kong)
- For Sale (disambiguation)
- Foundation Stage, term used for early childhood education in the UK
- Franco's Spain, Spain under the leadership of Francisco Franco
- French Southern Territories (FIPS PUB 10-4 territory code); excludes the Terre Adélie portion of Antarctica
- Full service (disambiguation)
- FontStruct, a font-making website
- Nikkormat FS, a Nikon film SLR camera
