= Nikon EM =

1978 35mm single-lens reflex camera

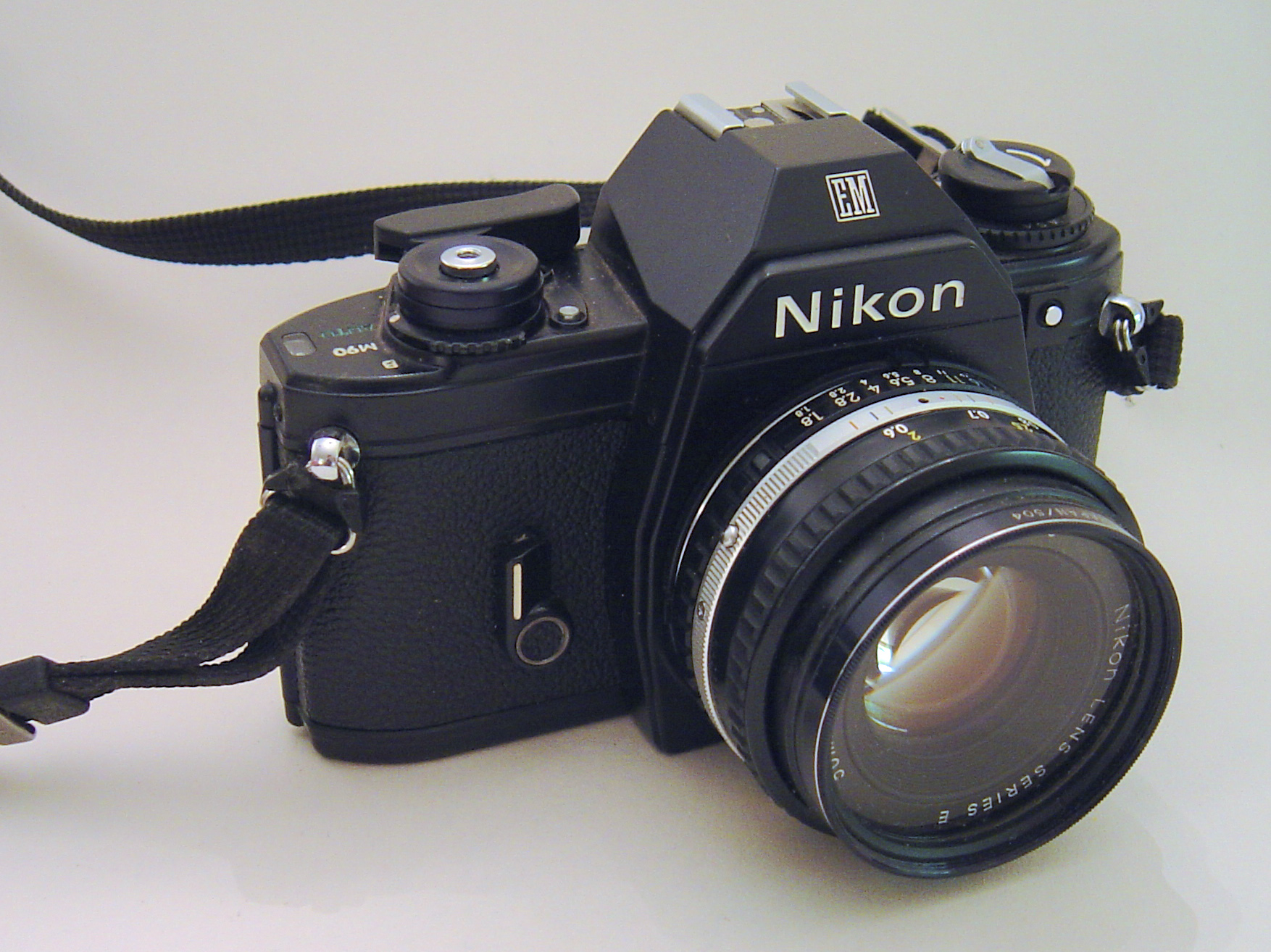
- Nikon EM 35 mm camera with Nikon Series E 50 mm lens

Overview
- Maker: Nippon Kogaku K. K.
- Type: 35 mm film SLR
- Released: 1979
- Production: 1979 - 1982

Lens
- Lens mount: Nikon F lens mount
- Lens: Interchangeable

Focusing
- Focus: Manual

Exposure/metering
- Exposure: Aperture priority 60/40 center-weighted

Flash
- Flash: ISO standard Hot shoe

Shutter
- Frame rate: Manually wound, 2 frames/s with Nikon MD-E motor drive

General
- Dimensions: 135×54×86 mm (5.3×2.1×3.4 in)
- Weight: 460 g (16 oz)
- Made in: Japan

The Nikon EM is a beginner's level, interchangeable lens, 35 mm film, single lens reflex (SLR) camera. It was manufactured by Nippon Kogaku K. K. (today Nikon Corporation) in Japan from 1978 to 1982 (available new from dealer stock until circa 1984). The camera was designed for and marketed to the growing market of new photographers then entering the SLR buyer's market. The EM uses a Seiko MFC-E focal plane shutter with a speed range of 1 to 1/1000 second plus Bulb and flash X-sync of 1/90 second. It is 86 mm (3.4 in) high, 135 mm (5.3 in) wide, 54 mm (2.1 in) deep and weighed 460 grams (16 oz). Unlike most Nikons of the time, it was available only in black. The EM has no full manual exposure mode capability, but instead was intended to be used by inexperienced photographers who could not easily master the intricacies of shutter speeds and f-stops. There were also significant changes to the EM's mechanical and electrical components to reduce its production cost relative to previous Nikon cameras: dimensional tolerances weren't as tight, there were no ball bearings in the film advance mechanism, and no high-quality titanium shutter. The introductory US list price for the body was only $144.95, or $189.95 including the Nikon 1.8e lens.

The EM accepts nearly all lenses with the Nikon F bayonet mount except lenses introduced in 1959, non-AI lenses will damage the lensmount, it does support the automatic indexing (AI) feature introduced in 1977. The contemporary Nikon-made AI lenses were the Nikkor AI-S, Nikkor AI and Nikon Series E types. The AF-S Nikkor, AF-I Nikkor, AF Nikkor D and AF Nikkor autofocus lenses are also AI types. Nikon's later 35 mm film SLR lenses, the AF Nikkor G type introduced in 2000, lack an aperture control ring, and the AF Nikkor DX type (2003) with image circles sized for Nikon's digital SLRs will mount but will not function properly. IX Nikkor lenses introduced in 1996 for Nikon's Advanced Photo System SLRs must not be mounted to an EM, as their rear elements will intrude far enough into the mirror box to cause damage.

== Design history ==
Beginning in 1977 with the advanced amateur Nikon FM, there was a complete overhaul of the entire Nikon SLR line. The 1970s and 1980s were an era of intense competition among major SLR brands Nikon, Canon, Minolta, Pentax and Olympus. Between 1975 and 1985 there was a shift away from heavy all-metal manual mechanical camera bodies to much more compact bodies with housings made of lighter materials and electronic automation controlled by integrated circuits. Because of rapid advances in electronics, the brands continually leapfrogged each other with models having new or more automatic features. The industry was trying to expand out from the saturated high-end professional market and appeal to the large mass of amateur photographers who wanted to move up from compact automatic leaf-shutter rangefinder cameras to an SLR, but were intimidated by the need to learn the details of operating a traditional SLR.

Although Nikon cameras like the F2 of 1971 were highly regarded by professional photographers, the F2's bulk, expense, and intricacy made it a slow seller to most amateurs and beginners. Although Nikon's mid-level Nikkormat FT (1965) and EL (1972) camera series were made almost as well as the Nikon F and F2, their relatively high price turned amateurs toward less expensive models from other manufacturers.

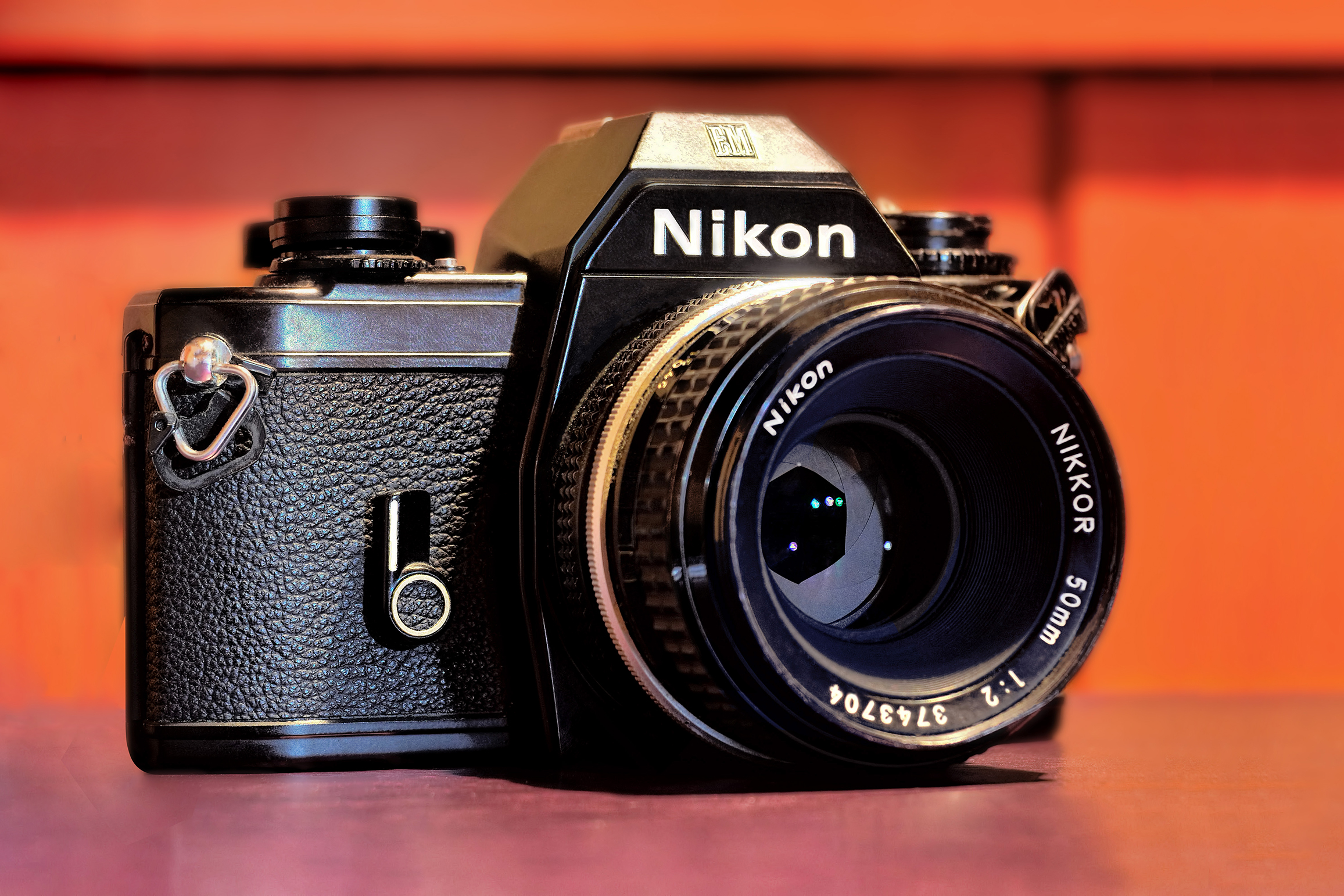
Nikon EM & nikkor 50mm ƒ/2

== Features ==
The Nikon EM formed the base of the new line. On introduction it was the smallest and cheapest Nikon SLR ever made. It was an electromechanically controlled, manual-focus camera powered by button batteries. The EM featured a lightweight, compact copper-aluminum alloy body and fiberglass-reinforced polycarbonate plastic top and bottom covers, plus aperture priority semiautomatic exposure control governed by a built-in 60/40 percent centerweighted, silicon photodiode light meter. A left side viewfinder galvanometer needle pointer indicated the exposure on a shutter speed scale. The viewfinder also had Nikon's standard 3 mm split image rangefinder and 1 mm microprism collar focusing aids, but the focus screen was fixed. The viewfinder is dimmer than those in the semi-professional Nikons since the expensive prisms of the latter were not used. The camera is also fitted with a low-light exposure warning in the form of an audible 'beep'.

Accessories for the EM included a highly automated dedicated electronic flash unit, the Nikon SB-E (guide number 56/17 (feet/meters) at ASA 100) and a very small power winder, the Nikon MD-E (motorized film advance at 2 frames per second). There was also a new Nikon Series E range of lenses. The Series E lens lineup in 1980 included a 28 mm ƒ/2.8 wide angle, a 35 mm ƒ/2.5 semi-wide angle, a 50 mm ƒ/1.8 normal, a 100 mm ƒ/2.8 short telephoto and a 75–150 mm ƒ/3.5 zoom, with the subsequent addition of a 70–210 mm ƒ/4 zoom, and a 135 mm ƒ/2.8 medium telephoto. These lenses were intended to enhance the EM's appeal to new users, as inexpensive but good quality alternatives to expensive Nikkor-branded lenses.

The EM also had one very rare feature for an electronically controlled camera. Nippon Kogaku's philosophy that a camera must always work when called upon resulted in the EM's backup ability to operate without batteries, albeit in a limited fashion: mechanical control with one available fixed shutter speed (1/90 second, marked "M90") or fully-manual, operator-controlled open-shutter duration marked "B" for "Bulb", and without the light meter. A little-known feature of the EM is that when the battery is removed, the "Auto" setting produces a shutter speed of approximately 1/1000 sec. This is documented in the factory repair manual.

The EM and its E-system accessories were Nippon Kogaku's first attempt to reach the low end of the SLR market. Called internally “SLR Camera for Women”, the EM was designed to provide style, with its exterior contours designed Italian automobile stylist Giorgetto Giugiaro); convenience with a system of dedicated accessories; as much ease of use and automation as was possible in 1979; low cost by dint of a simplified manufacturing process, and the prestige of the Nikon name prominently displayed on the pentaprism housing.

The Nikon EM and its later offshoots the FG and FG-20 were a sales and marketing failure for Nikon. Traditional Nikon owners shunned their cheap construction and lack of manual exposure control. The expected female beginner photographer market also failed to appear, as these photographers rejected the implicit condescension of an aperture-priority-only EM, and instead bought either higher-priced Nikons or other-brand cameras. The less-expensive Series E lenses marketed with the camera also came in for heavy criticism, and Nikon soon dropped the entire line.

Despite its cheaper construction quality, the EM has proved to be as reliable over the years as more expensive Nikons of the era. Although the Series E lenses were unpopular with Nikon buyers, several of the Series E lenses exhibited excellent performance, particularly the 50 mm ƒ/1.8, the 100 mm ƒ/2.8, and the 75–150 mm ƒ/3.5 zoom.

Class	1950s					1960s										1970s										1980s										1990s										2000s										2020s			
Class	55	56	57	58	59	60	61	62	63	64	65	66	67	68	69	70	71	72	73	74	75	76	77	78	79	80	81	82	83	84	85	86	87	88	89	90	91	92	93	94	95	96	97	98	99	00	01	02	03	04	05	06	07	08	09	...	20	21	22
Professional					F																					F3																																	
Professional																	F2												F3AF					F4								F5								F6									
High-end																													FA					F-801 (N8008)/ F-801s (N8008s)				F90 (N90)		F90X (N90s)					F100														
Mid-range																																F-501 (N2020)				F-601 (N6006)				F70 (N70)						F80 (N80)													
Mid-range																		EL / EL2 /ELW						FE					FE2							F-601M (N6000)				F70 (N70)						F80 (N80)													
Mid-range											FT		FTn/ FT2/ FT3										FM					FM2/FM2n																			FM3A												
Mid-range											FS												FM					FM2/FM2n																			FM3A												
Entry-level																																																											
Entry-level																																										Pronea S																	
Entry-level																																									Pronea 600i/6i																		
Entry-level								Nikkorex F / Nikkor J																	EM			FG			F-301 (N2000)				F-401s (N4004s)					F50 (N50)							F65 (N65 / U)		F75 (N75 / U2)										
Entry-level						35		35 II		Auto 35																				FG-20			F-401 (N4004)				F-401x (N5005)								F60 (N60)			F55 (N55)											
Entry-level									Zoom 35																																FM10 / FE10																		
Class	55	56	57	58	59	60	61	62	63	64	65	66	67	68	69	70	71	72	73	74	75	76	77	78	79	80	81	82	83	84	85	86	87	88	89	90	91	92	93	94	95	96	97	98	99	00	01	02	03	04	05	06	07	08	09	...	20	21	22
Class	1950s					1960s										1970s										1980s										1990s										2000s										2020s			
