= FFSS =

FFSS may refer to:

- "FF.SS." – Cioè: "...che mi hai portato a fare sopra a Posillipo se non mi vuoi più bene?", an Italian film
- Swiss Federal Railways, the railway in Switzerland
- Fenelon Falls Secondary School, a high school in Fenelon Falls, Ontario, Canada
- Flat-for-Sale Scheme, a housing development scheme by Hong Kong Housing Society in 1980s
- Free Funeral Service Society, a Burmese funeral service organization
- FFSS. Föreningen För en Segelfri Skärgård

== See also ==
- FFS
- FS
