= MMDS =

MMDS could refer to:

- Multichannel multipoint distribution service, a wireless telecommunications technology
- Mortality Medical Data System, a system that automate the entry, classification, and retrieval of cause-of-death information reported on death certificates in many countries
- Modern massive data sets
