= Connecticut Death Index =

Public health data

The Connecticut Death Index is maintained by the Connecticut Department of Public Health and list all people who died in Connecticut starting in 1949. In 2011 the state switched to an online system for recording deaths to replace the hand written death certificates.
