= List of stringent regulatory authorities =

Agencies that strongly protect health and safety in medicine

A stringent regulatory authority (SRA) is a national drug regulation authority which the World Health Organization (WHO) considers to apply stringent standards for quality, safety, and efficacy in its process of regulatory review of drugs and vaccines for marketing authorization.

== WHO definition ==
A stringent regulatory authority is a regulatory authority which is:

a) a member of the International Council for Harmonisation of Technical Requirements for Pharmaceuticals for Human Use (ICH), being the European Commission, the US Food and Drug Administration and the Ministry of Health, Labour and Welfare of Japan also represented by the Pharmaceuticals and Medical Devices Agency (as before 23 October 2015); or

b) an ICH observer, being the European Free Trade Association, as represented by Swissmedic, and Health Canada (as before 23 October 2015); or a regulatory authority associated with an ICH member through a legally-binding, mutual recognition agreement, including Australia, Iceland, Liechtenstein and Norway (as before 23 October 2015).

The concept of an SRA was developed by the WHO Secretariat and The Global Fund to Fight AIDS, Tuberculosis and Malaria to guide decisions regarding procurement of medicines for humanitarian assistance. The idea is that countries with non-SRA drug authorities can use accelerated process to facilitate approval (registration or marketing authorization) of medicines, including vaccines and biologics, which have already been approved by SRAs.

== Replacement by the WHO-Listed Authority (WLA) framework ==
In 2023, WHO formally replaced the SRA designation with the WHO-Listed Authority (WLA) framework, a new system for evaluating and publicly listing national and regional regulatory authorities that meet defined maturity and performance criteria.

Under the transition plan, regulatory authorities previously considered SRAs were granted “transitional WLA” (tWLA) status until March 2027 while undergoing formal evaluation.

The table below lists all currently designated WLAs as of December 2025, including the country, regulatory authority, and the date of first listing.

Country	Authority	Date of first listing
Australia	Therapeutic Goods Administration (TGA)	16 December 2025
Austria	Austrian Federal Office for Safety in Health Care (BASG)	13 May 2024
Belgium	Federal Agency for Medicines and Health Products (FAMHP)	13 May 2024
Bulgaria	Bulgarian Drug Agency (BDA)	13 May 2024
Canada	Health Canada	21 July 2025
Croatia	Agency for Medicinal Products and Medical Devices of Croatia (HALMED)	13 May 2024
Cyprus	Pharmaceutical Services, Ministry of Health (PHS-MoH)	13 May 2024
Czech	State Institute for Drug Control (SUKL)	13 May 2024
Denmark	Danish Medicines Agency (DKMA)	13 May 2024
Estonia	State Agency of Medicines (SAM)	13 May 2024
Finland	Finnish Medicines Agency (FIMEA)	13 May 2024
France	The French National Agency for Medicines and Health Products Safety (ANSM)	13 May 2024
Germany	Federal Institute for Drugs and Medical Devices (BfARM) / PaulEhrlich Institut - Federal Institute for Vaccines and Biomedicines (PEI)	13 May 2024
Greece	National Organization for Medicines (EOF)	13 May 2024
Hungary	National Center for Public Health and Pharmacy (NNGYK)	13 May 2024
Iceland	Icelandic Medicines Agency (IMA)	13 May 2024
Ireland	Health Products Regulatory Authority (HPRA)	13 May 2024
Indonesia	Indonesian Food and Drug Authority (BPOM)	16 December 2025
Italy	Italian Medicines Agency (AIFA)	13 May 2024
Japan	Ministry of Health, Labour and Welfare/Pharmaceuticals and Medical Devices Agency (MHLW/PMDA)	21 July 2025
Latvia	State Agency of Medicines of Latvia (ZVA)	13 May 2024
Liechtenstein	Office of Health/ Medicinal Products Control Agency (LLV)	13 May 2024
Lithuania	State Medicines Control Agency (VVKT)	13 May 2024
Luxembourg	Ministry of Health (MoH)	13 May 2024
Malta	Malta Medicines Authority (MMA)	13 May 2024
Netherlands	Medicines Evaluation Board (CBG-MEB)	13 May 2024
Norway	Norwegian Medical Products Agency (NOMA)	13 May 2024
Poland	Office for Registration of Medicinal Products, Medical Devices and Biocidal Products (URPL)	13 May 2024
Portugal	National Authority of Medicines and Health Products, IP (INFARMED)	13 May 2024
Republic of Korea	Ministry of Food and Drug Safety (MFDS)	26 October 2023 and 21 July 2025
Romania	National Agency for Medicines and Medical Devices of Romania (NAMMDR)	13 May 2024
Singapore	Health Sciences Authority (HSA)	26 October 2023 and 13 May 2024
Slovakia	State Institute for Drug Control (SUKL)	13 May 2024
Slovenia	Agency for Medicinal Products and Medical Devices of the Republic of Slovenia (JAZMP)	13 May 2024
Spain	Spanish Agency of Medicines and Medical Devices (AEMPS)	13 May 2024
Sweden	The Swedish Medical Products Agency (SMPA)	13 May 2024
Switzerland	Swissmedic	26 October 2023
United Kingdom of Great Britain and Northern Ireland	Medicines & Healthcare products Regulatory Agency (MHRA)	21 July 2025
United States of America	Food and Drug Administration (USFDA)	13 May 2024
