= Nikon FG-20 =

1984 35mm single-lens reflex camera

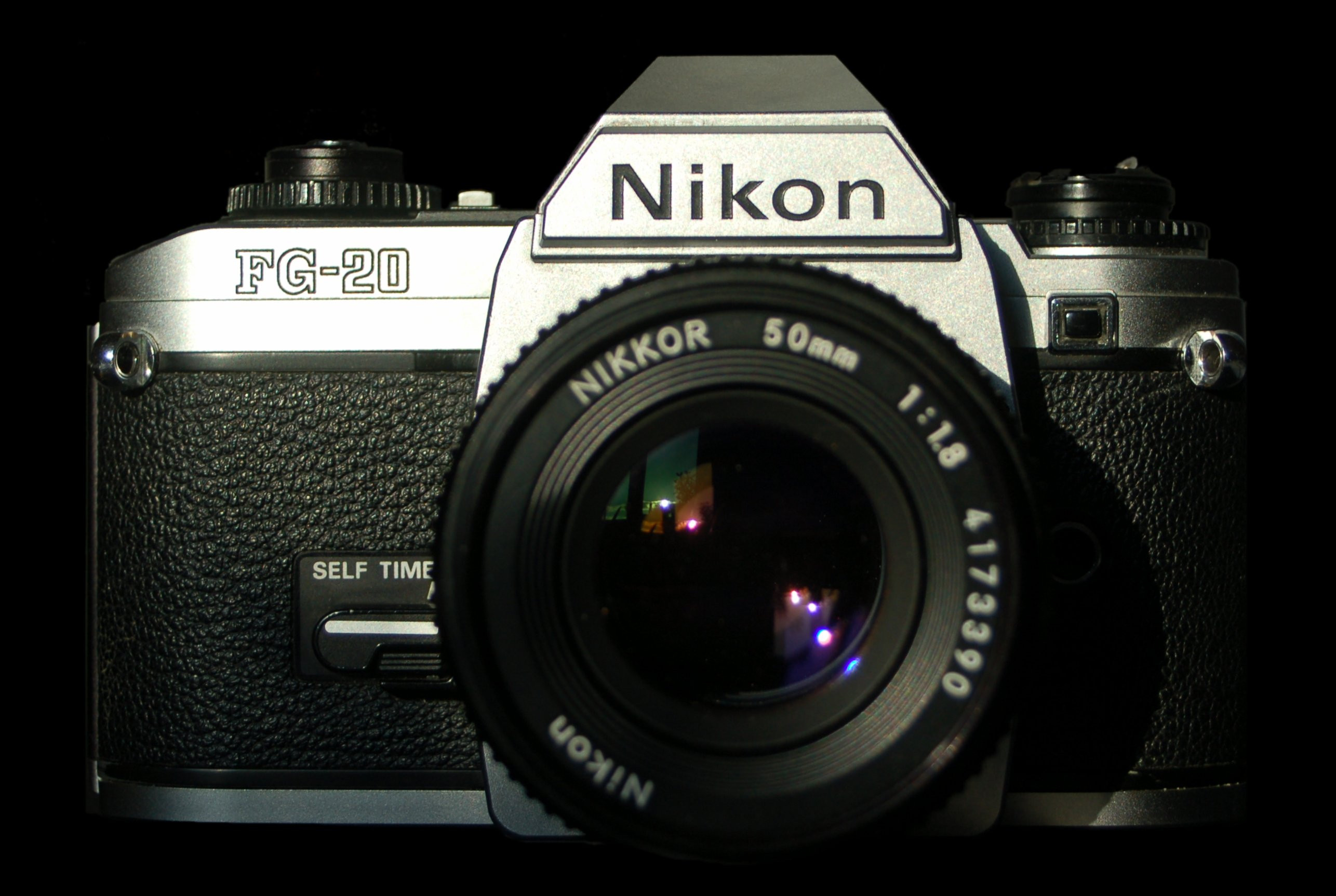
- Nikon FG-20 with Nikkor 50 mm f/1.8

Overview
- Maker: Nikon
- Type: Single lens reflex
- Released: 1984

Lens
- Lens: interchangeable lens, Nikon F-mount
- Compatible lenses: Nikon F-mount lenses supporting automatic indexing (AI) with some exceptions

Sensor/medium
- Film format: 35 mm
- Film size: 36 mm × 24 mm
- Film speed: ISO 25 – 3200
- Film advance: manual

Focusing
- Focus modes: manual

Exposure/metering
- Exposure modes: Aperture priority auto exposure; manual
- Exposure metering: TTL metering, EV 1 to EV 18 at ASA/ISO 100 and with 50 mm f/1.4 lens
- Metering modes: center-weighted

Flash
- Flash: hot shoe
- Flash synchronization: 1/90 s

Shutter
- Shutter: electronically controlled with mechanical backup
- Shutter speed range: 1s – 1/1000s; M90 (mechanical 1/90s); Bulb (B)

Viewfinder
- Viewfinder: fixed eye-level pentaprism
- Viewfinder magnification: 0.86x with 50 mm lens at infinity
- Frame coverage: 92%

General
- Battery: two SR44 or LR44, or one CR1/3N
- Optional motor drives: MD-14, MD-E
- Dimensions: 136×88×54 mm (5.4×3.5×2.1 in)
- Weight: 440 g (16 oz)

The Nikon FG-20 is a 35 mm film single-lens reflex (SLR) camera with interchangeable lenses. It was released in 1984 by Nippon Kogaku K. K. (now the Nikon Corporation) as the successor to the earlier EM and FG cameras. It is actually a downgrade from its most direct predecessor, the FG, lacking the FG's program auto exposure mode. It uses the same vertical-travel metal focal-plane shutter as the FG, with electronically timed speeds from 1 to 1/1000 second as well as bulb and a mechanically timed 1/90-second speed.

The FG-20 could be considered a variant of the FG, as the differences between the two are the omission of program mode, exposure compensation dial, and TTL/OTF flash metering from the FG.

Class	1950s					1960s										1970s										1980s										1990s										2000s										2020s			
Class	55	56	57	58	59	60	61	62	63	64	65	66	67	68	69	70	71	72	73	74	75	76	77	78	79	80	81	82	83	84	85	86	87	88	89	90	91	92	93	94	95	96	97	98	99	00	01	02	03	04	05	06	07	08	09	...	20	21	22
Professional					F																					F3																																	
Professional																	F2												F3AF					F4								F5								F6									
High-end																													FA					F-801 (N8008)/ F-801s (N8008s)				F90 (N90)		F90X (N90s)					F100														
Mid-range																																F-501 (N2020)				F-601 (N6006)				F70 (N70)						F80 (N80)													
Mid-range																		EL / EL2 /ELW						FE					FE2							F-601M (N6000)				F70 (N70)						F80 (N80)													
Mid-range											FT		FTn/ FT2/ FT3										FM					FM2																			FM3A												
Mid-range											FS												FM					FM2																			FM3A												
Entry-level																																																											
Entry-level																																										Pronea S																	
Entry-level																																									Pronea 600i/6i																		
Entry-level								Nikkorex F / Nikkor J																	EM			FG			F-301 (N2000)				F-401s (N4004s)					F50 (N50)							F65 (N65 / U)		F75 (N75 / U2)										
Entry-level						35		35 II		Auto 35																				FG-20			F-401 (N4004)				F-401x (N5005)								F60 (N60)			F55 (N55)											
Entry-level									Zoom 35																																FM10 / FE10																		
Class	55	56	57	58	59	60	61	62	63	64	65	66	67	68	69	70	71	72	73	74	75	76	77	78	79	80	81	82	83	84	85	86	87	88	89	90	91	92	93	94	95	96	97	98	99	00	01	02	03	04	05	06	07	08	09	...	20	21	22
Class	1950s					1960s										1970s										1980s										1990s										2000s										2020s			
