= FSI =

FSI may refer to:

== Economics ==
- Financial services industry
- Financial Secrecy Index, a ranking of secrecy jurisdictions
- Financial Stability Institute, a body of the Bank for International Settlements

== Government and politics ==
- Federation of Italian Socialists (Italian: Federazione dei Socialisti Italiani), a defunct political party of Italy
- Foreign Service Institute, of the United States government
- Foreign Service Institute, India, an agency of the Indian government
- Forest Survey of India
- Fragile States Index, a country ranking method
- Internal Security Forces (French: Forces de Sécurité Intérieure), the national security force of Lebanon

== Technology ==
- First strong isolate, a Unicode character used to support Bidirectional text
- Flame spread index, a material's propensity to burn
- Fluid-structure interaction, in fluid dynamics
- Frequency scanning interferometry, a technique for measuring the distance between two points
- FRISK Software International, an Icelandic antivirus software developer
- FRU Support Interface, a simple bus for low-level access to IBM Power-based hardware
- FSI International, an American equipment manufacturer
- Fuel stratified injection
- Full spectral imaging, in spectroscopy

== Other uses ==
- Fédération Ivoirienne du Scoutisme, the Ivorian Scouting Federation
- Ferrovie dello Stato Italiane, the Italian state-owned railway company
- FlightSafety International, an American aviation training provider
- Floor space index
- Florida Space Institute, of the State University System of Florida
- FontShop International, a German type foundry
- Fox Sports International
- Freeman Spogli Institute for International Studies, at Stanford University
- Free Sons of Israel, a fraternal organization
- IATA code for Henry Post Army Airfield, in Fort Sill, Oklahoma, United States
- Italian Chess Federation (Italian: Federazione Scacchistica Italiana)
- Free-standing insert, a type of advertising: See Sales promotion § Consumer sales promotion types
