= Full service =

Full service or Full Service may refer to:

== Entertainment ==
=== Books ===
- Full Service (book), a 2012 memoir by Scotty Bowers
- Full Service No Waiting, a 1998 album by Peter Case

=== Music ===
- "Full Service", a song by the New Kids on the Block from their album The Block
- Full Service (band), an Austin-based band
- Full Service No Waiting, a 1998 album by Peter Case

=== Radio ===
- Full-service radio, a wide range of programming

== Business ==
- Full Service Network (Pennsylvania), a communications company in Pennsylvania
- Full Service Network, a former interactive television service

== Other uses ==
- A level of hospitality or comprehensiveness
  - An airline with a traditional service level, as opposed to a low-cost carrier
  - A full-service restaurant, where waiters take food orders from customers seated at tables
  - A hotel that offers full standardized industry amenities
  - A car wash where attendants wash the interior as well as the exterior of vehicles
  - A filling station that pumps fuel, washes windshields and checks vehicle fluid levels
  - A rest area that offers a gas station, food, rest rooms and other amenities for travelers
  - A law firm that offers legal services in a variety of areas of law
- A code word or euphemism for prostitution
