= Nikon FG =

1982 35mm single-lens reflex camera

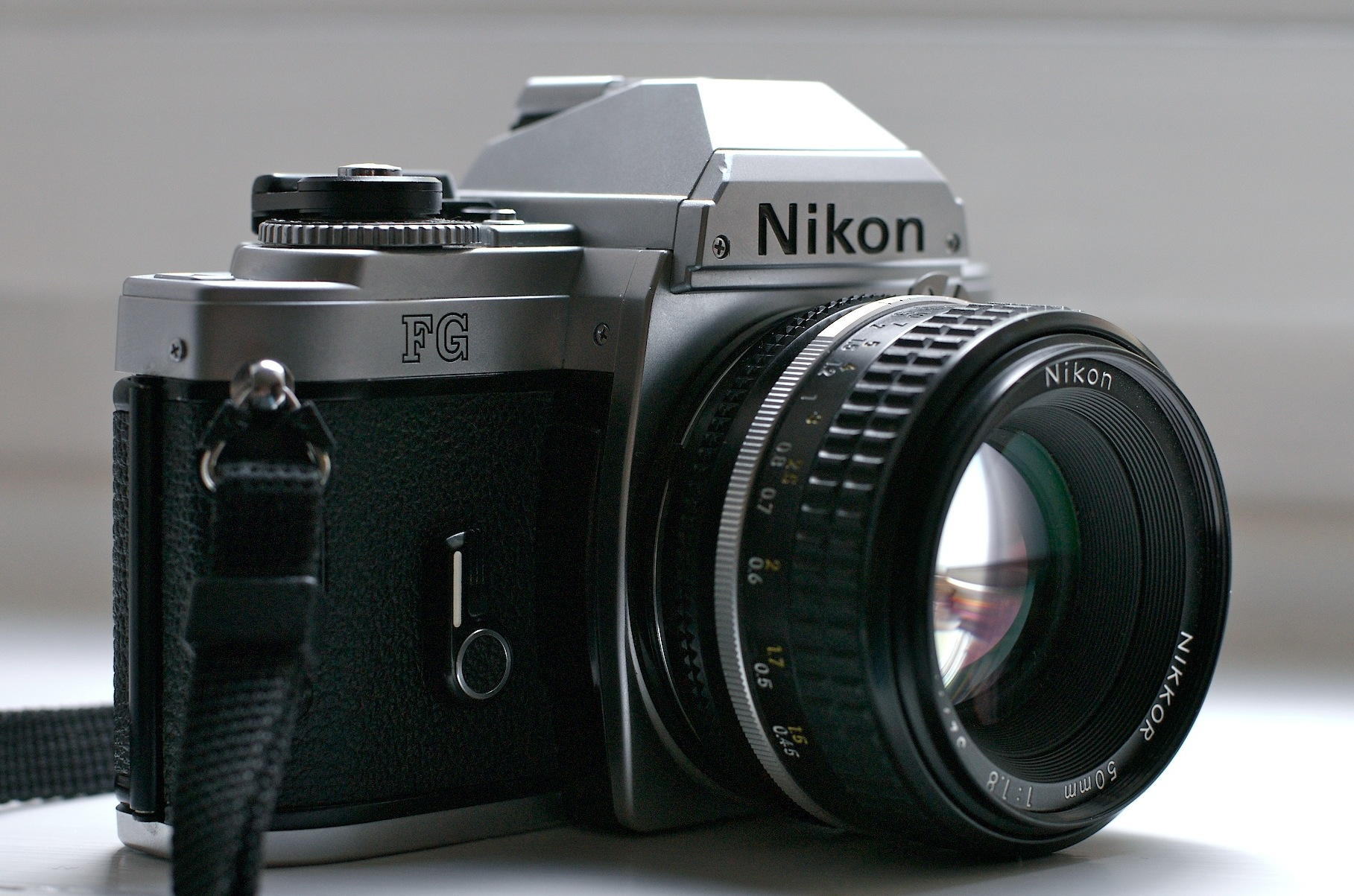

Overview
- Maker: Nikon
- Type: Single lens reflex
- Released: 1982
- Intro price: $322.50

Lens
- Lens: interchangeable lens, Nikon F-mount
- Compatible lenses: Nikon F-mount lenses supporting automatic indexing (AI) with some exceptions

Sensor/medium
- Film format: 35mm
- Film size: 36mm x 24mm
- Film advance: manual
- Film rewind: manual

Focusing
- Focus modes: manual

Exposure/metering
- Exposure modes: Program, Aperture priority, Manual
- Exposure metering: silicon photodiode light meter, TTL metering, EV 1 to EV 18 (f/1.4 at 1s to f/16 at 1/1000s at ASA/ISO 100 and with 50mm f/1.4 lens
- Metering modes: 60/40 percent center-weighted

Flash
- Flash: hot shoe only
- Flash synchronization: 1/90s; normal sync. only
- Compatible flashes: Dedicated Nikon hot shoe mounted flashes with TTL capability; other non-dedicated hot shoe flashes; non-hot shoe flashes with adapter

Shutter
- Shutter: electronically controlled, double speed mechanical backup
- Shutter speed range: 1s – 1/1000s (P, A, M); M90 (1/90s); Bulb (B)
- Continuous shooting: 3.2 frame/s (High), 2 frame/s (Low) with MD-14; 2 frame/s with MD-E

Viewfinder
- Viewfinder: fixed eye-level pentaprism
- Viewfinder magnification: 0.84x
- Frame coverage: 92%

General
- Battery: two SR44 or LR44
- Optional data backs: MF-15
- Optional motor drives: MD-14, MD-E
- Dimensions: 139×86×53 mm (5.5×3.4×2.1 in)
- Weight: 490 g (17 oz)

The Nikon FG is an interchangeable lens, 35 mm film, single-lens reflex (SLR) camera. It was manufactured by Nippon Kogaku K. K. (Nikon Corporation since 1988) in Japan from 1982 to 1984.

The FG was the successor to the Nikon EM camera of 1979 and the predecessor of the Nikon FG-20 of 1984. These three cameras composed Nikon's first family of compact 35mm SLR camera bodies aimed at the amateur photographer. Although the FG had a less advanced shutter than the more expensive Nikons of the day, it had a more sophisticated electronic design compared to earlier electromechanical Nikons.

== Features ==
- First Nikon SLR with programmed auto-exposure (AE).
- First Nikon SLR with TTL (through the lens) flash exposure control from a standard ISO-type hot shoe.
- Electronically controlled focal plane shutter.
- Exposure compensation dial (−2 EV to +2 EV).
- Audio warning system – advises the user of under or over exposure.
- Back-up mechanical M90 and bulb shutter settings enable the use of the camera when batteries are drained.

== Body and Design ==
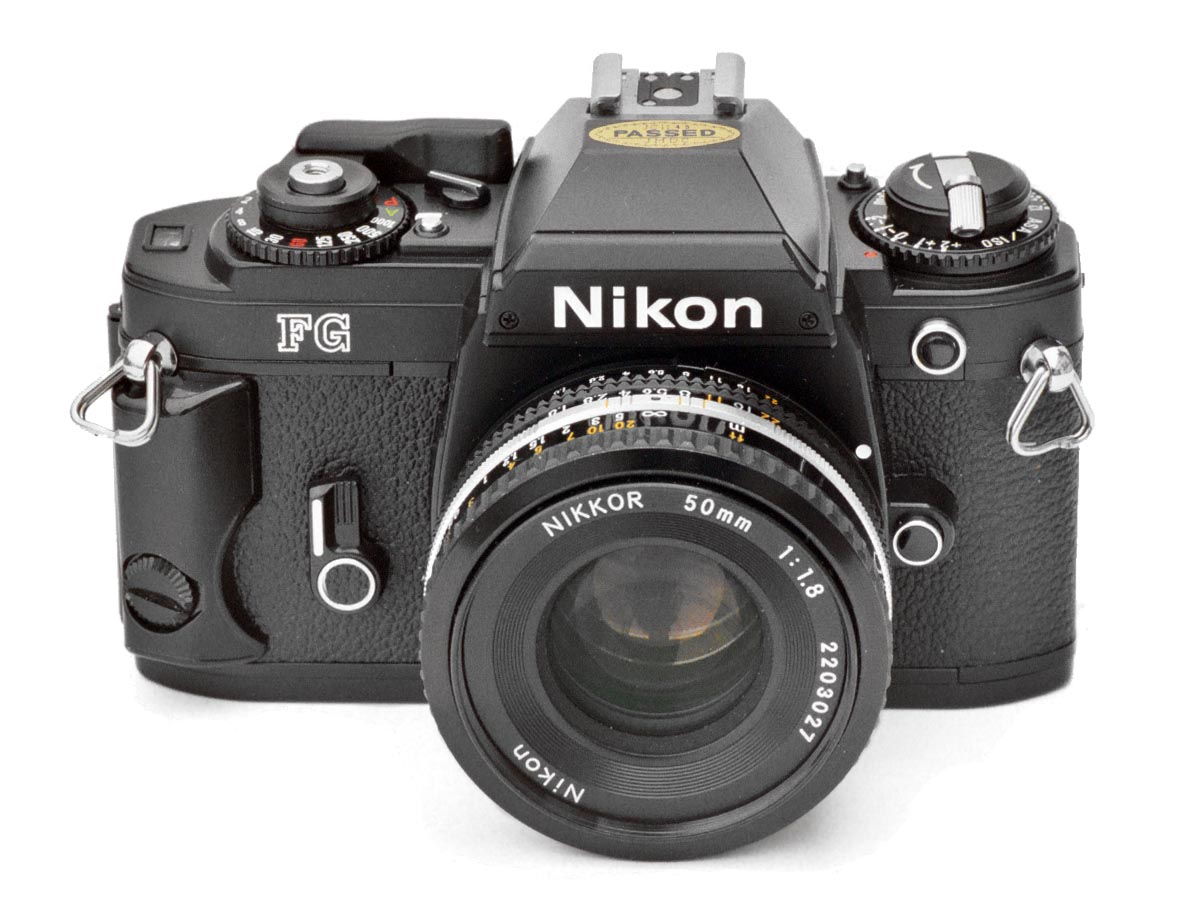
Nikon FG in black finish fitted with a Nikkor 50mm/f1.8 lens

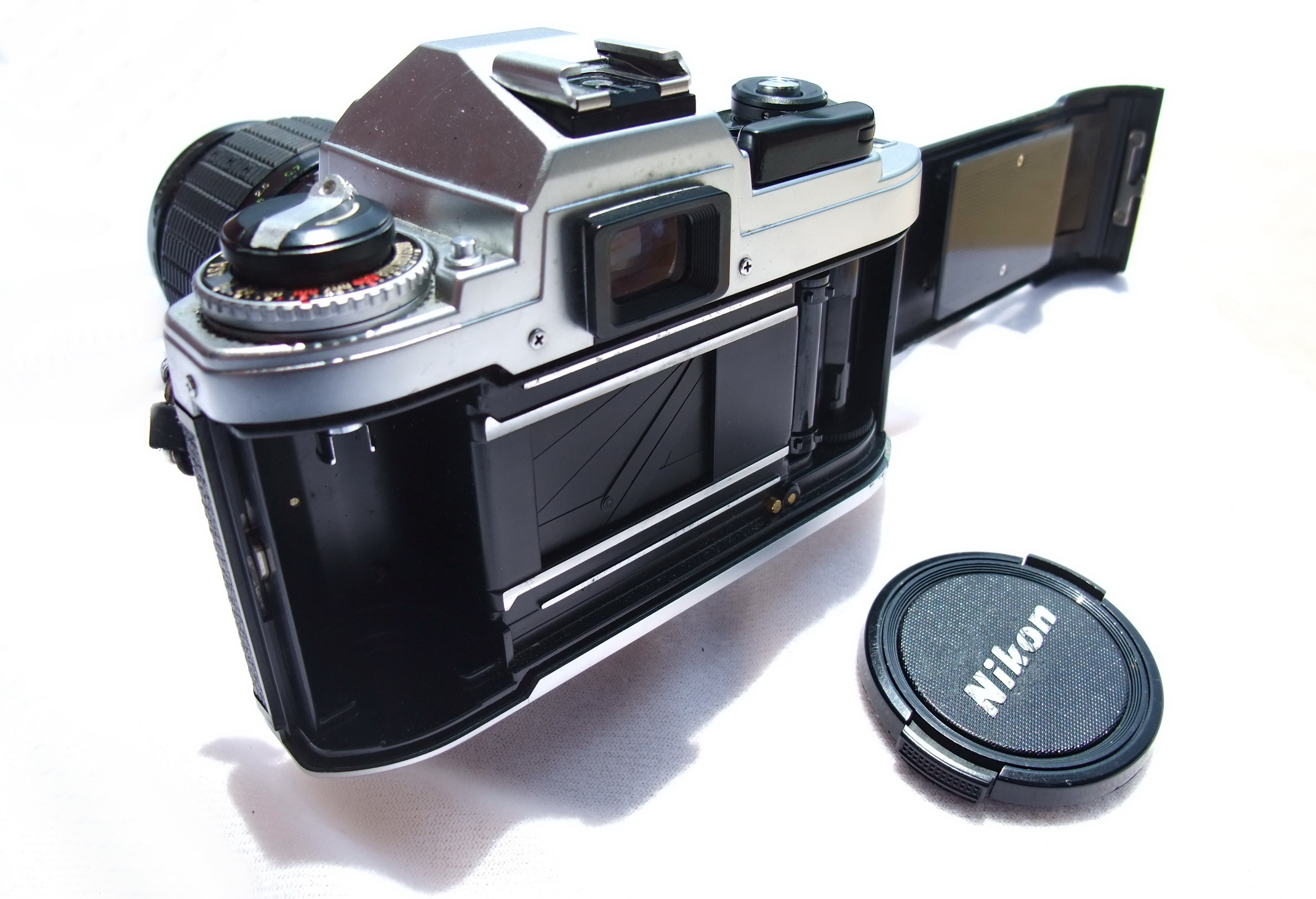
Nikon FG with the camera back opened

=== Body Construction ===
- Copper silumin aluminum alloy body
- Polycarbonate exterior
- Leatherette (synthetic) covering
- Metal lens mount

=== Exposure Control and Metering ===
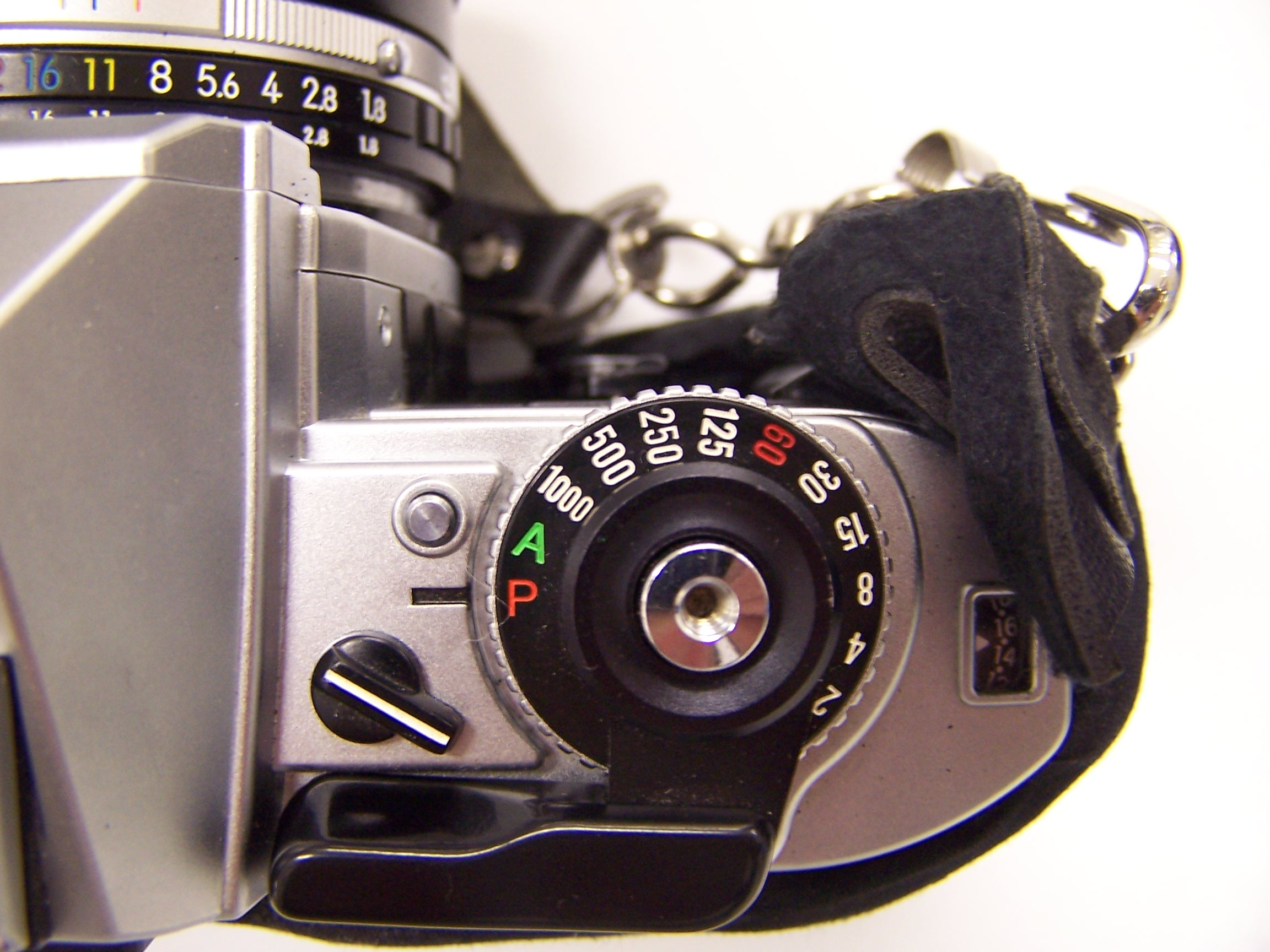
Nikon FG exposure mode and shutter speed dial

The FG's metering system is controlled by a micro-computer which measures center-weighted brightness, using a sensitive silicon photodiode (SPD) sensor. The metering system performs 'instant stop down metering', where the meter reading is taken after the lens is stopped down but before the mirror flips up and the shutter opens.

In 'P' (Programmed AE) mode, the camera calculates stepless aperture (f/stop) and stepless shutter speed using pre-programmed values.

In 'A' (Aperture Priority AE) mode, the camera calculates a stepless shutter speed for a given user-selected aperture value.

In 'M' (Manual Exposure Control) mode, the user selects both aperture and shutter speed, and the metering system provides a suggested shutter speed (indicated in the viewfinder) for the selected aperture.

=== Viewfinder ===
The viewfinder consists of a fixed, eye-level pentaprism providing a magnification of 0.84x, with a 50 mm lens set at infinity and approximately 92% frame coverage.

The focusing screen is a standard Nikon 'K-type' screen with:

- clear-matte/Fresnel field
- central split-image rangefinder spot
- microprism collar and 12 mm-diameter reference circle (indicates center-weighted metering area).

Displayed on the right side of the viewfinder are:

- A vertical shutter speed scale with LEDs to indicate both the user selected and camera suggested shutter speed (in 'M' mode) and the value selected ('P' and 'A' modes) by the camera's metering system.
- Triangular warning LEDs at the top and bottom of the shutter speed scale, to indicate over- or under-exposure.
- A flash ready-light opposite a thunderbolt symbol at the bottom of the shutter speed.

=== Flash Exposure Control ===
The FG was also Nippon Kogaku's first amateur level SLR to have through-the-lens (TTL) off-the-film (OTF) electronic flash automation. This technology was first introduced with the Olympus OM-2 in 1976. and was also used previously in the Nikon F3 introduced in 1980. TTL OTF flash exposure control is more precise than previous methods as it measures the flash exposure at the film plane rather than at the flash itself. Correct flash exposure is achieved via an SPD cell at the base of the mirror box, which measures light reflected back from the film plane.

The FG can only connect to flashes via the hot shoe connection, as it lacks a PC sync socket. Flashes which do not have a hot shoe can be used with a hot shoe-sync cord adapter.

== Lens Compatibility ==
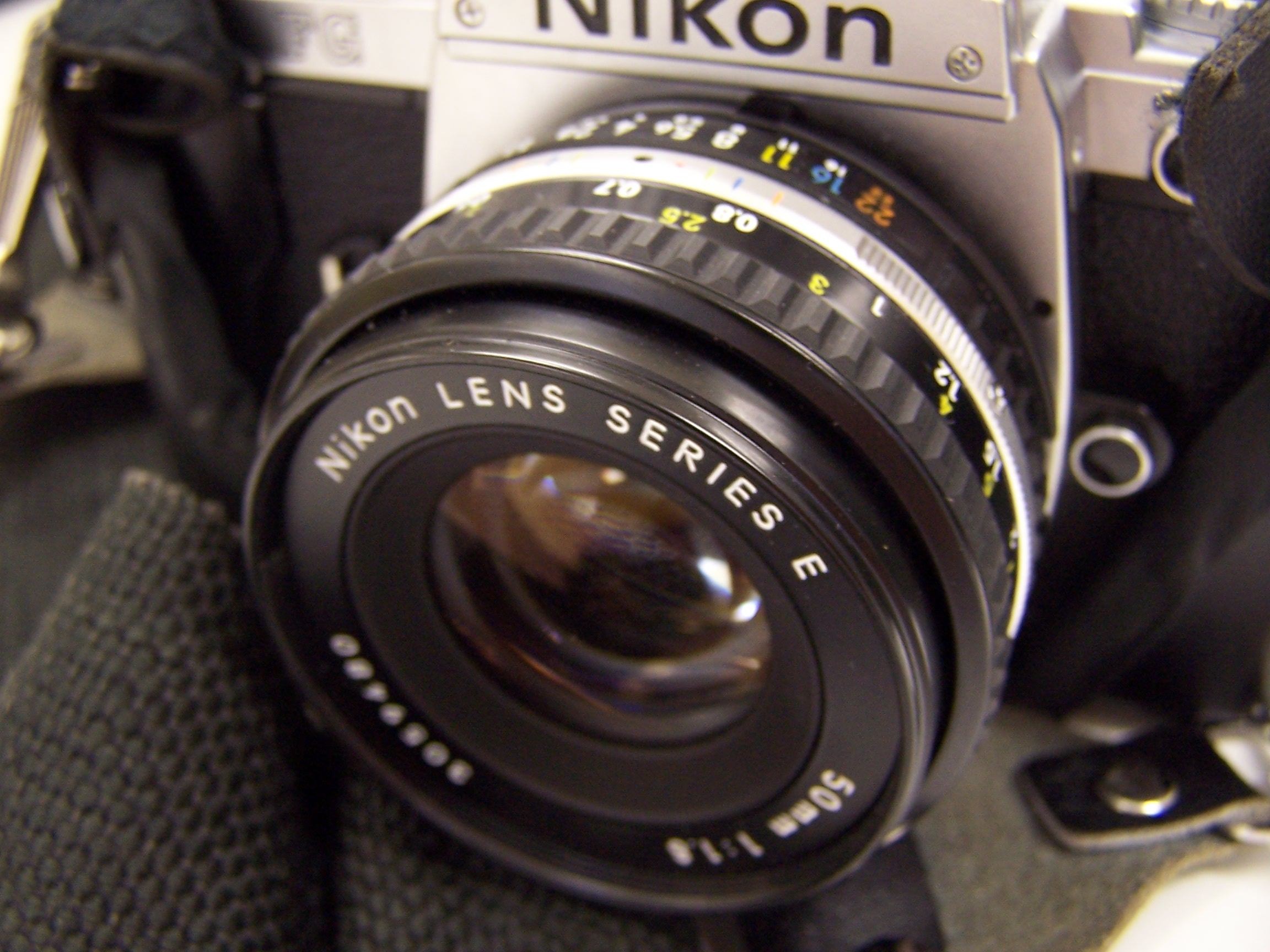
Nikon FG and series E 50mm lens

Nikon lenses are compatible with the FG as follows:

- The FG requires Automatic Indexing (AI) Nikkor lenses for P and A modes to function. Lenses with AI capability include AI and AI-s type Nikkor lenses and Nikon Series E Lenses.
- The following Non-AI and AI-converted lenses are not usable with the Nikon FG:
  - Non-AI (requires AI modification)
  - AI-converted 55mm/1.2 ser.# 184711–400000
  - AI-converted 28mm/3.5 ser.# 625611–999999
  - AI-converted 35mm/1.4 ser.# 385001–400000
  - Fisheye 6mm/5.6 (requires mirror lock-up)
  - Fisheye 10mm/5.6 OP (requires mirror lock-up)
  - PC Nikkor 28mm/4 below ser.# 180900
  - PC Nikkor 35mm/2.8 ser.# 851001–906200
  - Reflex Nikkor 1000mm/11 ser. # below 1430000
  - Reflex Nikkor 2000mm/11 ser. # below 200311
  - Zoom Nikkor 200-600mm/9.5 ser. # below 301922
  - Zoom Nikkor ED 180-600mm/8 ser. # below 174180
  - Zoom Nikkor ED 360-1200mm/11 ser. # below 17412
  - Focusing unit AU-1
- G-type lenses lack an aperture ring and do not couple with the indexing ring on the FG. The P mode does not function. The A mode will suggest a shutter speed for the available light. The aperture can be stopped down by slightly unscrewing the lens.
- Autofocus Nikkor lenses will mount correctly but autofocus does not function. Vibration reduction (if fitted) does not function.
- DX Nikkor lenses will mount correctly, but the reduced image circle does not cover the full 35mm film frame, so there will be more or less strong vignetting, depending on the model. All DX lenses are G-type or E-type lenses, so P and A modes will not be available.
- IX (APS format) lenses extend too far into the camera and may cause damage. The reduced image circle does not cover the full 35mm film frame

== Accessories ==
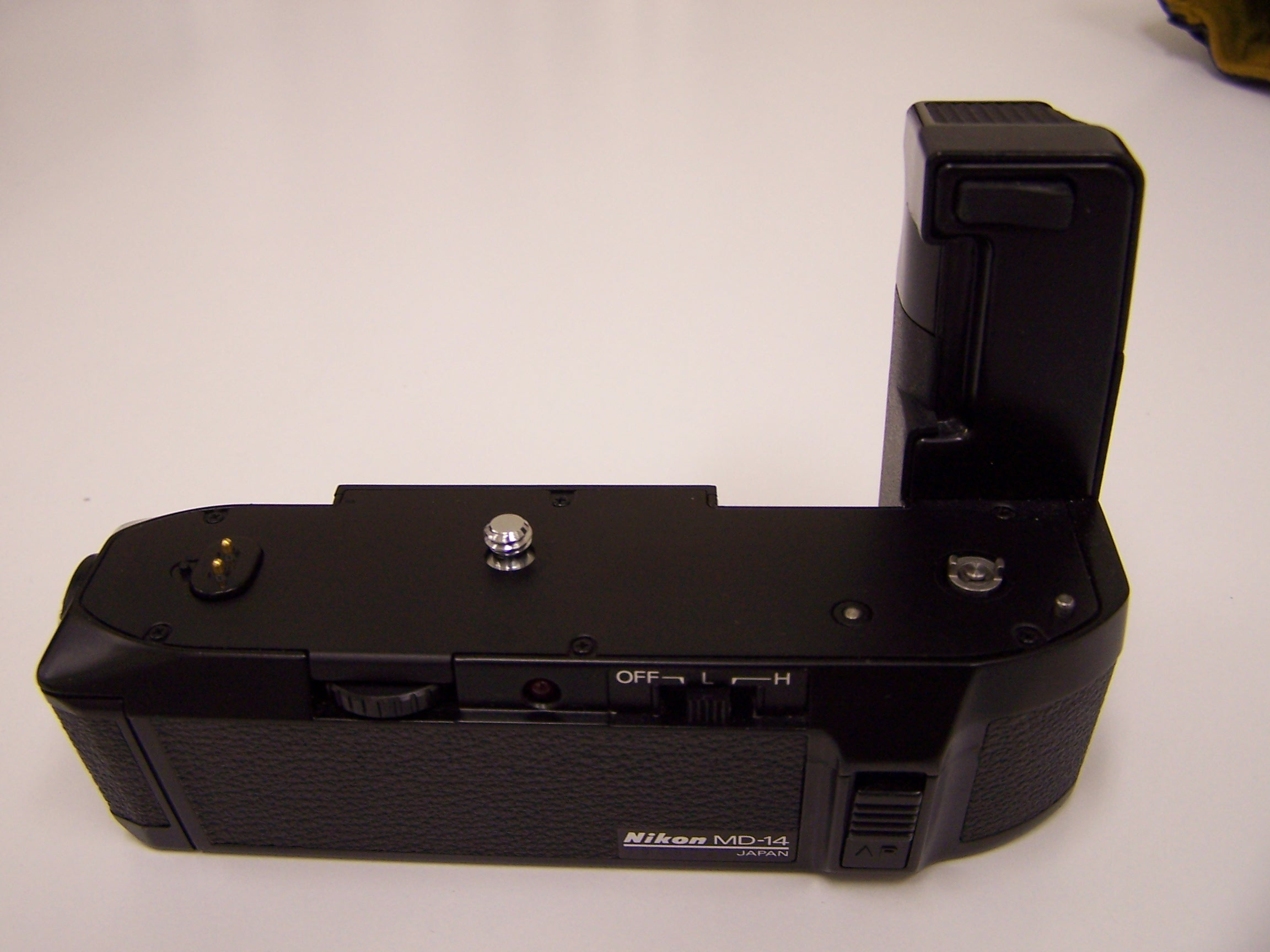
MD-14 motor drive

=== Motor Drives ===
The motor drives that are compatible with the FG are shown in the following table:

	Automatic film advance	Additional hand grip	Usable shutter speed	Shutter release	Number of 36 exp. rolls	Power source	Dimensions WxHxD	Weight
Nikon MD-14	3.2 fps (high); 2 fps (low)	Yes	1 s to 1/1000 s	Camera's shutter release button	More than 50	Eight 1.5 V AA-type batteries	140×91.5×64 mm (5.51×3.60×2.52 in) (including grip)	Approx. 350 g (excluding batteries)
Nikon MD-E	2 fps	No	1 s to 1/1000 s	Camera's shutter release button	More than 50	Six 1.5 V AAA-type batteries	133×82×46 mm (5.2×3.2×1.8 in) (including grip)	Approx. 185 g (excluding batteries)

=== MF-15 databack ===
The Nikon MF-15 is an optional quartz databack released exclusively for the FG. It replaces the standard film door of the camera and provides:

- Sequential frame count.
- Sequential frame numbering.
- Time or date stamping on the film.

=== Nikon Speedlights ===
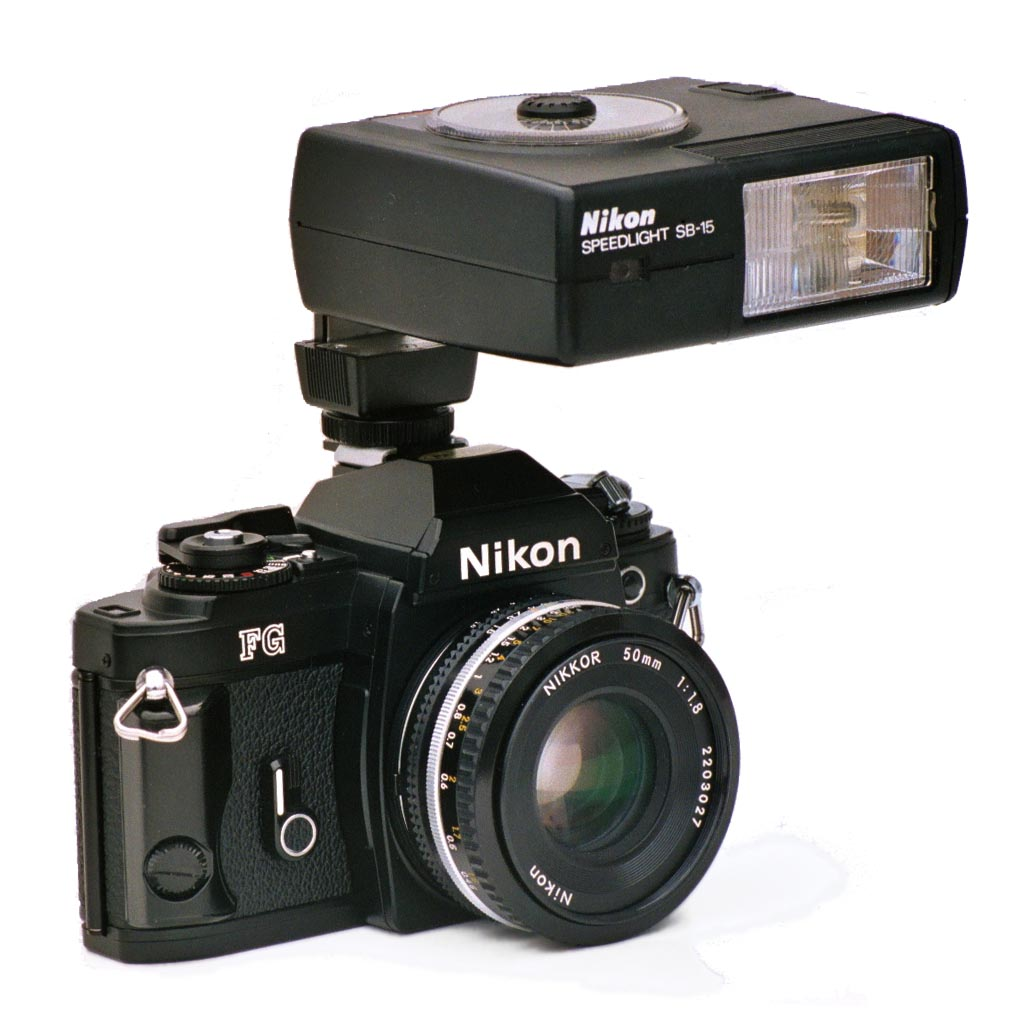
Nikon FG with SB-15 speedlight

The FG can be used with any dedicated Nikon speedlights (flashes) which support TTL flash exposure, and any non-dedicated flash units in either automatic or manual modes.

Dedicated, hot shoe mounted Nikon speedlights available during the time the FG was manufactured were the SB-E, SB-15, SB-16B, SB-18 and SB-19.

== Background and design history ==
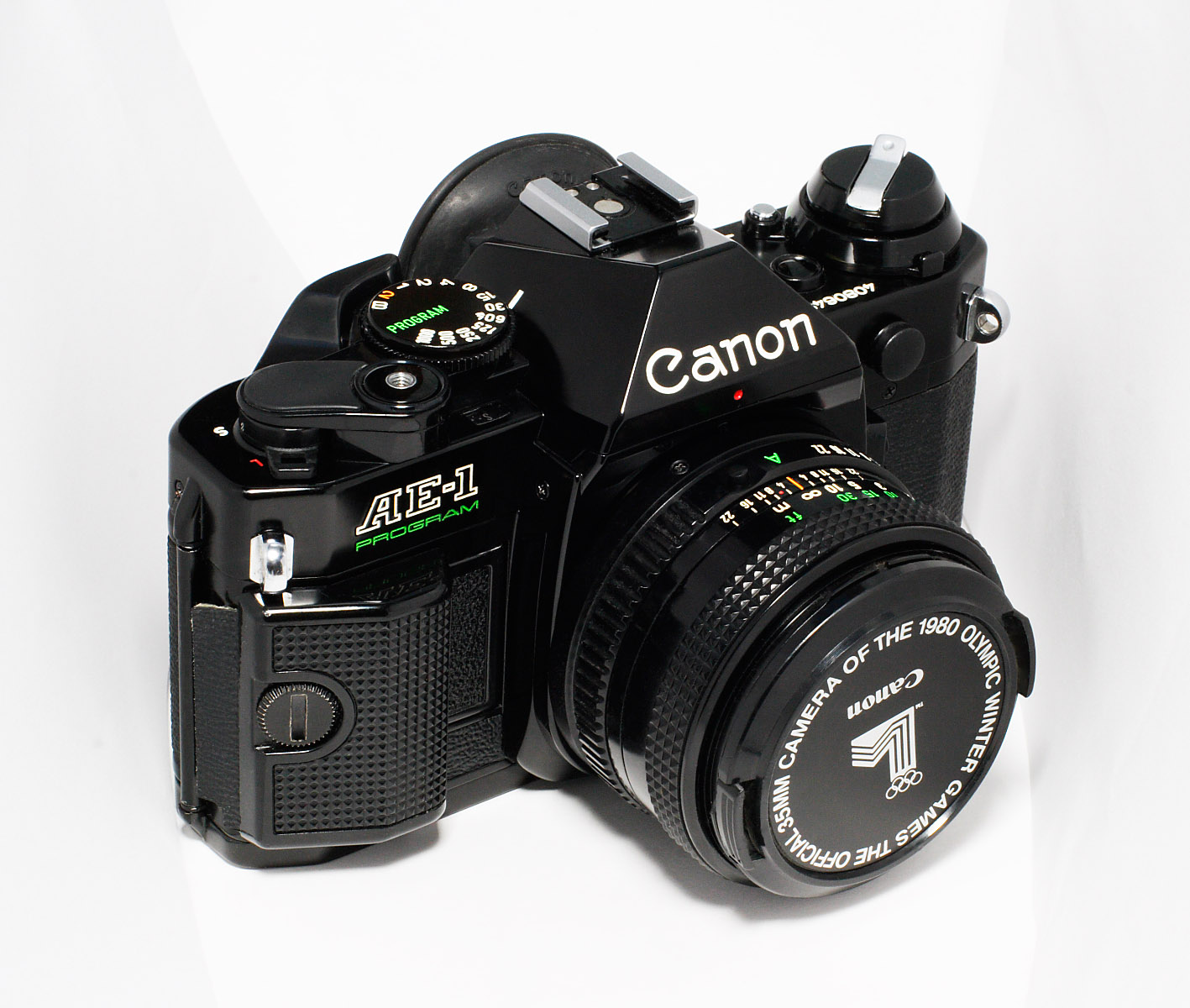
Canon AE-1 Program in black finish

The 1970s and 1980s were an era of intense competition between the major SLR brands: Nikon, Canon, Minolta, Pentax and Olympus. This was in part a result of rapid advances in electronics at the time, which allowed new cameras to be released more frequently and with more automated features than had been possible previously.

Between c. 1975 to 1985, there was a shift away from heavy all-metal manual mechanical camera bodies to much more compact bodies with integrated circuit (IC) electronic automation. As a result of the manufacturing climate of the time, the EM and subsequent FG and FG-20 were released with much lower price points, and more compact and user-friendly bodies than previous Nikons, to appeal to the amateur photographer market.

The FG was intended to improve on the shortcomings of the EM (which had no manual override) and to compete with other programmed SLRs of the time, such as the Canon AE-1 Program (released 1981) the Minolta X-700 (released 1981) or the Pentax Super Program (in the USA/Canada; Super-A, in the rest of the world; 1983).

=== Market Reception ===
The FG was well received by many amateur photographers, but was criticised by others due to the lower build-quality and reliability when compared to other Nikons of the same era. The FG has known reliability issues, particularly with its shutter components and ICs.

== Compared to Nikon EM and FG-20 ==
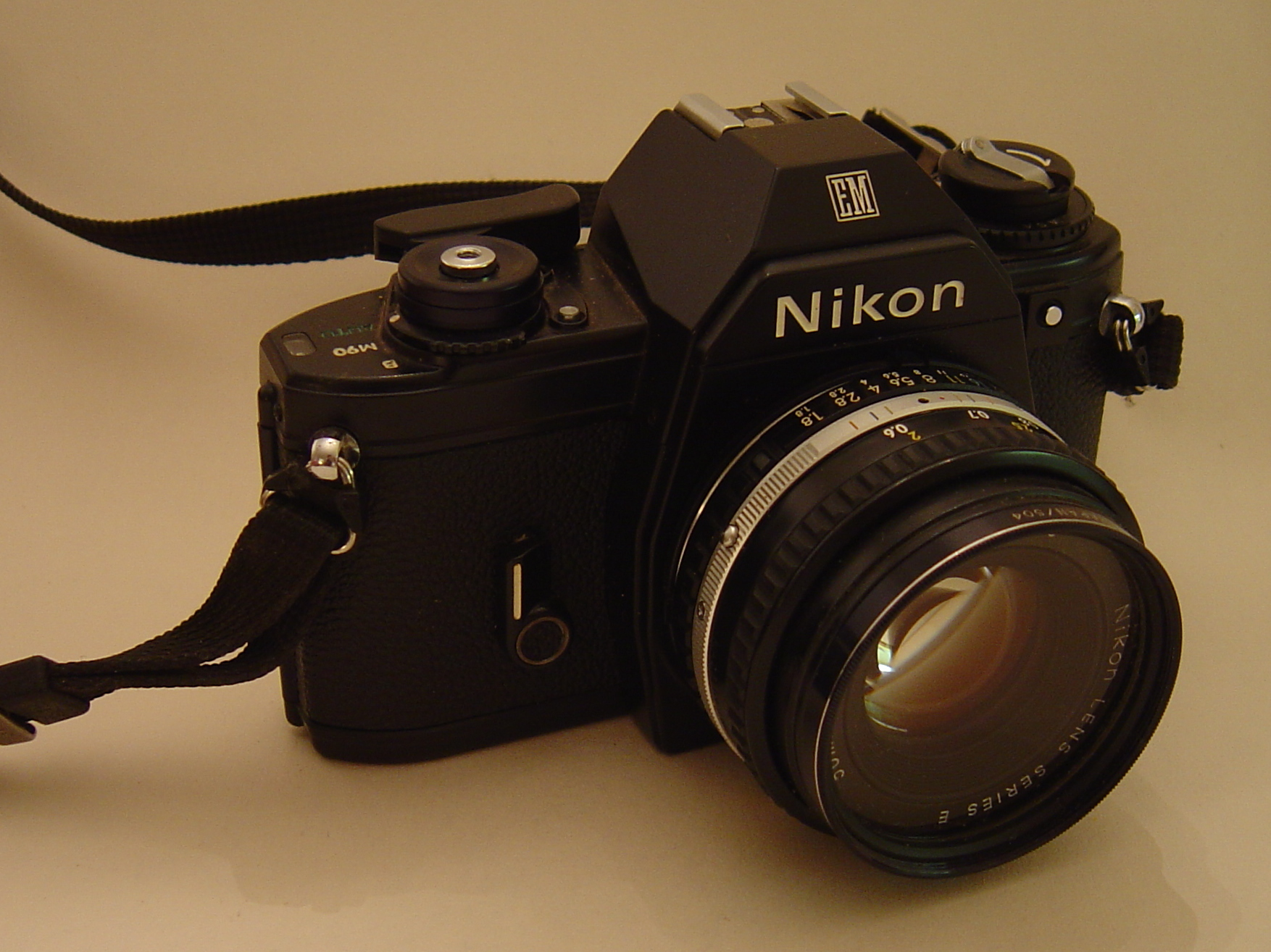
Nikon EM

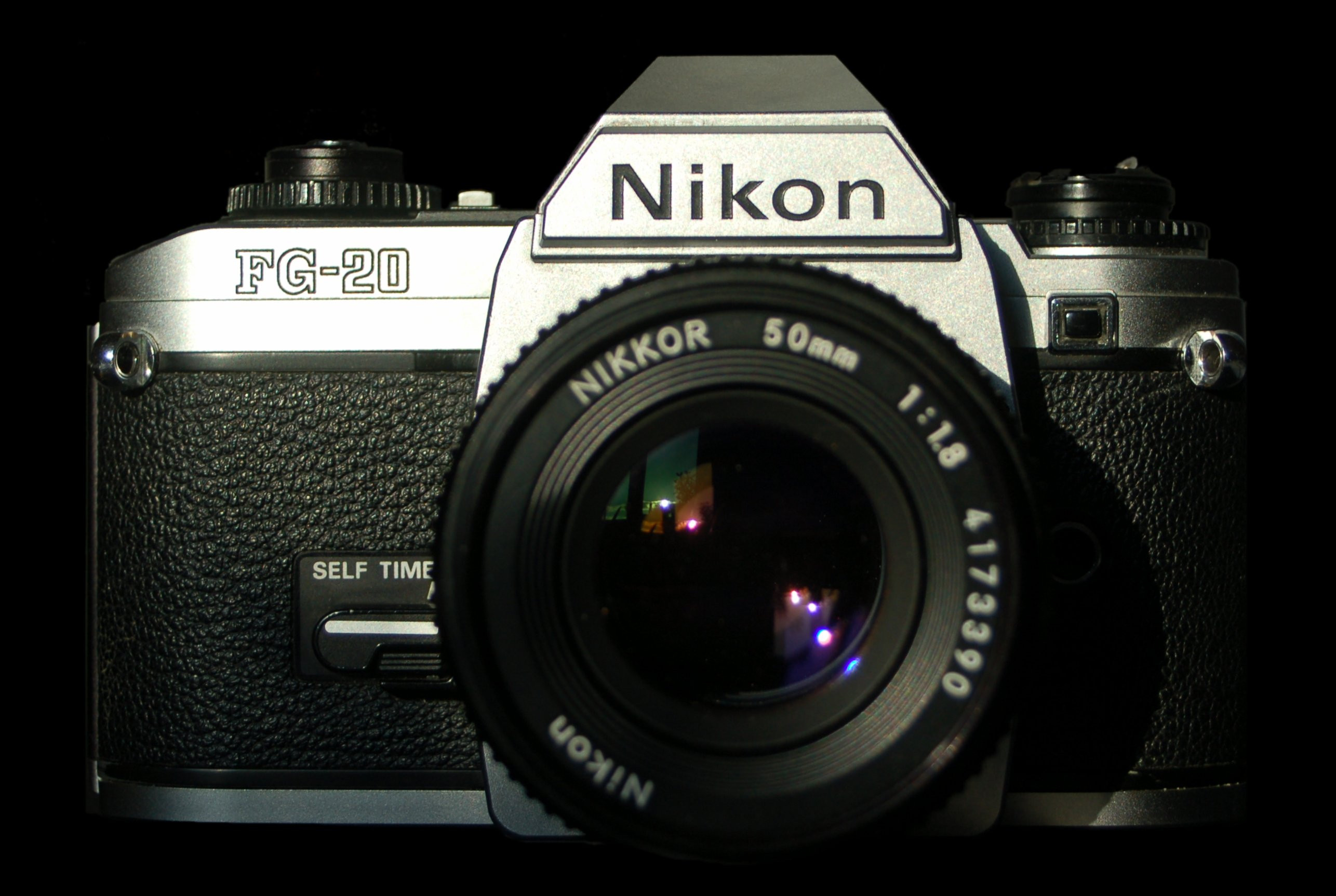
Nikon FG-20

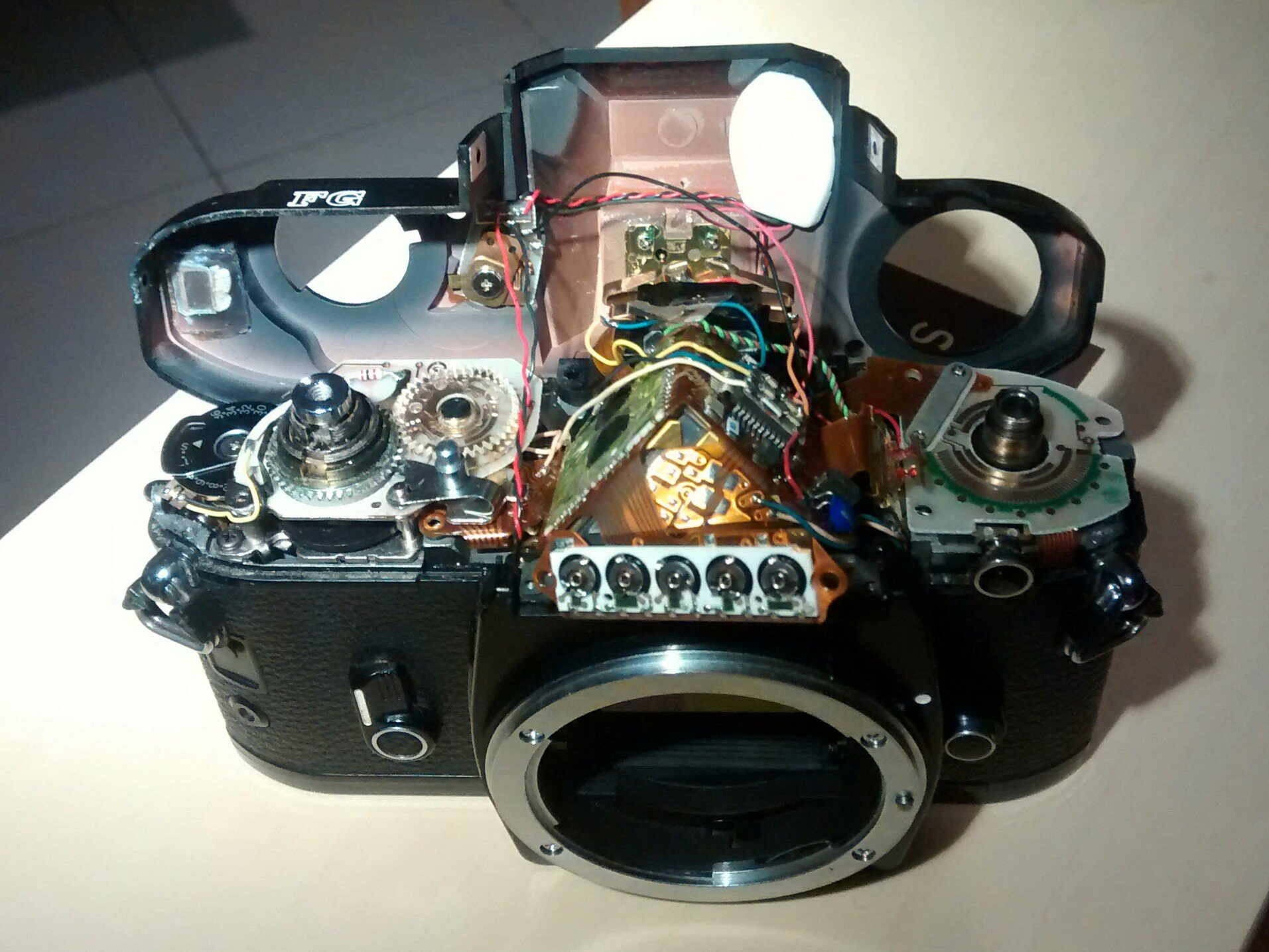
Nikon FG interior

The major improvements of the FG compared to the EM were improved exterior cosmetics, internal printed circuit electronics, the addition of the manual exposure and programmed autoexposure modes, and provision for TTL flash automation.

The FG-20 is a simplified version of the Nikon FG, with no Programmed AE mode, no TTL OTF flash, and no exposure control, but retaining Aperture Priority AE, and manual and auto flash exposure control.

Class	1950s					1960s										1970s										1980s										1990s										2000s										2020s			
Class	55	56	57	58	59	60	61	62	63	64	65	66	67	68	69	70	71	72	73	74	75	76	77	78	79	80	81	82	83	84	85	86	87	88	89	90	91	92	93	94	95	96	97	98	99	00	01	02	03	04	05	06	07	08	09	...	20	21	22
Professional					F																					F3																																	
Professional																	F2												F3AF					F4								F5								F6									
High-end																													FA					F-801 (N8008)/ F-801s (N8008s)				F90 (N90)		F90X (N90s)					F100														
Mid-range																																F-501 (N2020)				F-601 (N6006)				F70 (N70)						F80 (N80)													
Mid-range																		EL / EL2 /ELW						FE					FE2							F-601M (N6000)				F70 (N70)						F80 (N80)													
Mid-range											FT		FTn/ FT2/ FT3										FM					FM2/FM2n																			FM3A												
Mid-range											FS												FM					FM2/FM2n																			FM3A												
Entry-level																																																											
Entry-level																																										Pronea S																	
Entry-level																																									Pronea 600i/6i																		
Entry-level								Nikkorex F / Nikkor J																	EM			FG			F-301 (N2000)				F-401s (N4004s)					F50 (N50)							F65 (N65 / U)		F75 (N75 / U2)										
Entry-level						35		35 II		Auto 35																				FG-20			F-401 (N4004)				F-401x (N5005)								F60 (N60)			F55 (N55)											
Entry-level									Zoom 35																																FM10 / FE10																		
Class	55	56	57	58	59	60	61	62	63	64	65	66	67	68	69	70	71	72	73	74	75	76	77	78	79	80	81	82	83	84	85	86	87	88	89	90	91	92	93	94	95	96	97	98	99	00	01	02	03	04	05	06	07	08	09	...	20	21	22
Class	1950s					1960s										1970s										1980s										1990s										2000s										2020s			
