= Frequency scanning interferometry =

Absolute distance measurement technique

Frequency scanning interferometry (FSI) is an absolute distance measurement technique, for measuring the distance between a pair of points, along a line-of-sight. The power of the FSI technique lies in its ability to make many such distance measurements, simultaneously.

For each distance to be measured, a measurement interferometer is built using optical components placed at each end of a line-of-sight. The optical path of each measurement interferometer is compared to the optical path in a reference interferometer, by scanning the frequency of a laser (connected to all interferometers in the system) and counting fringe cycles produced in the return signals from each interferometer.

The length of each measurement interferometer is given in units of reference length by the ratio of measurement interferometer to reference interferometer fringes.

To give an example: A frequency scan might produce 100 fringe cycles in the measurement interferometer and 50 in the reference interferometer. The measured interferometer is therefore twice the length of reference interferometer, to first order (ignoring systematic errors - see below).

== Reference interferometer precautions ==
A typical reference interferometer is held at a stable length in a controlled environment, to reduce the dominant systematic errors which arise from changes in optical path which occur during the laser frequency scan.

== Uses ==
The great strength of the FSI technique is the ability to simultaneously compare any number of "measurement" interferometers to the same reference length. This has great benefit in a shape measurement system.

An FSI system is being used to monitor shape changes of the semiconductor tracker (SCT) on the ATLAS detector at CERN.

== Precision ==
The measurement sensitivity depends on how rapidly the laser is tuned and how well systematic errors are controlled. Currently precisions of a few nm over a 6m path are possible in evacuated interferometers. In a system built for the ATLAS experiment a target of 1 micrometre precision over distances of 1 m is expected to be easily achieved.
