= Mortality Medical Data System =

Government database for entry of death-related information

The Mortality Medical Data System (MMDS) is used to automate the entry, classification, and retrieval of cause-of-death information reported on death certificates throughout the United States and in many other countries. The National Center for Health Statistics (NCHS) began the system's development in 1967.

The system has facilitated the standardization of mortality information within the United States, and ACME has become the de facto international standard for the automated selection of the underlying cause of death from multiple conditions listed on a death certificate.

== System components ==
The MMDS system consists of the following components, and is itself part of the National Vital Statistics System.

=== MICAR ===
There are two Mortality Medical Indexing, Classification, and Retrieval components.

- SuperMICAR automates the MICAR data entry process. This program is designed as an enhancement of the earlier PC-MICAR Data Entry program. Super-MICAR is designed to automatically encode cause-of-death data into numeric entity reference numbers.
- MICAR200 automates the multiple cause coding rules and assigns International Statistical Classification of Diseases and Related Health Problems (ICD) codes to each numeric entity reference number.

=== ACME ===
The Automated Classification of Medical Entities program automates the underlying cause-of-death coding rules. The input to ACME is the multiple cause-of-death codes (ICD) assigned to each entity (e.g., disease condition, accident, or injury) listed on cause-of-death certifications, preserving the location and order as reported by the certifier. ACME then applies the World Health Organization (WHO) rules to the ICD codes and selects an underlying cause of death. ACME has become the de facto international standard for the automated selection of the underlying cause of death.

=== TRANSAX ===
The TRANSlation of Axis program converts the ACME output data into fixed format and translates the data into a more desirable statistical form using the linkage provisions of the ICD. TRANSAX creates the data necessary for person-based tabulations by translating the axis of classification from an entity basis to a record basis.

== See also ==
- Vital statistics
- Nosology
- International Statistical Classification of Diseases and Related Health Problems
