= Agency for Medicinal Products and Medical Devices of the Republic of Slovenia =

Regulatory agency of the Republic of Slovenia

JAZMP logo

Agency for Medicinal Products and Medical Devices of the Republic of Slovenia (Slovene: Javna agencija Republike Slovenije za zdravila in medicinske pripomočke; acronym: JAZMP) is a regulatory agency of the Republic of Slovenia competent for medicinal products and medical devices. It was created on 1 January 2007 through the merger of the Agency for Medicinal Products and Medical Devices (Agencija RS za zdravila in medicinske pripomočke, ARSZMP) and the Institute for Pharmacy and Testing of Medicinal Products – Ljubljana (Zavod za farmacijo in preizkušanje zdravil – Ljubljana, ZAF), and as the new entity took over all the rights and obligations of both its predecessors. It is an independent regulatory body competent for medicinal products and medical devices in the fields of human medicine and veterinary medicine, its purpose being protection of public health in the fields of medicinal products and medical devices.

== See also ==
- Formularium Slovenicum
