= Formularium Slovenicum =

Formularium Slovenicum

Formularium Slovenicum is Slovenian addendum to the European Pharmacopoeia. It promotes Slovenian pharmaceutical terminology and the regulations affecting the field of pharmacy in Slovenia. It has been regularly published by the Agency for Medicinal Products and Medical Devices of the Republic of Slovenia.

Slovenia does not have its own pharmacopoeia, i.e. a collection of monographs and other provisions containing legally binding regulations regarding the development, manufacture, and quality assessment of medicinal products and their ingredients as well as other information on medicinal products and their use. Since 1997, European Pharmacopoeia has been in force in the Republic of Slovenia. The alignment of provisions of the national law in the field of medicinal products and regulations at the level of the European Pharmacopoeia brought forward the need for Slovenian addendum to the European Pharmacopoeia. The committee for drafting the national addendum at the Office for Medicinal Products of the Slovenian Ministry of Health issued in June 1998 the first edition of Formularium Slovenicum. Several amendments and updated editions have followed, though the work of the committee preparing Formularium Slovenicum was interrupted between 2013 and 2018.

Formularium Slovenicum supplements European Pharmacopoeia standards and provides translations of titles, complete translations of the main monographs or their individual parts, and translations of general chapters. The chapter National monographs comprises interesting and useful monographs for Slovenian pharmacy practice that the European Pharmacopoeia does not include. It also includes the chapter Standard Terms for Pharrmaceutical Forms, Methods of Administration, and Containers. Formularium Slovenicum has an important role in the drafting, development, and promotion of Slovenian pharmaceutical terms.

== Editions ==
The first edition has been followed by numerous amendments and updated editions:

- 1st edition – June 1998, six amendments
- 2nd edition – 2005, five amendments
- 3rd edition – 2011, two amendments
- 4th edition – August 2018, one amendment (solely online)
- 5th edition – August 2020 (solely online)
