= Full Service Network (Pennsylvania) =

- Industry: Internet and phone services
- Founded: 1989
- Founder: David E. Schwencke
- Area served: Western Pennsylvania
- Website: fullservicenetwork.com

Full Service Network is a Western Pennsylvania-based competitive local exchange carrier (CLEC) providing services which include high-speed internet and broadband phone service. It was founded in 1989 by University of Pittsburgh student David E. Schwencke.

== History ==
Founded in 1989 as a software company, Full Service Network entered the telecommunications landscape in the early 1990s. Throughout that decade, as land line phone services became competitive, FSN focused mostly on serving the commercial market of small to mid-size businesses. In 1998, FSN entered the residential market, gaining more than ten thousand residential subscribers in western Pennsylvania, as well as other customers across twenty-three states centered around Western Pennsylvania, Ohio, and West Virginia.

Currently employing roughly eighty-five staff, the company is based at the US Steel Tower in downtown Pittsburgh. In 2012, Full Service Network was recognized by the Pittsburgh Post-Gazette as one of Pittsburgh's Top Work Places; it was then recognized again in 2014, 2015 and 2016 as one of the city's top employers. In 2013 and 2025, the Pittsburgh Business Times also awarded FSN with a "Best Places to Work in Western Pennsylvania" honor.

The company no longer provides residential phone and internet to new customers.
