= For Sale =

For Sale may refer to:

== Film ==
- For Sale (1918 film), a silent film starring Gladys Hulette and Creighton Hale
- For Sale (1924 film), a silent film starring Vera Reynolds
- For Sale (1998 film), a French drama film

== Music ==
- Beatles for Sale, 1964
- For Sale (Fool's Garden album), 2000
- For Sale (Right Said Fred album), 2006
- For Sale (Włochaty album), 1991
- For Sale... (EP), an EP by Say Anything
- For Sale? (Interlude), on To Pimp a Butterfly by Kendrick Lamar, 2015

== See also ==
- For sale by owner
- "For sale: baby shoes, never worn"
- Sale (disambiguation)
- Sales
