= Nikkormat =

Camera brand

Nikomat
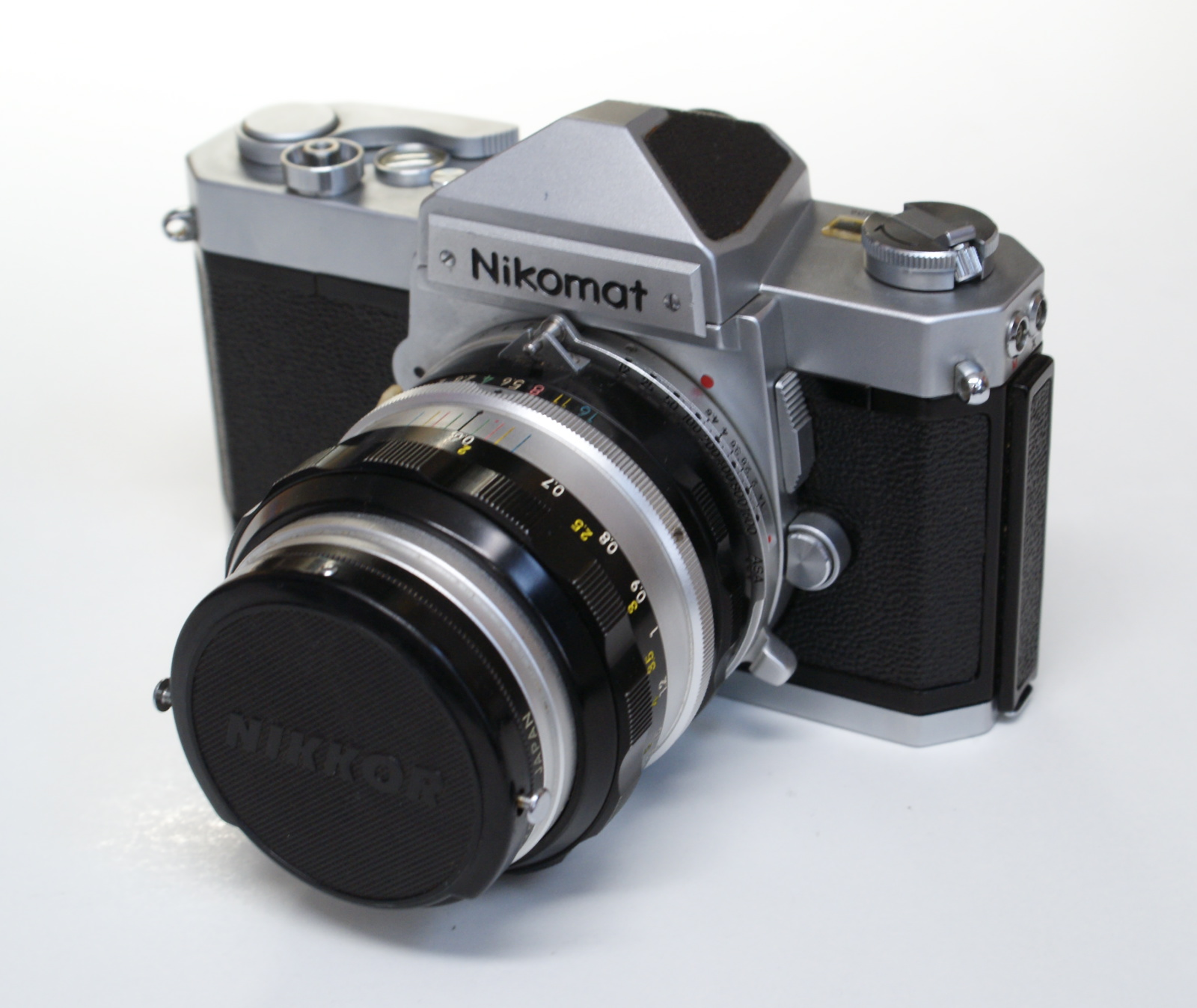
- Nikomat FT

Overview
- Type: 35mm SLR camera
- Released: 1965
- Production: 1965-1978; 14 years

Lens
- Lens mount: Nikon F-mount

Focusing
- Focus: manual

Exposure/metering
- Exposure: Manual or automatic

Flash
- Flash: hot shoe

Nikkormat (Nikomat in Japan) was a brand of cameras produced by the Japanese optics company Nippon Kogaku K. K., as a consumer version of the professional Nikon brand. Nikkormat cameras, produced from 1965 until 1978, were simpler and more affordable than Nikon-branded cameras, but accepted the same lenses as the Nikon F series cameras.

== Note on the Nikkormat metering system ==
The light meter indicates current whose value depends on the amount of light, and three user settings: aperture, shutter speed, and film sensitivity (film speed). In many cameras the three user settings each have a separate resistor with a moving contact. In the Nikkormat there is only a single resistor and a single moving contact: the resistor is on one ring and the contact on another of the concentric rings around the lens mount. The film sensitivity (speed) and the shutter speed combine their values on one ring, while the aperture determines the relative position of the second ring. Using only one moving contact presumably led to higher reliability. It also explains why all settings are on the mount rings.

== The Nikkormat F-series ==
=== Nikkormat FT ===
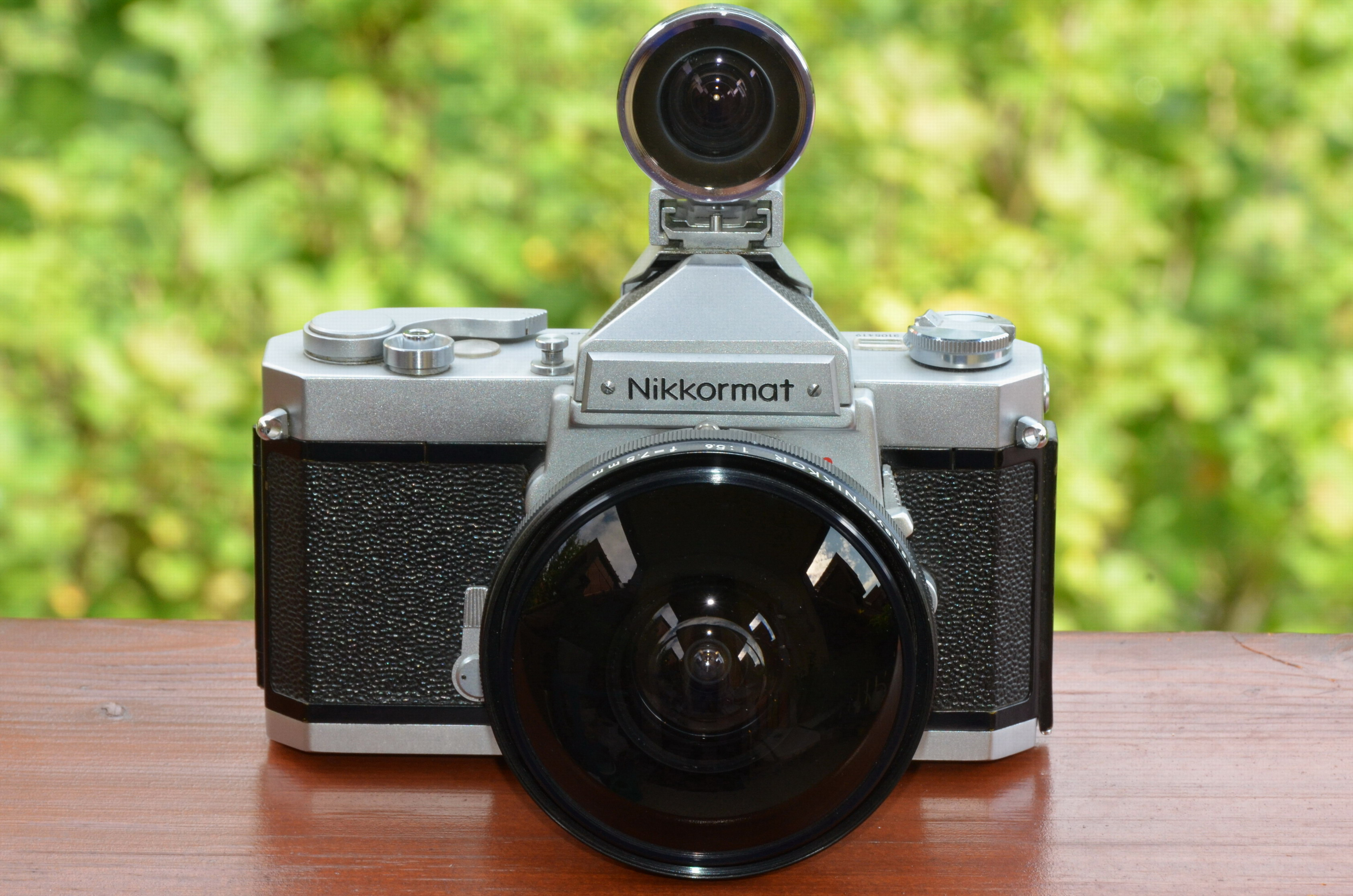
Nikkormat FT SLR camera with Fisheye-NIKKOR 1:5,6 f=7,5mm and finder

The Nikkormat FT was an all-metal, mechanically (springs, gears, levers) controlled, manual focus SLR with match-needle exposure control, manufactured in Japan from 1965 to 1967. It was available in two colors: black with chrome trim and all black. The unmetered version was designated "Nikkormat FS."

The FT had dimensions of 95 mm height, 146 mm width, 54 mm depth and 745 g weight. This was larger and heavier than most competing amateur level SLRs of the mid-1960s, such as the Asahi (Honeywell in the USA) Pentax Spotmatic of 1964, but the quality of the internal components gave the FT strength and durability.

The FT used a metal-bladed, vertical travel, focal plane shutter with a speed range of 1 to 1/1000 second plus Bulb and flash X-sync of 1/125th second. The Nikkormat F-series had a shutter speed ring concentric with the lens mount, unlike Nippon Kogaku's other manual focus SLRs with a top mounted shutter speed dial.

The FT's exposure control system was a "center-the-needle" system using a galvanometer needle pointer moving vertically at the lower right side of the viewfinder to indicate the readings of the built-in, open aperture, TTL, full-scene averaging, cadmium sulfide (CdS) light meter versus the actual camera settings. The photographer would adjust the shutter speed to freeze or blur motion and/or the lens aperture f-stop to control depth of field (focus) until the needle was centered between two pincer-like brackets. The needle array was duplicated in a window next to the top-mounted film rewind crank to allow exposure control without looking through the viewfinder. The meter was turned on by pulling the film wind lever out to the standby ready position and turned off by pushing it back flush against the camera.

This was very advanced in 1965 and proved to be remarkably long-lived. Nippon Kogaku used it for all versions of the Nikkormat FT with incremental improvements. The Nikon FM, FM2 and FM2N of the succeeding Nikon compact F-series SLRs used an improved viewfinder only, center-the-LED system until 2001.

The FT's viewfinder also had a fixed focusing screen with Nippon Kogaku's then standard central 4 mm microprism focusing aid plus 12 mm matte focusing surface.

The Nikkormat FT accepted all lenses with the Nikon F bayonet mount (introduced in 1959 on the Nikon F camera) and a "meter coupling shoe" (or prong, informally called "rabbit ears"). The FT had a mirror lockup allowing its use with some specialised lenses for which an auxiliary viewfinder was provided.

The FT was Nippon Kogaku's first SLR with a built-in TTL light meter. As such, Nippon Kogaku could not find a way to automatically synchronize their Nikkor Auto lenses' aperture information with the FT body. Therefore, mounting lenses required a special preparatory procedure. First, the lens' maximum aperture (smallest f-stop number) must be set against the film speed scale on the FT's shutter speed ring. Then, the "meter coupling pin" on the ring surrounding the FT's lens mount flange must pushed all the way to the right and the lens' aperture ring must be preset to f/5.6 to line up the "meter coupling shoe" with the pin for mounting. Note that the lens maximum aperture had to be reset every time the lens was changed. This was very inconvenient compared to some other SLRs of the 1960s.

Note that modern AF Nikkor autofocusing lenses (introduced 1986) do not have a meter coupling shoe, but all non-G AF lenses have two pilot holes to retrofit the coupling shoe, making them 100% compatible with all Nikon F-mount cameras. Although most AF Nikkor lenses will mount and manually focus on the FT, the combination cannot provide open aperture metering; only stop down metering. Nikon's most recent 35 mm film SLR lenses, the AF Nikkor G type (2000) lacking an aperture control ring; and the AF Nikkor DX type (2003) with image circles sized for Nikon's digital SLRs will mount, but will not function properly at all.

The FT also had two PC terminals to synchronize with flash units: an M-sync to all speeds for M and FP type (1/60 second for MF type) flashbulbs and an X-sync to 1/125th second for electronic flashes using guide number manual exposure control. However, the FT did not have a built-in accessory shoe to mount flash units. The "Nikkormat accessory shoe" must be screwed to the top of the pentaprism cover via the eyepiece first. Note that this shoe only mounts the flash. A PC cord must still be plugged into the appropriate PC terminal. This was normal for most SLRs of the 1960s.

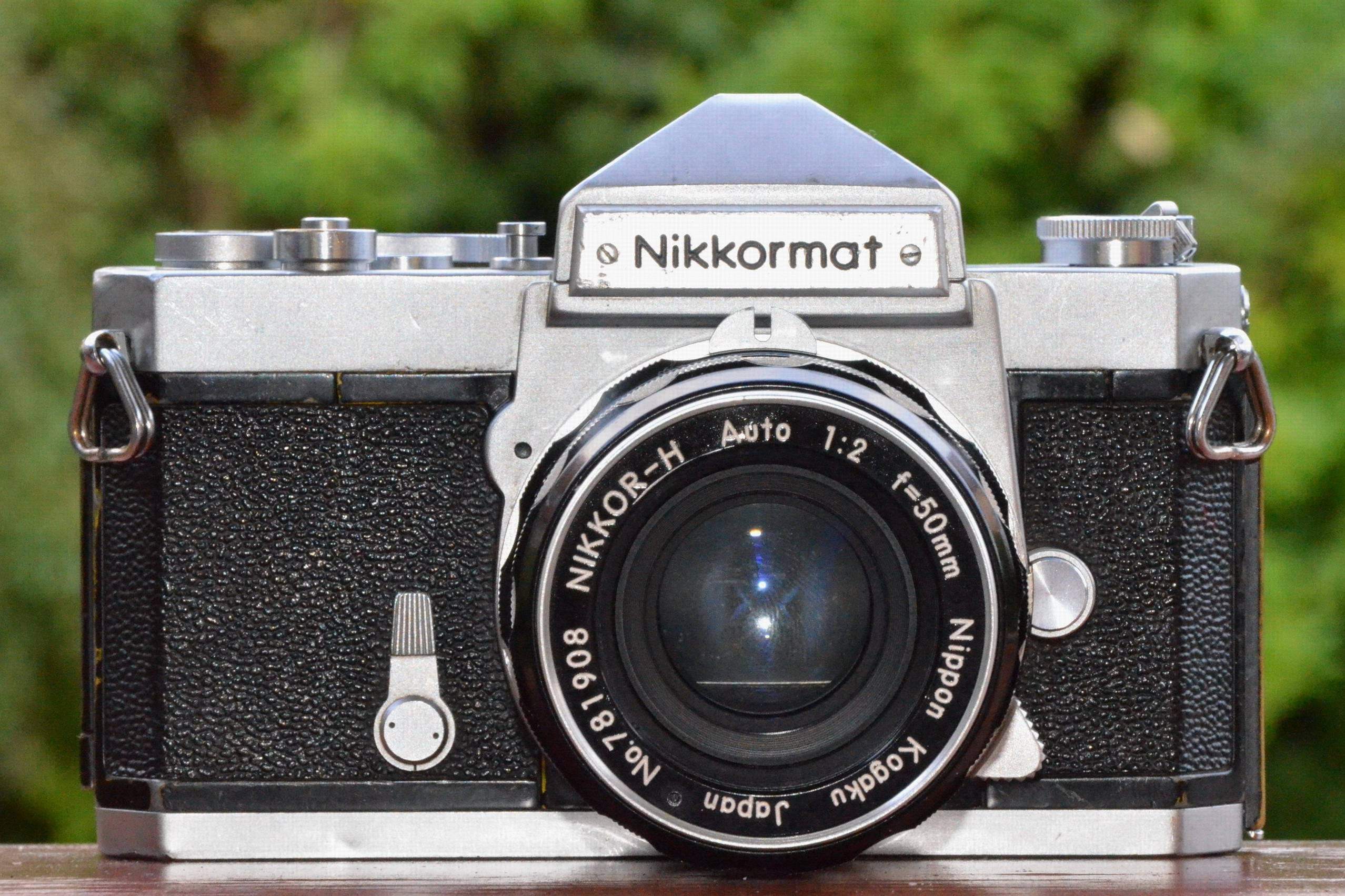
Rare Nikkormat FS with NIKKOR-H Auto 1:2 f=50mm lens

=== Nikkormat FS ===
The Nikkormat FS, manufactured from 1965 to 1971, was an FT stripped of the built-in light meter with its exposure information system and the mirror lockup feature. The FS was unpopular when new because of the lack of a built-in meter, but this makes it rarer and more valuable than the FTs to collectors today.

=== Nikkormat FTN ===
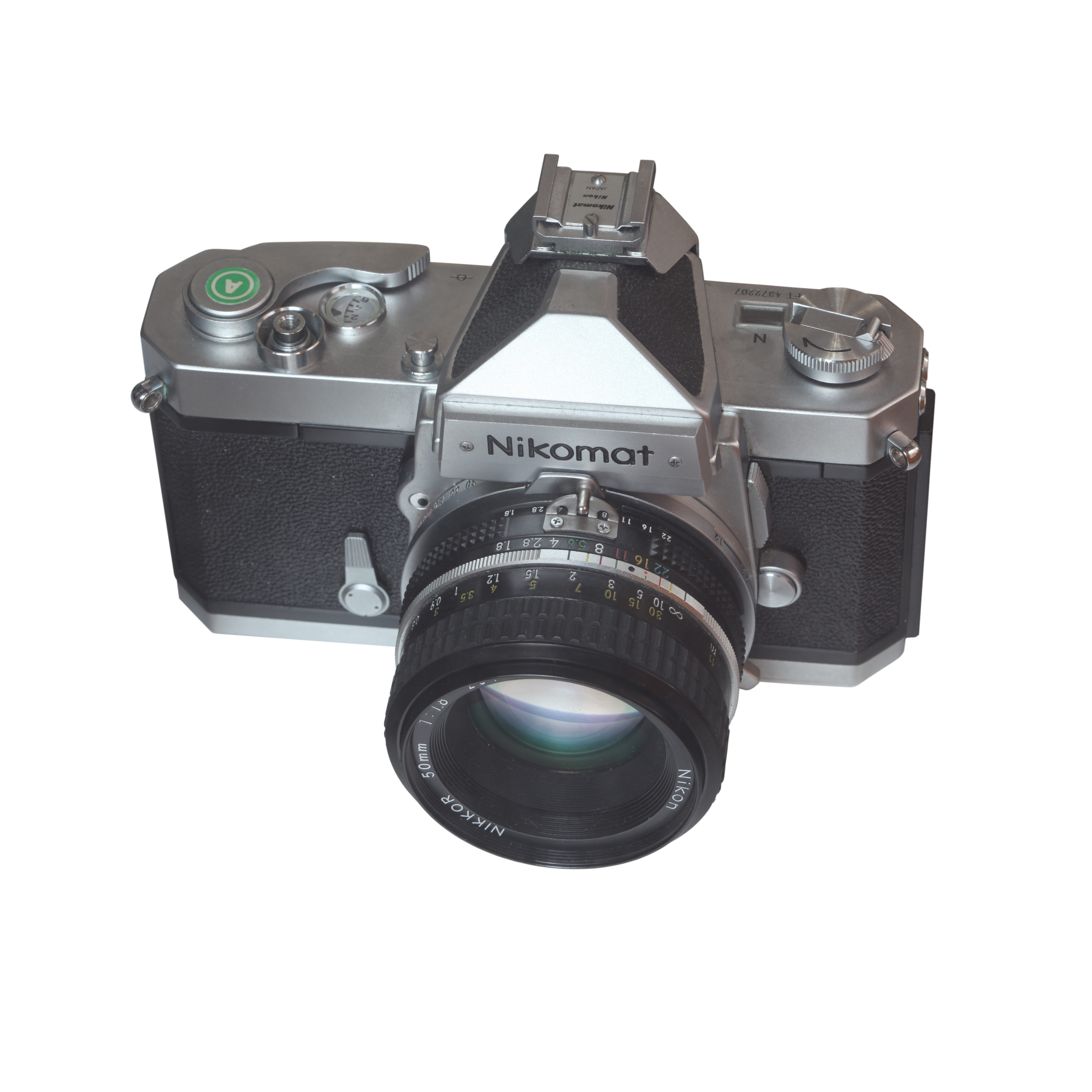
Nikomat FTN

The Nikkormat FTN was manufactured from 1967 to 1975. It simplified the lens mounting procedure of the rabbit ear Nikkor lenses. The meter coupling pin on the camera still had to be aligned with the meter coupling shoe on the lens, but the lens maximum aperture no longer had to be manually preset on the FTN.

Instead, the lens aperture ring had to be turned back and forth to the smallest aperture (largest f-stop number) and then to the largest (smallest number) immediately after mounting to ensure that the lens and the FTN couple properly (Nippon Kogaku called it indexing the maximum aperture of the lens) and meter correctly. This system seems unwieldy to today's photographers, but it was more efficient and easier than before, and became second nature to Nikon and Nikkormat photographers of the 1960s and 1970s.

In addition, the FTN improved the metering system to the now classic Nikon 60/40 percent centerweighted style. The viewfinder also added +/– over/underexposure metering markers and set shutter speed information.

The FTN also offered a choice (made at purchase time or by replacement at factory service centers) of brighter fixed viewfinder focusing screens: Nippon Kogaku's standard Type J with central 4 mm microprism focusing aid plus 12 mm etched circle indicating the area of the meter centerweighting or the Type A with central 3 mm split image rangefinder plus 12 mm etched circle.

The front and back of the Nikon Nikkormat FT2

=== Nikkormat FT2 ===
The Nikkormat FT2, manufactured from 1975 to 1977, added a permanently affixed hot shoe to the top of the pentaprism cover, combined the two PC terminals into one and switched the light meter battery to a non-toxic silver cell, one 1.5 V S76 or SR44. ASA adjustment also featured a lock and an easier slider than previous models. The advance lever was more contoured with an added plastic grip. The FT2's viewfinder also switched to Nippon Kogaku's new standard Type K focusing screen with 3 mm split image rangefinder and 1 mm microprism collar focusing aids plus 12 mm etched circle indicating the area of the meter centerweighting. A final small touch was the addition of "+" and "-" symbols on the display of the top meter read-out. The numerous little improvements on the FT2 directly reflected customer suggestions for the FTn.

=== Nikkormat FT3 ===
The Nikkormat FT3, manufactured for only several months in 1977 (but still available new from dealer stock in 1978), had the shortest production run of any Nippon Kogaku SLR. The FT3 was essentially identical to the FT2 except that it supported Nikkor lenses with the Automatic Indexing (AI) feature (introduced 1977). AI Nikkor lenses had an external "meter coupling ridge" cam on the lens aperture ring that pushed on an external "meter coupling lever" on a ring surrounding the FT3's lens mount flange to transfer lens set aperture information.

Note that most AF Nikkor autofocusing lenses are also AI types. They will mount and meter properly under manual focus on the FT3. However, Nikon's most recent SLR lenses, the AF Nikkor G and AF Nikkor DX types, are not AI types. They will mount, but will not function properly.

The FT3 was little more than a stopgap placeholder, awaiting the release of the first of the completely redesigned Nikon compact F-series SLRs, the all-new Nikon FM, with a more compact chassis, in late 1977.

The metering system was considered one of the best on the market at the time, as the Nikkormat FT3 remained a very popular camera with professionals and amateurs alike.

== The Nikkormat EL-series ==
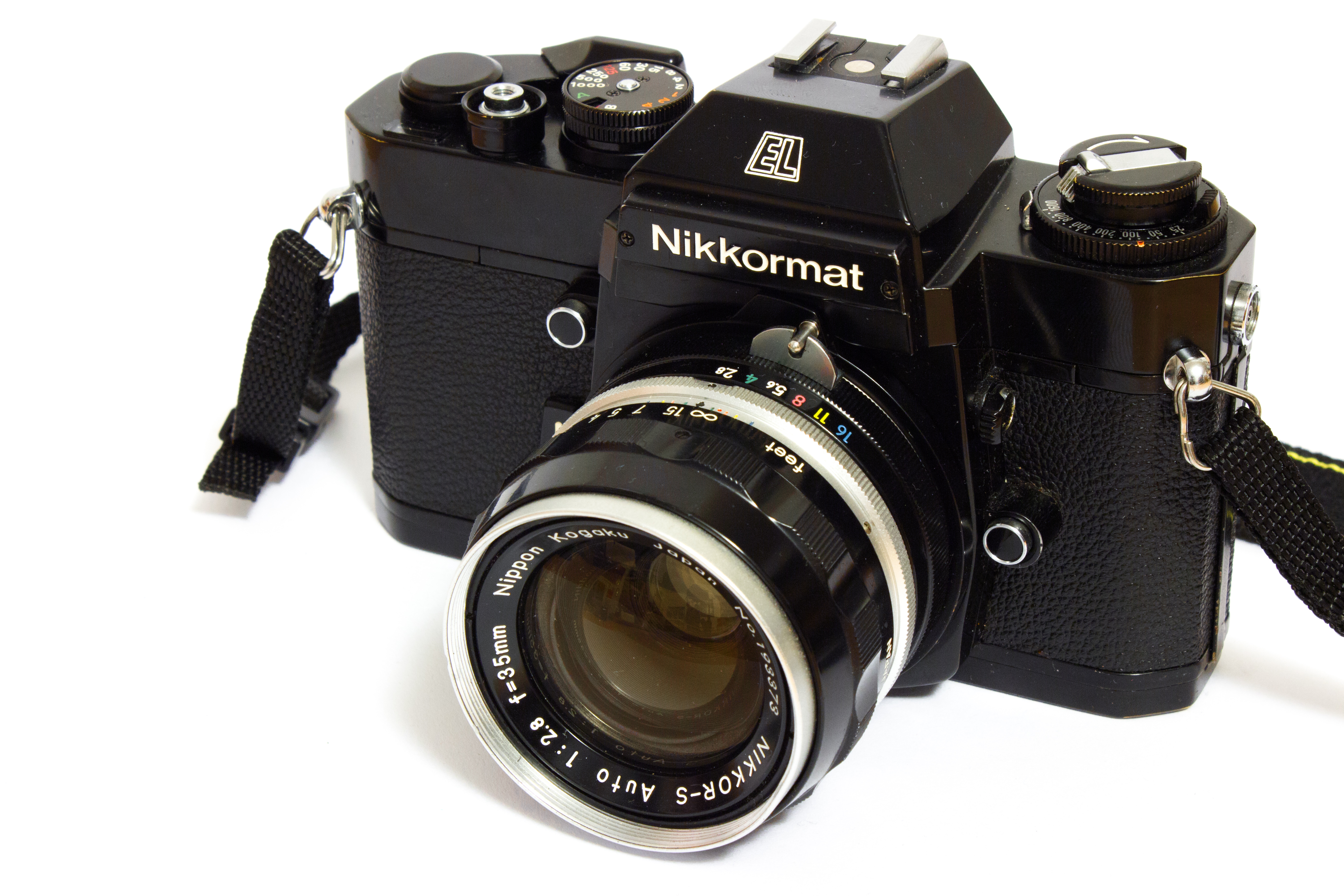
Nikkormat EL

=== Nikkormat EL ===
The Nikkormat EL was an all-metal, electromechanically (some solid-state electronics, but mostly springs, gears and levers) controlled, manual-focus SLR with manual exposure control or aperture-priority autoexposure, manufactured in Japan from 1972 to 1976. It was available in two colors: black with chrome trim and all black.

The EL had dimensions of 93.5 mm height, 145 mm width, 54.5 mm depth and 780 g weight. This was large and heavy compared to many other SLRs of the mid-1970s.

As Nippon Kogaku's first electronic autoexposure camera, the EL required a battery (one 6V PX28 or one 4SR44 in the bottom of the mirror box) to power its electronically controlled, metal-bladed, vertical-travel, focal-plane shutter with a speed range of four seconds to 1/1000 second (plus Bulb and flash X-sync at 1/125th second).

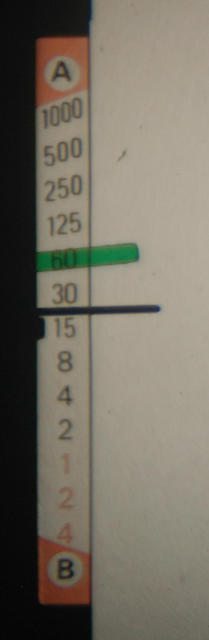
Nikkormat EL Match-needle Display

The battery also powered the camera's coupled 'match-needle' exposure metering system. This consisted of two needles pointing along a vertical shutter-speed scale visible in the viewfinder. In manual mode, a black needle pointed out the shutter speed recommended by the built-in 60/40 percent centerweighted, cadmium sulfide (CdS) light meter, while a translucent green needle showed the current (actual) shutter speed setting of the camera. The photographer would then adjust the shutter speed and/or the lens aperture until the needles aligned, at which point correct exposure would be achieved.

In automatic mode, the EL's black needle indicated the shutter speed automatically set by the camera in response to the light available and the lens aperture set by the user. The green needle just indicated that the EL was in "A" mode.

Setting a manual-exposure camera to expose the film properly takes two steps, even after taking a light meter reading. Autoexposure systems that greatly simplified the process were a boon when first introduced in the Konica AutoReflex (Autorex in Japan) in 1965. Nikon's autoexposure system was advanced at the EL's launch in 1972, and proved to be long-lived. Nippon Kogaku/Nikon continued to use aperture-priority autoexposure, with considerable development, in the Nikon FE, FE2 and FM3A of the succeeding Nikon compact F-series SLRs until 2006.

In common with other manufacturers' first-generation electronic autoexposure SLRs, the EL had a reputation for rapidly draining batteries; later models had much more energy-efficient electronics. Note that the EL would still function without batteries in a very limited fashion: fully mechanical operation, with only one shutter speed available (an unmarked, fixed 1/90 second) and without the light meter.

Like the contemporary Nikkormat FTN (see above), the EL accepted all 'rabbit-ear' Nikkor lenses (requiring a double-twist of the lens aperture ring on mounting), and its viewfinder had a choice of Type J or Type A fixed focusing-screens.

=== Nikkormat ELW ===
The Nikkormat ELW, manufactured from 1976 to 1977, was an EL modified to accept the Nikon AW-1 autowinder, providing motorized film advance at up to two frames per second. The ELW also expanded the automatic shutter speed range to eight seconds, and its viewfinder was fitted with a new standard focusing screen, the Type K (see the Nikkormat FT2 above).

=== Nikon EL2 ===
The Nikon EL2 was manufactured from 1977 to 1978 and was essentially identical to the ELW, but with the addition of instant response silicon photodiode light meter sensors and support for Nikkor lenses with the new Automatic Indexing (AI) feature (see the Nikkormat FT3 above).

The EL2 also abandoned the Nikkormat name (the Nikkormat FT3 being the last of the Nikkormat line) which had distinguished these cameras from the better known Nikon-badged models. The Nikon EL2 was replaced after a year of production by the Nikon FE.

== Design history ==
In 1959, Nippon Kogaku released its first 35mm SLR, which it intended to be the professional level of the Nikon F. The F combined SLR technological advances which were available in 1959, such as automatic diaphragm lenses, instant return mirror, and eye-level pentaprism viewfinder into an integrated package. It was designed for its mechanical durability and reliability, as well as for optical quality. The F later became a common 35 mm camera among professional photographers, especially among photojournalists and amateurs who could afford them.

However, the professional SLR market is a small market. The Nikon F with Nikkor 50 mm f/2 lens had a list price of US $359.50 (equivalent to $3,971 in 2025) in 1959 when new cars sold in the US$2500 range. Many amateur photographers could not afford Nikon cameras. Nippon Kogaku had tried offering a consumer grade camera-brand; beginning in 1963 the Nikkorex SLR was made by Mamiya but marketed by Nippon Kogaku and its distributors. Initially these cameras had fixed lenses and built-in metering, but in 1963 the Nikkorex F (made by Mamiya) was introduced; this was fully compatible with Nikkor F-mount lenses and had a look similar to the Nikon F style, though it was a larger camera. Despite reasonable quality in the later production, the Nikkorex brand was a marketing failure.

Nippon Kogaku's second attempt at a consumer camera-line was designed and manufactured completely in-house. The Nikkormat FS and FT of 1965 were similar in size and weight to the Nikon F, had a pentaprism viewfinders, and were fully compatible with the F-mount lenses. The more expensive Nikkormat FT offered through-the-lens exposure-metering. However these had fewer professional-level features compared to the Nikon F, these had a fixed viewfinders and did not accept motor drives. Nippon Kogaku achieved some success with amateurs, but by the mid-1970s the remaining Nikkormat models were rebadged as Nikons and the line ended.

== Current status ==
The Nikkormat EL-series were tough and reliable, but as with all first generation autoexposure SLRs, they are not considered as handy as later generations with better electronics. With the size and weight of older mechanical SLRs, but with fewer features than succeeding autoexposure SLRs, the ELs are not as popular today as the newer Nikon FE and FE2.

Nikkormats are still readily available on the second hand market. The FS, AI type and all-black bodies are relatively rare and carry a premium. Nikkormats are collected and pristine examples are difficult to come by.

| Class | 1950s | | | 1960s | | | | | | | | | | 1970s | | | | | | | | | | 1980s | | | | | | | | | | 1990s | | | | | | | | | | 2000s | | | | | | | | | | 2020s | | | |
| Class | 57 | 58 | 59 | 60 | 61 | 62 | 63 | 64 | 65 | 66 | 67 | 68 | 69 | 70 | 71 | 72 | 73 | 74 | 75 | 76 | 77 | 78 | 79 | 80 | 81 | 82 | 83 | 84 | 85 | 86 | 87 | 88 | 89 | 90 | 91 | 92 | 93 | 94 | 95 | 96 | 97 | 98 | 99 | 00 | 01 | 02 | 03 | 04 | 05 | 06 | 07 | 08 | 09 | ... | 20 | 21 | 22 |
| Profes- sional | | | F | | | | | | | | | | | | | | | | | | | | | F3 | | | | | | | | | | | | | | | | | | | | | | | | | | | | | | | | | |
| Profes- sional | | | | | | | | | | | | | | | F2 | | | | | | | | | | | | F3AF | | | | | F4 | | | | | | | | F5 | | | | | | | | F6 | | | | | | | | | |
| High- end | | | | | | | | | | | | | | | | | | | | | | | | | | | FA | | | | | F-801 (N8008)/ F-801s (N8008s) | | | | F90 (N90) | | F90X (N90s) | | | | | F100 | | | | | | | | | | | | | | |
| Mid- range | | | | | | | | | | | | | | | | | | | | | | | | | | | | | | F-501 (N2020) | | | | F-601 (N6006) | | | | F70 (N70) | | | | | | F80 (N80) | | | | | | | | | | | | | |
| Mid- range | | | | | | | | | | | | | | | | EL / EL2 /ELW | | | | | | FE | | | | | FE2 | | | | | | | F-601M (N6000) | | | | F70 (N70) | | | | | | F80 (N80) | | | | | | | | | | | | | |
| Mid- range | | | | | | | | | FT | | FTn/ FT2/ FT3 | | | | | | | | | | FM | | | | | FM2/FM2n | | | | | | | | | | | | | | | | | | | FM3A | | | | | | | | | | | | |
| Mid- range | | | | | | | | | FS | | | | | | | | | | | | FM | | | | | FM2/FM2n | | | | | | | | | | | | | | | | | | | FM3A | | | | | | | | | | | | |
| Entry- level | | | | | | | | | | | | | | | | | | | | | | | | | | | | | | | | | | | | | | | | | | | | | | | | | | | | | | | | | |
| Entry- level | | | | | | | | | | | | | | | | | | | | | | | | | | | | | | | | | | | | | | | | Pronea 600i/6i | | | | | | | | | | | | | | | | | |
| Entry- level | | | | | | | | | | | | | | | | | | | | | | | | | | | | | | | | | | | | | | | | | | Pronea S | | | | | | | | | | | | | | | |
| Entry- level | | | | | | Nikkorex F / Nikkor J | | | | | | | | | | | | | | | | | EM | | | FG | | | F-301 (N2000) | | | | F-401s (N4004s) | | | | | F50 (N50) | | | | | | | F65 (N65 / U) | | F75 (N75 / U2) | | | | | | | | | | |
| Entry- level | | | | 35 | | 35 II | | Auto 35 | | | | | | | | | | | | | | | | | | | | FG-20 | | | F-401 (N4004) | | | | F-401x (N5005) | | | | | | | | F60 (N60) | | | F55 (N55) | | | | | | | | | | | |
| Entry- level | | | | | | | Zoom 35 | | | | | | | | | | | | | | | | | | | | | | | | | | | | | | | | FM10 / FE10 | | | | | | | | | | | | | | | | | | |
| Class | 57 | 58 | 59 | 60 | 61 | 62 | 63 | 64 | 65 | 66 | 67 | 68 | 69 | 70 | 71 | 72 | 73 | 74 | 75 | 76 | 77 | 78 | 79 | 80 | 81 | 82 | 83 | 84 | 85 | 86 | 87 | 88 | 89 | 90 | 91 | 92 | 93 | 94 | 95 | 96 | 97 | 98 | 99 | 00 | 01 | 02 | 03 | 04 | 05 | 06 | 07 | 08 | 09 | ... | 20 | 21 | 22 |
| Class | 1950s | | | 1960s | | | | | | | | | | 1970s | | | | | | | | | | 1980s | | | | | | | | | | 1990s | | | | | | | | | | 2000s | | | | | | | | | | 2020s | | | |
